= Ġużè Damato =

Maltese architect (1886–1963)

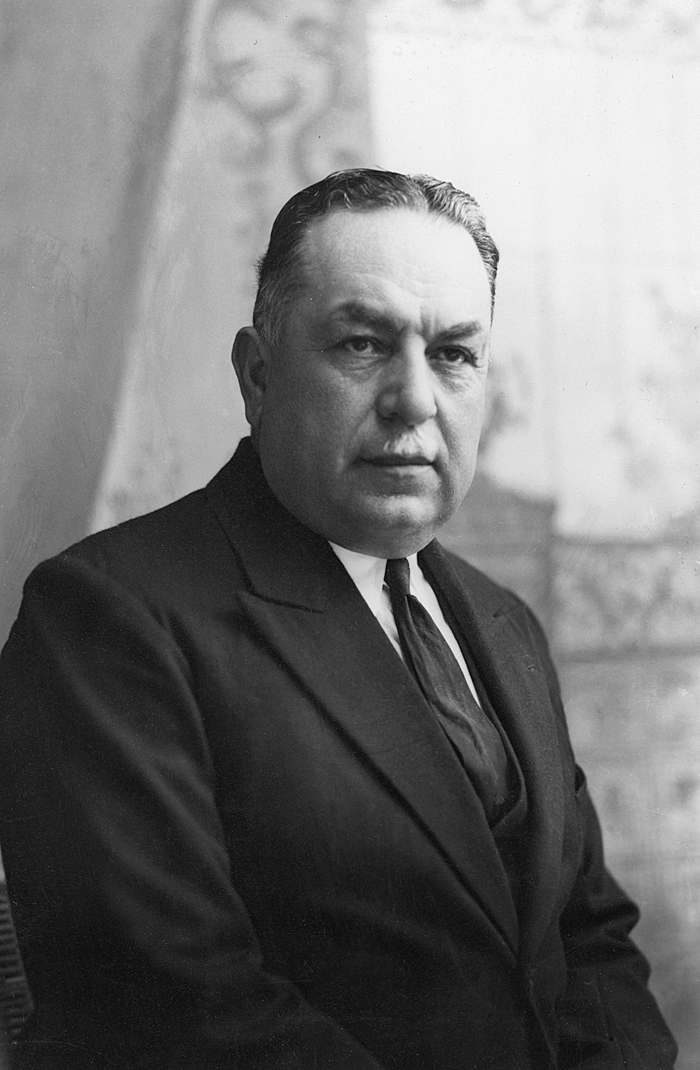
- Born: 13 December 1886; Sfax, French Tunisia
- Died: 25 May 1963 (aged 76)
- Occupation: Architect
- Notable work: Paola parish church Xewkija parish church Carmelite church, Valletta

Ġużè or Joseph Damato (13 December 1886 – 25 May 1963) was a Maltese architect who designed a number of churches and other ecclesiastical buildings during the 20th century. He was a pioneer of the use of reinforced concrete in Malta, and his most notable works include the Church of Christ the King in Paola, the Church of St John the Baptist in Xewkija and the Carmelite church in Valletta. Some of the buildings he designed were completed decades after his death.

== Biography ==
Damato was born on 13 December 1886 to Maltese emigrants in Sfax, French Tunisia. He studied at the De La Salle Brothers in Sfax, and at a young age, he was involved in boat-building, which was his family's business. He moved to Malta at the age of 19, and there he set up his own business.

Damato later studied naval architecture at Torre Annunziata in Italy. Despite not being formally qualified as an architect, he developed a passion for designing religious buildings. He did not charge money for designing churches, and other architects would have to sign his works since he lacked qualifications. Damato made use of reinforced concrete in his church designs after he had become familiar with the material during his studies in Italy.

In politics, Damato ran for the 1921 general election but was not elected. He later became the president of the Nationalist Party club in Paola.

D'Amato died on 25 May 1963 at the age of 76.

== Works ==
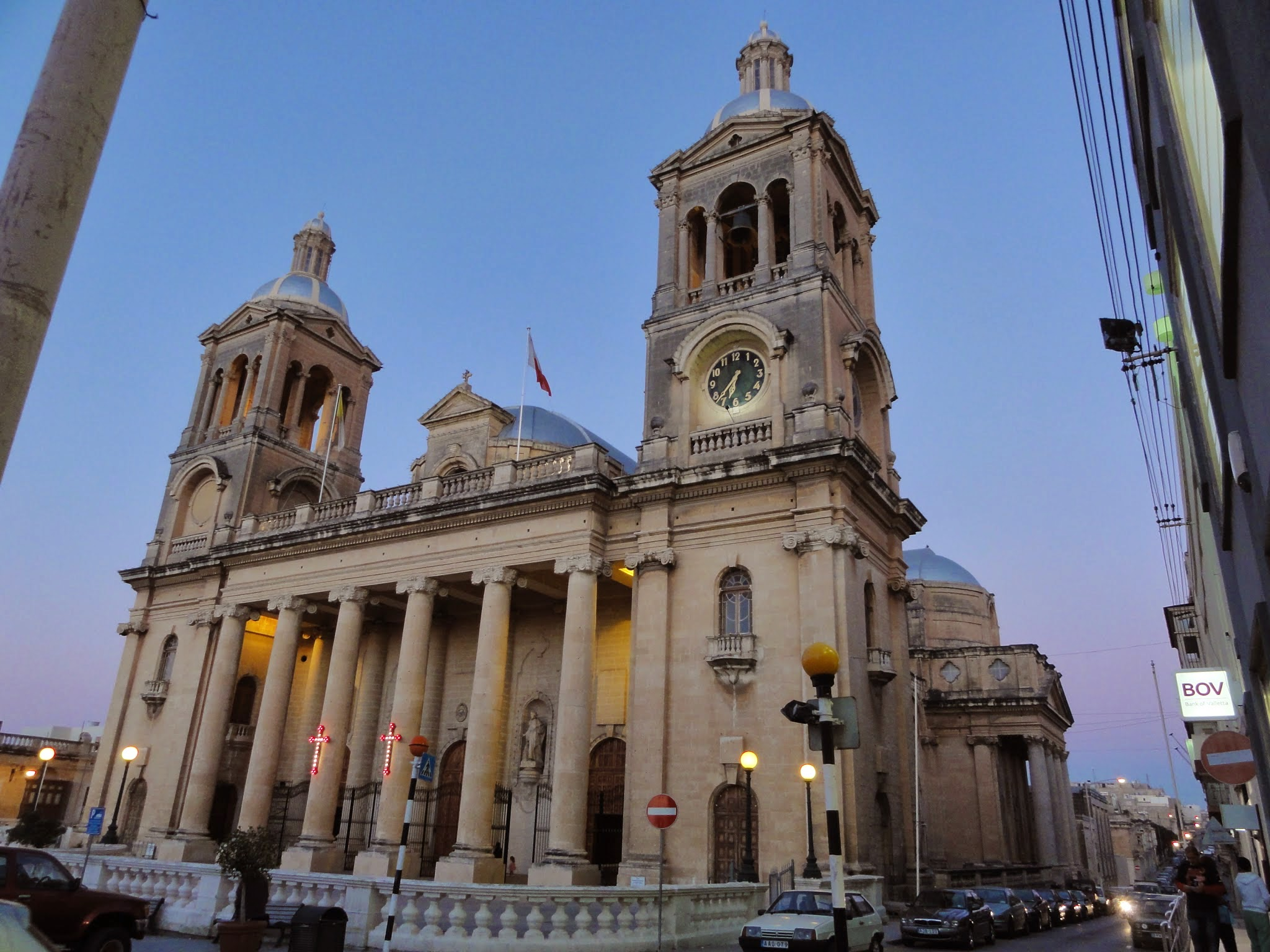
Church of Christ the King in Paola

Damato designed several buildings throughout his career, and he is best known for the Church of Christ the King in Paola, the Church of St John the Baptist in Xewkija and the Carmelite church in Valletta. The Paola church, which he designed in 1922, was his first major work, and it was an early example of the use of reinforced concrete in Malta. The Xewkija church, which was modelled on the church of Santa Maria della Salute in Venice, was constructed between 1952 and 1973, and it is regarded as his masterpiece. The Carmelite church was built between 1958 and 1981, and its iconic dome defines Valletta's skyline.

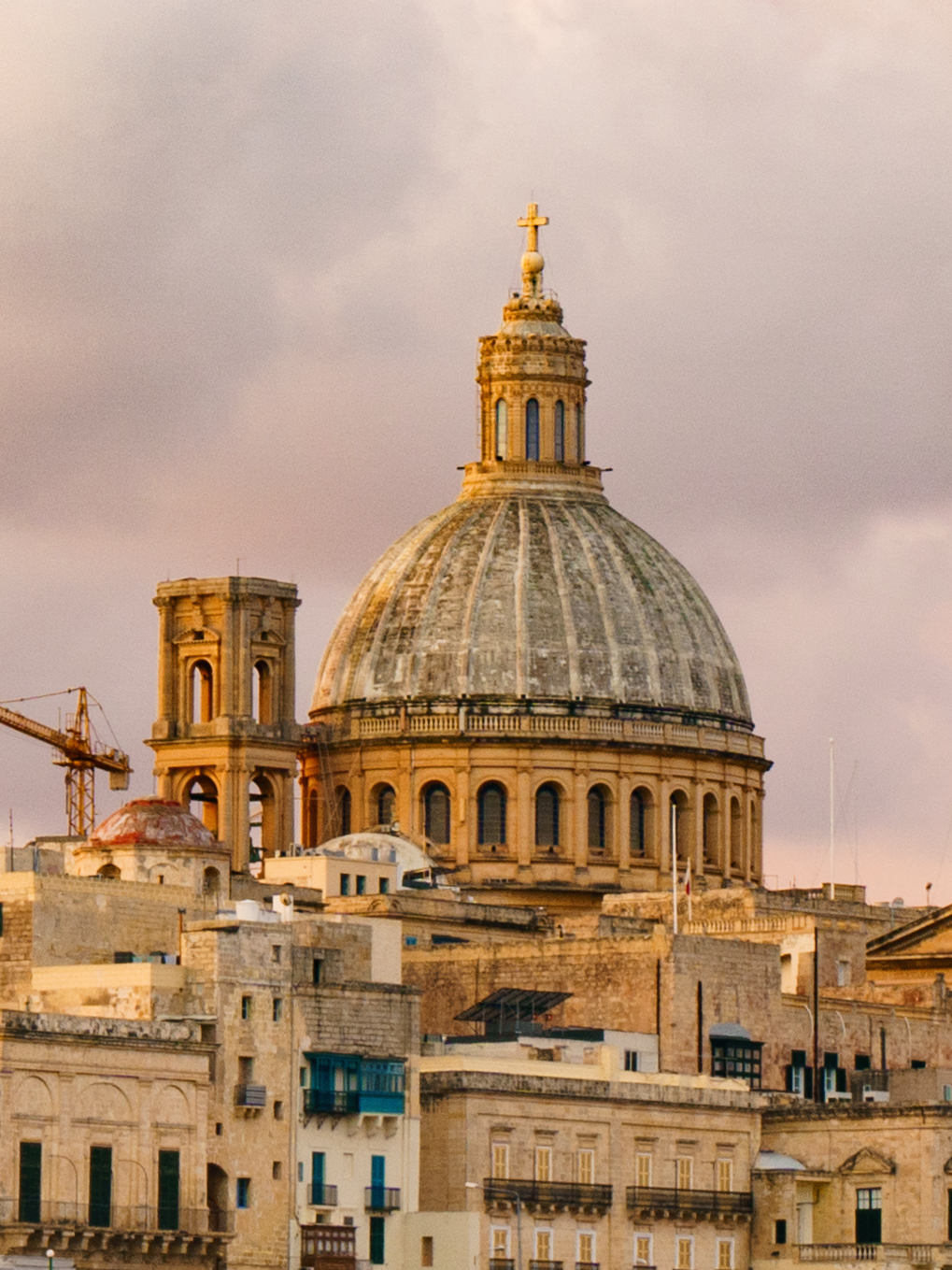
Dome of the Carmelite church in Valletta

Other churches designed by Damato include the churches of St Francis of Assisi and the Immaculate Conception in Ħamrun, the Carmelite church in Fleur-de-Lys, the St Anthony church in Għajn Dwieli and the now-demolished Capuchin church in Xemxija. He also enlarged several churches, including the Jesus of Nazareth church in Sliema and the parish church of Dingli. He oversaw the construction of the dome of the Parish Church of St Cajetan in Ħamrun to designs of Andrea Vassallo, and he was also involved in minor alterations to several other churches and convents.

Damato also designed the St Catherine hospital in Attard, the St Joseph Institute in Għajnsielem, a retreat house at Baħar iċ-Ċagħaq and schools and colleges in Cottonera, Birkirkara, Tarxien and Qormi. He also designed the M.U.S.E.U.M. headquarters at Blata l-Bajda and M.U.S.E.U.M. houses at Tarxien, Mqabba and Qormi. He also designed a townhouse in Victoria, Gozo in the 1950s.
