= Andrea Vassallo (architect) =

Maltese architect (1856–1928)

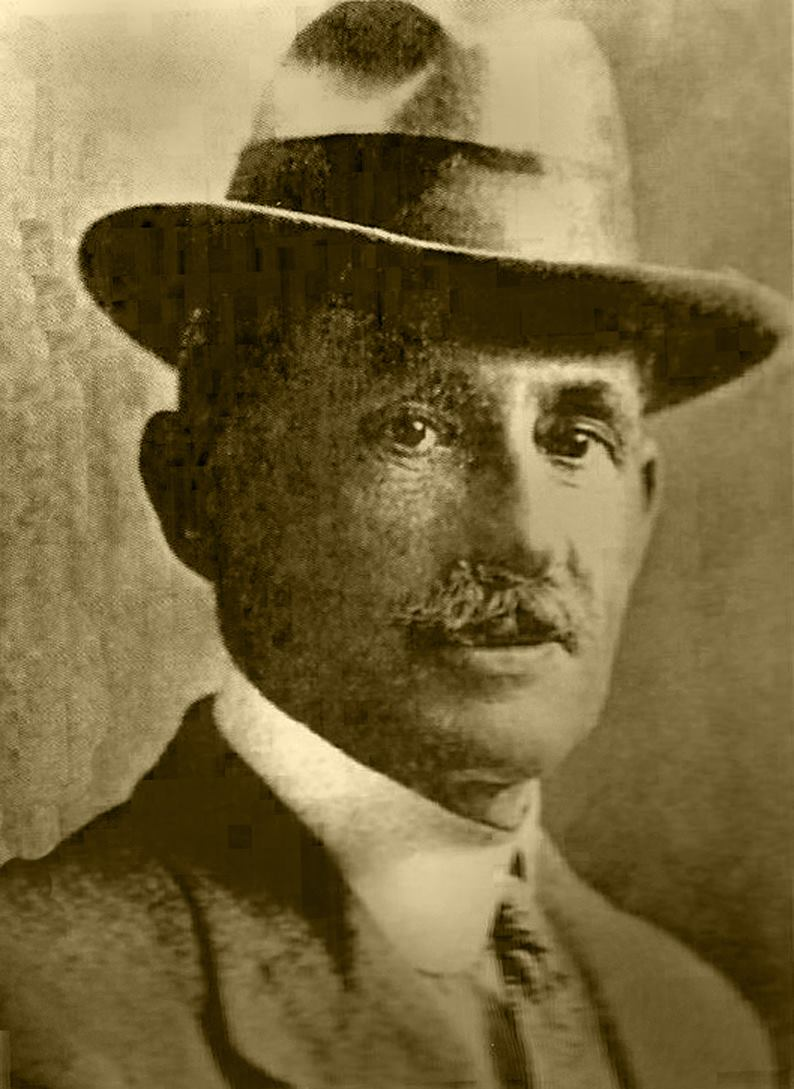
- 1919 passport photo
- Born: 2 January 1856; Luqa, Malta
- Died: 28 January 1928 (aged 72); Zammit Clapp Hospital, St. Julian's, Malta
- Occupation: Architect
- Notable work: Ta' Pinu basilica Ħamrun parish church dome Siġġiewi parish church dome Villa Rosa; Casa Said
- Children: Edwin Vassallo

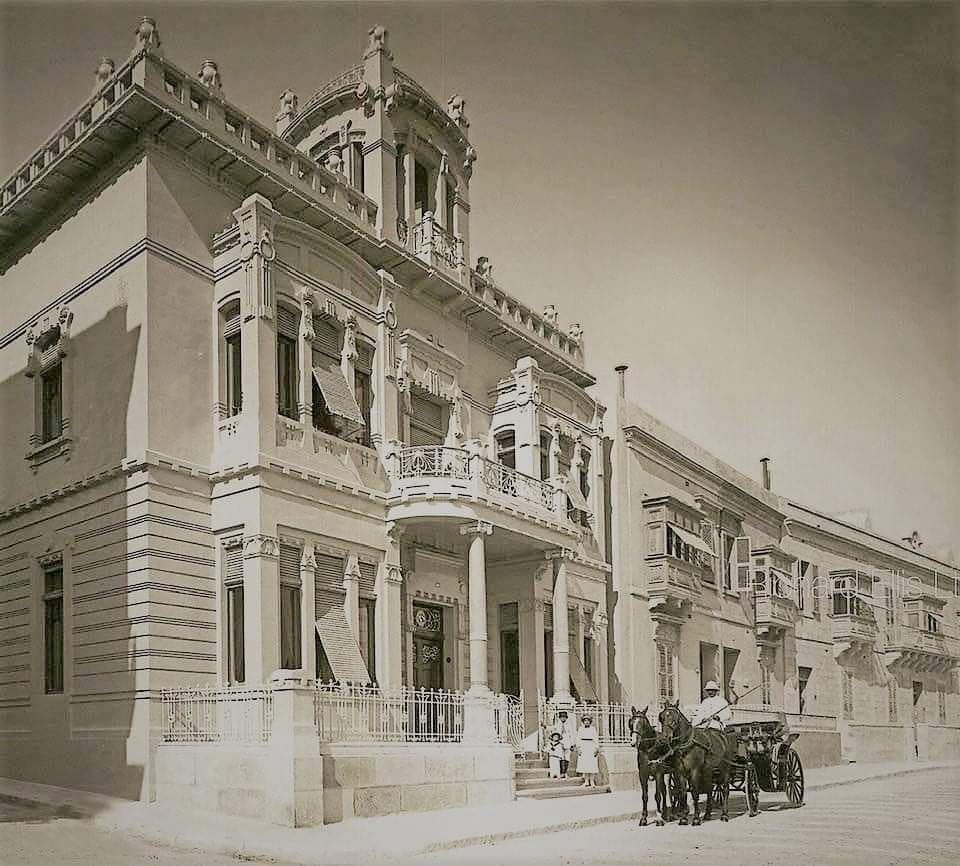
Casa Said, Sliema; picture by Richard Ellis

Andrea Vassallo (2 January 1856 – 28 January 1928) was a Maltese architect. He designed buildings in various styles, including Neoclassicism, Rococo Revival, Neo-Gothic, Art Nouveau and Neo-Romanesque. His masterpiece is the basilica of Ta' Pinu in Gozo, while other notable works include the domes of the Ħamrun and Siġġiewi parish churches, Villa Rosa and the now-demolished Casa Said.

== Biography ==
Vassallo was born in the town of Luqa on 2 January 1856. He initially worked as a stone sculptor, but by 1887 he had been involved in many aspects of the construction industry, including designing, building or remodeling various buildings and structures to a variety of patrons. He entered government service on 21 December 1887, taking over the late Webster Paulson's post of Clerk of Works. In 1892, he was admitted into the Institution of British Civil Engineers on the recommendation of Sir Lintorn Simmons and Sir Osbert Chadwick. He became a Fellow of the Royal Institute of British Architects in 1907, and was finally granted the Warrant of Land Surveyor and Architect on 7 November 1908. This was condemned by the Istituto dei Periti since Vassallo had never formally studied architecture.

Vassallo was awarded the Order of St. Gregory the Great by Pope Pius X for his services during the Eucharistic Congress of 1913, for which he had designed a tribune.

== Works ==
Vassallo designed or was involved in the construction of many buildings and structures, including hospitals, schools, workshops and houses, and he used various architectural styles throughout his career. One of his notable works was a wrought iron conservatory at the Argotti Botanic Gardens, which was built sometime before 1907. This was a unique structure in Malta, but it was later demolished due to high maintenance costs. Vassallo also designed the Neoclassical Sliema Government Elementary School, which was built in around 1908–10.

Residential buildings designed by Vassallo include a Neo-Gothic house located near the Mdina Cathedral. Its design was well received by the public, but it was also criticized since its style does not blend well with its surroundings. He also designed two Art Nouveau houses which were built in the 1920s: Villa Rosa in St. Julian's and the now-demolished Casa Said in Sliema.

In the 1920s, Vassallo won a competition for the design of the dome of the Parish Church of St. Cajetan in Ħamrun, which would eventually be built in 1953–55 under the direction of Ġużè Damato. Despite being constructed decades after his death, the dome was built to his original designs with structural alterations made by Damato. This is regarded as being one of the finest domes in Malta. Vassallo also designed the dome of the Church of St. Nicholas in Siġġiewi (1919), the Rococo Revival Sanctuary of Our Lady of Tal-Ħerba in Birkirkara (1923), and the Neo-Romanesque basilica of Ta' Pinu in Gozo. The latter is regarded as Vassallo's masterpiece due to its monumentality and intricate design, although it is sometimes criticized as being alien in its surroundings.

He designed numerous prominent Victorian townhouses at Saqqajja in Rabat, Malta.

Vassallo died on 28 January 1928 at the Zammit Clapp Hospital, which he had designed himself in 1910. Vassallo's legacy is sometimes overlooked since many of his buildings are often wrongly attributed to other architects.

His son, Edwin Vassallo, was also an architect, and Minister for Public Works (1927–1930).

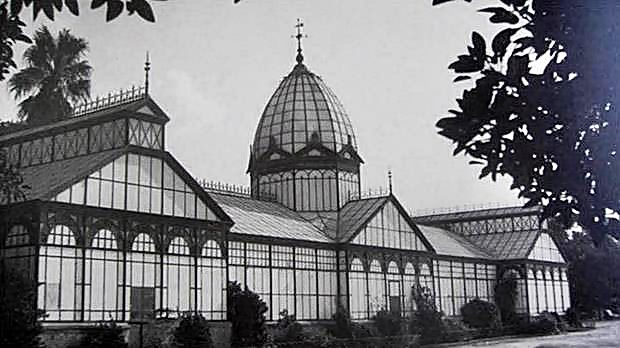
Argotti Botanic Gardens greenhouse (1903, demolished 1931)

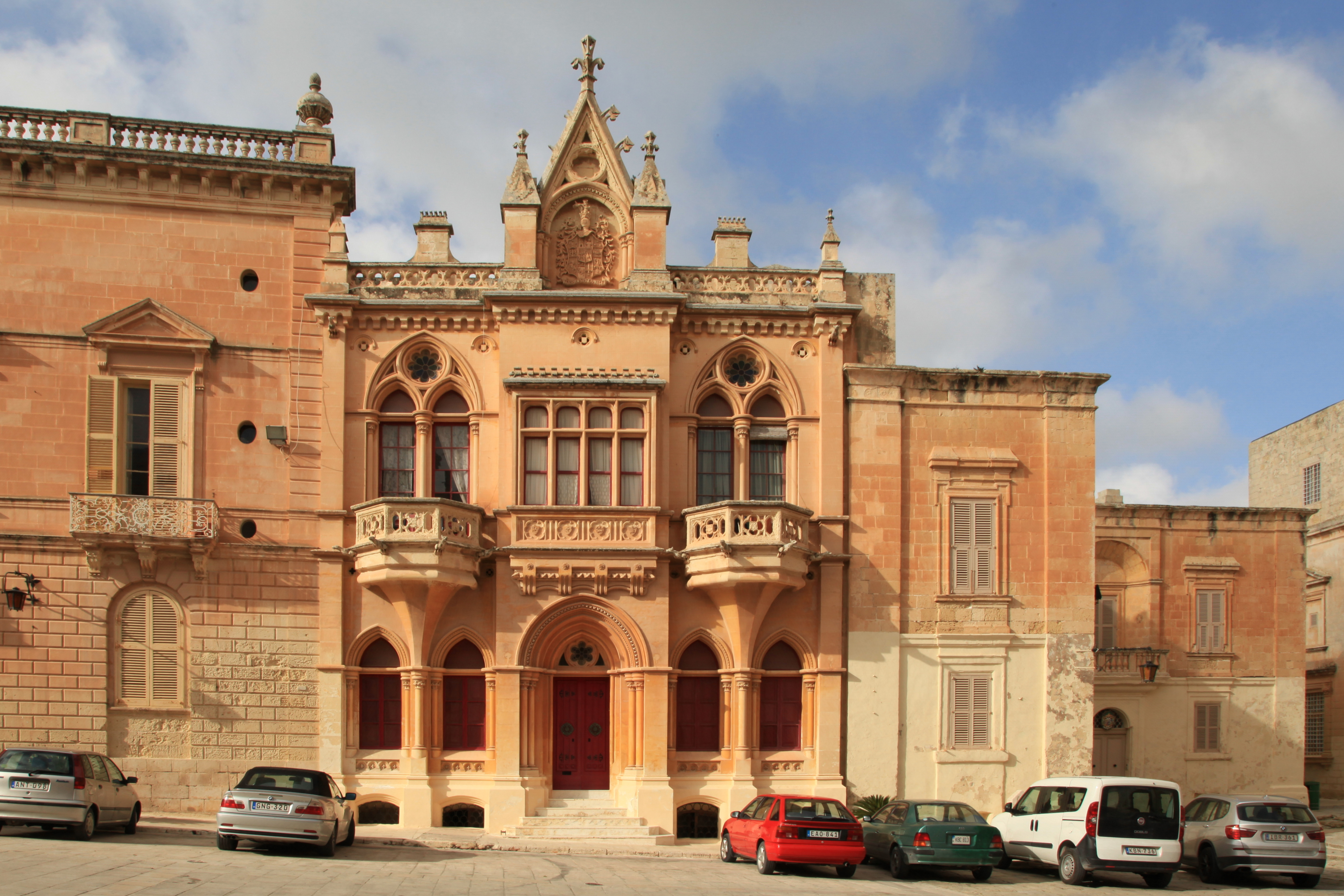
Neo-Gothic house near the Mdina cathedral

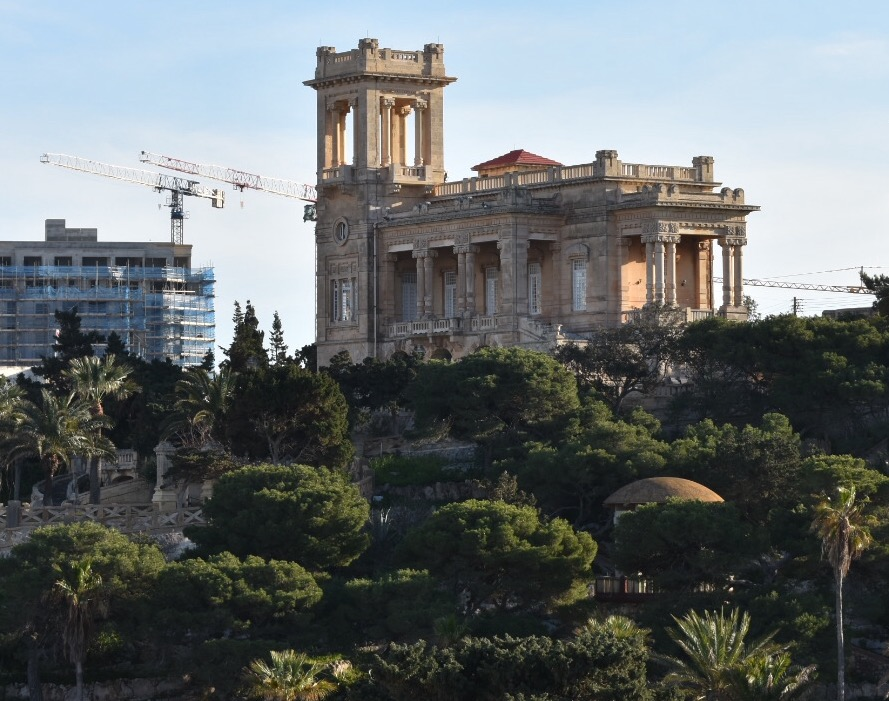
Villa Rosa

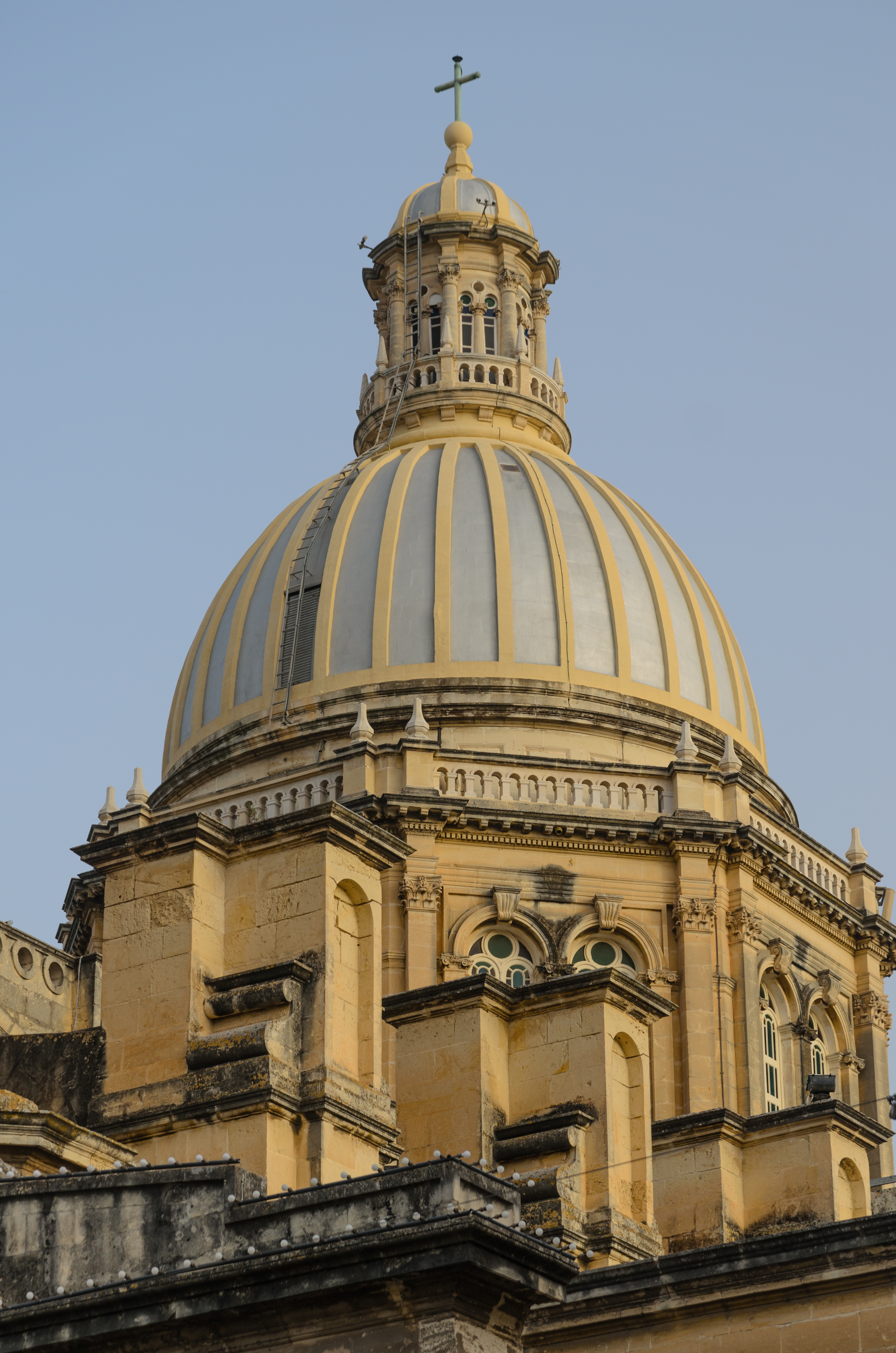
Dome of the Parish Church of St Cajetan, Ħamrun

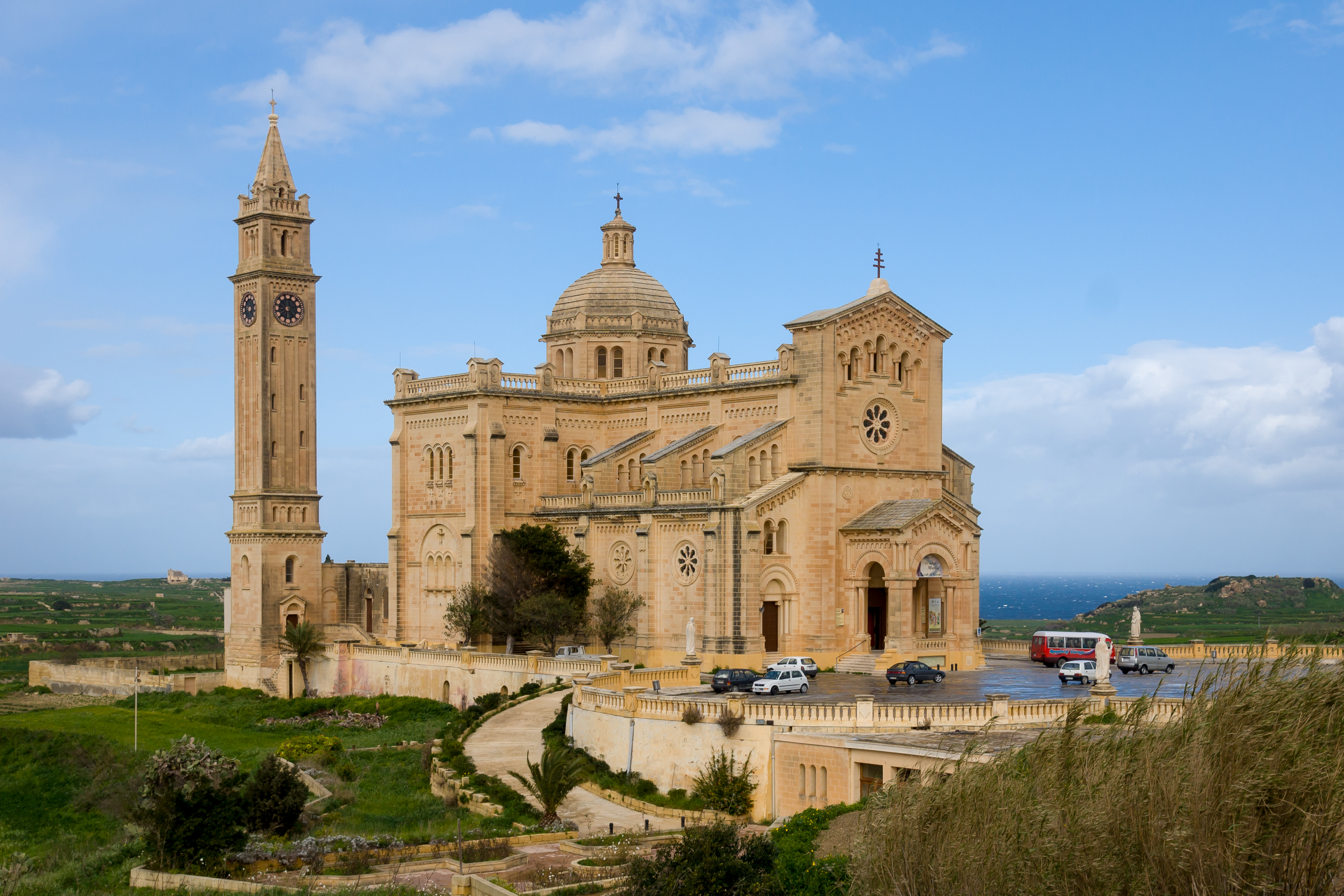
Ta' Pinu basilica
