= Schinas =

Schinas is a surname of Greek origin. Notable people with the surname include:

- Alexandros Schinas (c. 1870–1913), Greek assassin who murdered King George I of Greece
- Giorgio Costantino Schinas (1834–1894), Maltese architect and civil engineer
- Margaritis Schinas (born 1962), Greek politician
