= Church of St Francis of Assisi, Ħamrun =

Church of St Francis of Assisi
- Knisja ta' San Franġisk t'Assisi
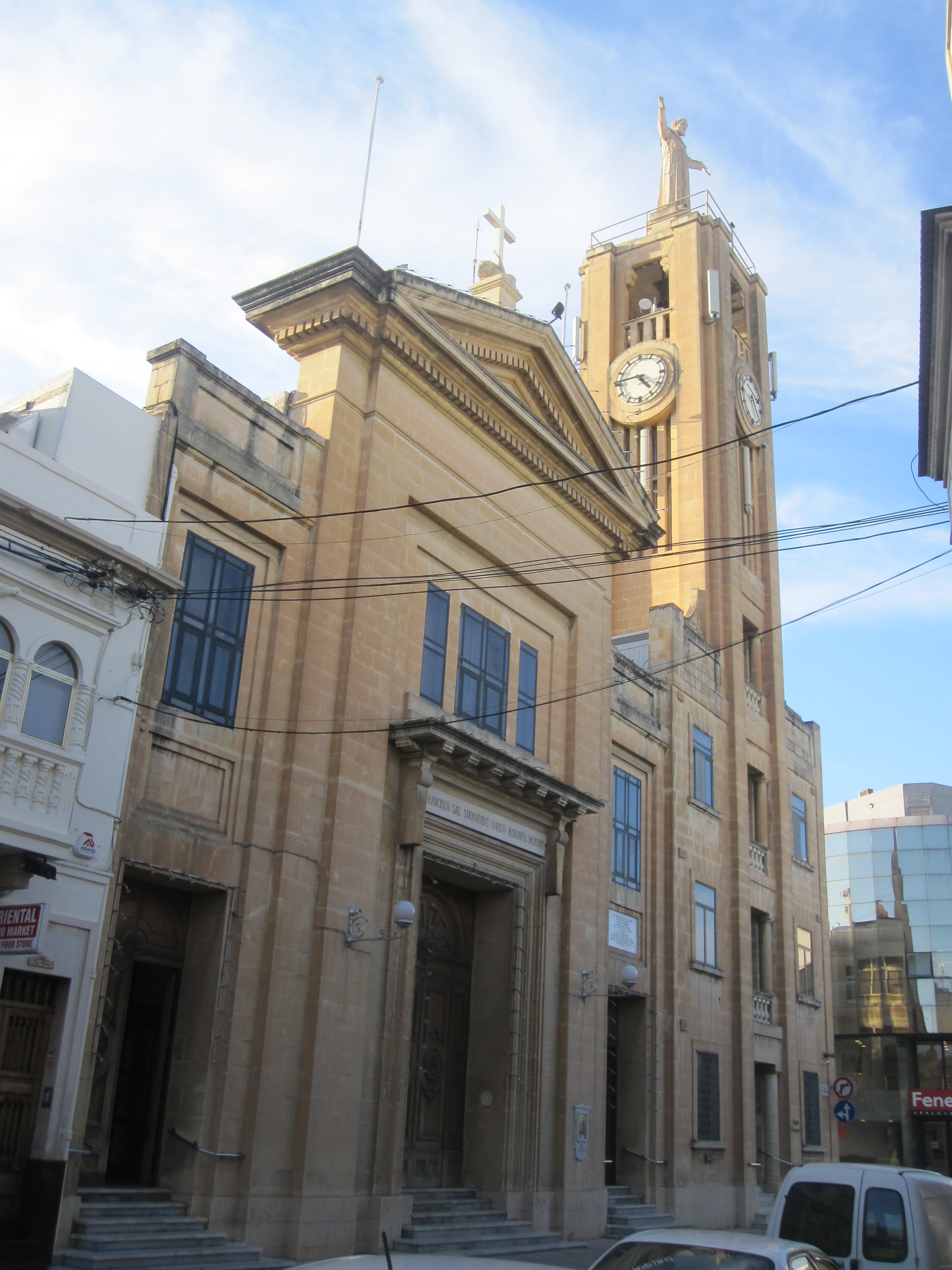
- The church's façade in 2017
- Church of St Francis of Assisi
- 35°53′29.6″N 14°29′8.3″E
- Location: Ħamrun, Malta
- Denomination: Roman Catholic
- Religious order: Order of Friars Minor

History
- Status: Church
- Dedication: Francis of Assisi
- Consecrated: 29 May 1955

Architecture
- Functional status: Active
- Architect: Ġużè Damato
- Years built: 1952–1954

Specifications
- Capacity: 2000
- Length: 43 m (141 ft)
- Width: 21 m (69 ft)
- Materials: Limestone and concrete

Administration
- Archdiocese: Malta
- Parish: Ħamrun (Immaculate Conception)

The Church of St Francis of Assisi (Maltese: Knisja ta' San Franġisk t'Assisi) is a Roman Catholic church in Ħamrun, Malta. It was built between 1952 and 1954.

== History ==
The Order of Friars Minor established a small chapel in Ħamrun on 16 August 1947, and it was located in a converted garage. This chapel was meant to be temporary, and the Order began to search for a plot of land on which to build a permanent church soon afterwards. After the site was chosen, construction of the church began with the first stone being laid down on 13 April 1952 by Tarcisju Xerri, the Order's superior. The church was built to designs of the architect Ġużè Damato. The building was opened to the public on 30 October 1954 and it was consecrated by Archbishop Mikiel Gonzi in May 1955.

The church falls under the jurisdiction of the parish of the Immaculate Conception of Ħamrun.

== Architecture ==
The church has a simple Roman style, and it is built out of local limestone and concrete. The latter is used for the roof and octagonal dome, while stone is used for the church's walls. The building can accommodate 2000 people, and it is 43 metres (141 ft) and 21 metres (69 ft) wide including the side aisles. The nave itself has a width of 17 metres (56 ft). The church has a large bell tower which is topped by a statue of St Francis sculpted by Marco Montebello and installed on 21 February 1960.

Internally, the church contains a main altar and two secondary altars, along with a chapel dedicated to Our Lady of Perpetual Help. A Franciscan convent is located adjacent to the church and the two buildings are connected internally.

== Artworks ==
The church has a titular statue of St Francis accepting his stigmata which was sculpted in marble by Wistin Camilleri, and it also contains marble statues of Anthony of Padua and the Immaculate Conception which were produced by the Andriani company of Lucca.
