= Giorgio Costantino Schinas =

Maltese architect and civil engineer (1834–1894)

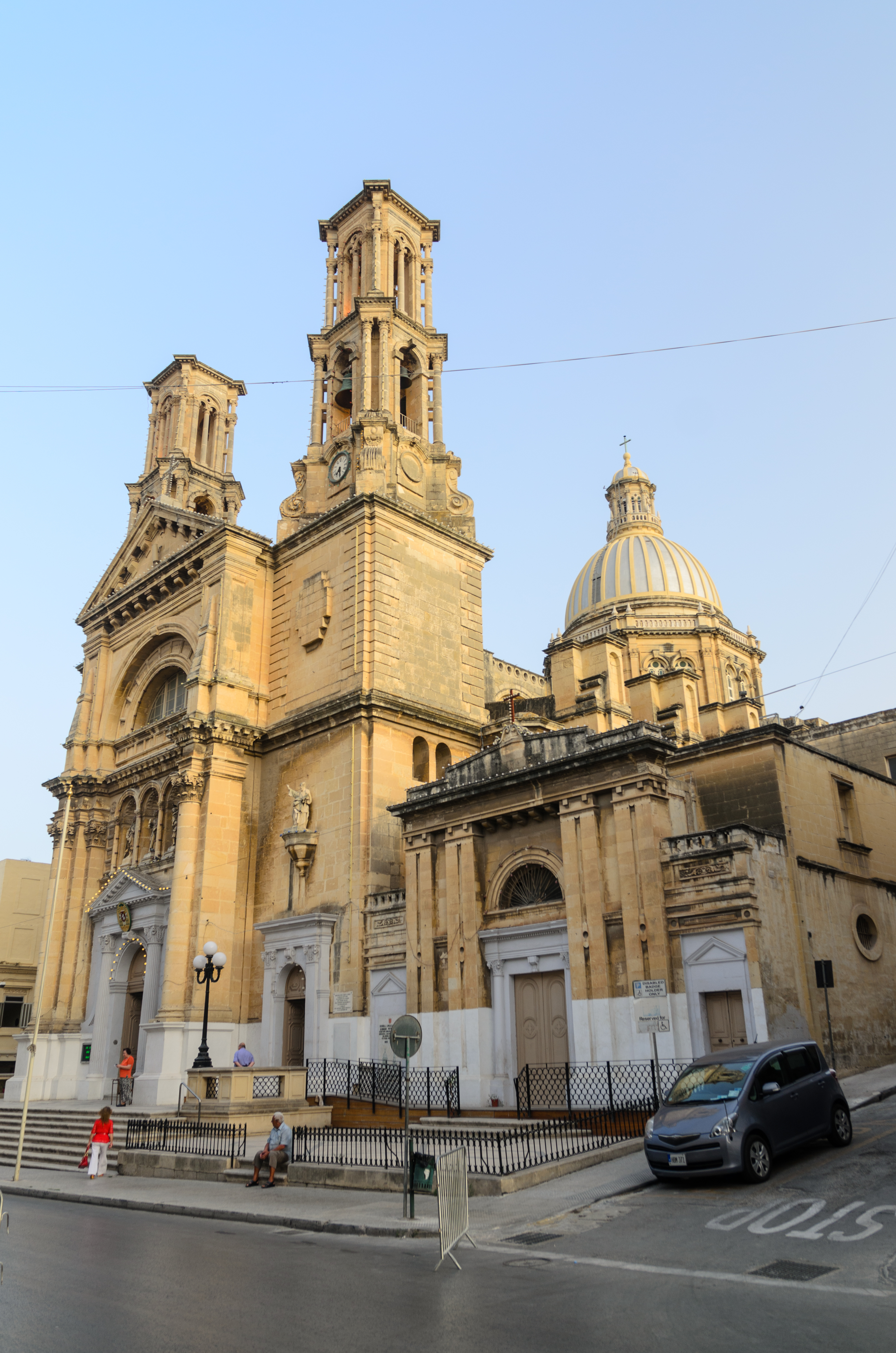
The Parish Church of St Cajetan, Ħamrun, designed by Schinas

Giorgio Costantino Schinas (1834 – 27 June 1894) was a Maltese architect and civil engineer. He was of Greek descent.

== Biography ==
Schinas was born in Valletta in 1834, to Costantino Schinas and his wife Elisabetta Camilleri. He studied at the Royal University of Pavia, the Reale Scuola d'Applicazione degli Ingegneri of Turin, and the University of Malta, graduating as a civil engineer in 1863. He worked in the civil service, and he was the Superintendent for Public Works from 1888 until his death. He was granted the warrant of architect and land surveyor.

Schinas' most notable works are the Parish Church of St. Cajetan (1869–75) in Hamrun and a water pumping station at Luqa. In the former, he used a combination of a number of architectural styles, including Gothic Revival and Baroque. He also planned a Romanesque Revival turret-like structure instead of a dome, but this was not built.

Schinas was also a professor of Mathematics and Physics at the University of Malta and an ex officio member of the Council of Government. He married Marianna Cassar Torreggani. Schinas died on 27 June 1894.
