= Parish Church of Our Lady of Mount Carmel, Fleur-de-Lys =

Parish Church of Our Lady of Mount Carmel
- Knisja Parrokjali tal-Madonna tal-Karmnu
- Parish Church of Our Lady of Mount Carmel
- 35°53′31.1″N 14°28′18.3″E
- Location: Fleur-de-Lys, Birkirkara, Malta
- Denomination: Roman Catholic
- Religious order: Carmelites
- Website: www.fleurdelysparish.com

History
- Status: Parish church
- Dedication: Our Lady of Mount Carmel

Architecture
- Functional status: Active
- Architect: Ġużè Damato
- Years built: 1945–1946

Specifications
- Materials: Limestone

Administration
- Archdiocese: Malta
- Parish: Fleur-de-Lys (since 1975); Santa Venera (before 1975)

The Parish Church of Our Lady of Mount Carmel (Maltese: Knisja Parrokjali tal-Madonna tal-Karmnu) is a Roman Catholic parish church in Fleur-de-Lys, a suburb of Birkirkara, Malta. It was built by the Carmelites between 1945 and 1946 and it became a parish church in 1975.

== History ==
During and after World War II, Fleur-de-Lys was one of several settlements in Malta which grew significantly as refugees from the bombed-out Cottonera moved to the area. At the time, it formed part of the Santa Venera parish which was run by the Carmelites, and there were concerns because few of the area's residents were attending Mass at Santa Venera.

Parish priest Alfons Zammit began to search for a plot of land in Fleur-de-Lys on which to build a church for that area, and a construction site in which works had halted due to the war was chosen. The new church was designed by the architect Ġużè Damato and it was constructed by Ġużè and Antonio Falzon. The first stone was laid down by Peter Dimech, the Prior Provincial, on 14 January 1945, and construction progressed rapidly. The building was blessed on 31 December 1946 and it was officially opened on 1 January 1947; the main altar was consecrated by Archbishop Mikiel Gonzi on 14 May 1948.

On 18 January 1975, Archbishop Gonzi signed a decree establishing Fleur-de-Lys as a separate parish. This took effect on 25 January 1975, and the building therefore became a parish church.

== Artworks ==
The church's altarpiece is a painting by Anthony Caruana which depicts the Virgin Mary giving a scapular to St Simon Stock. The church also contains paintings of the saints Alphonsus Liguori and Albert of Jerusalem. The titular statue which depicts Our Lady of Mount Carmel was purchased in 1948 from Rome, and the church also contains statues of Saint Joseph and Our Lady of Sorrows.
