= Parish Church of the Immaculate Conception, Ħamrun =

Parish Church of the Immaculate Conception of Our Lady
- Knisja Parrokjali tal-Immakulata Kunċizzjoni
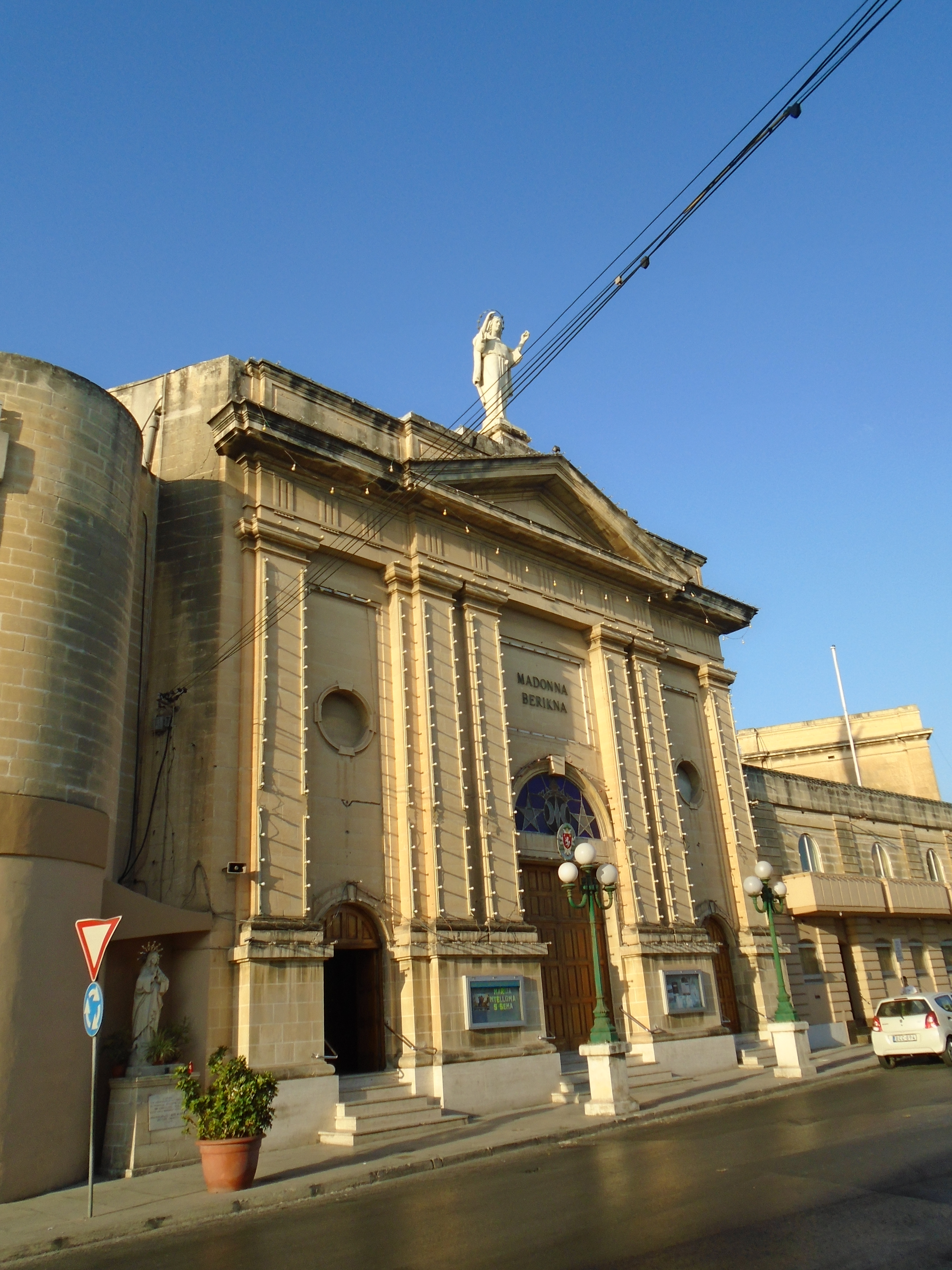
- The church's façade in 2016
- Parish Church of the Immaculate Conception of Our Lady
- 35°53′18.6″N 14°29′19″E
- Location: Ħamrun, Malta
- Denomination: Roman Catholic

History
- Status: Parish church
- Dedication: Immaculate Conception
- Consecrated: 28 May 1988

Architecture
- Functional status: Active
- Architect: Ġużè Damato
- Years built: 1958–1963

Specifications
- Length: c. 40 m (130 ft)
- Width: c. 15 m (49 ft)
- Materials: Limestone and concrete

Administration
- Archdiocese: Malta
- Parish: Ħamrun (Immaculate Conception) (since 1968); Ħamrun (St Cajetan) (1963–1967)

The Parish Church of the Immaculate Conception of Our Lady (Maltese: Knisja Parrokjali tal-Immakulata Kunċizzjoni) is a Roman Catholic parish church in Ħamrun, Malta. It was built between 1958 and 1963 and it took over the role of an oratory dedicated to the Immaculate Conception which had been established in Ħamrun in 1923. It has been a parish church since 1968.

== History ==
An oratory dedicated to the Immaculate Conception was established in Ħamrun by Paul Burlo on 15 May 1923. Initially set up within a private dwelling, its location was moved several times over the next two decades. After Burlo died in 1950, the priest Edgar Vella took over the oratory and made plans to construct a permanent church. With assistance from Archbishop Mikiel Gonzi and pastor Matthew Chircop from the St Cajetan parish, Vella acquired a plot of land which formerly contained railway tracks of the Malta Railway to build the new building.

The new church was designed by the architect Ġużè Damato and it was built by the stonemason Geraldu Camilleri. The first stone was laid down by Bishop Emanuel Galea on 23 March 1958, and by the end of the year the basement was completed and it was being used to celebrate Mass. The building was almost complete by the time of Vella's death in 1962, but works halted soon afterwards due to a number of unpaid debts. The priest Joseph Mifsud Bonnici was later appointed to resume construction, and the building's finishing touches were made with the assistance of local volunteers. The church was inaugurated by Bishop Galea on 14 August 1963.

The area in which the church was built had developed rapidly in the years following World War II. The building became a vice-parish church in 1966, and later a parish church on 1 January 1968. A parish centre and a house for the pastor were built adjacent to the church in the 1970s, and work on the church's interior was fully completed in the 1980s. It was officially consecrated by Archbishop Joseph Mercieca on 28 May 1988.

== Architecture ==
Externally, the church is built in a classical style and it includes a small concrete dome and a single bell tower. It is about 40 metres (130 ft) long and 15 metres (49 ft) wide, and it includes a single altar set in front of a sanctuary which consists of three large niches. Two sacristies are located at the rear of the building.

== Artworks ==
The church's sanctuary contains a mosaic of the Immaculate Conception which is based on Bartolomé Esteban Murillo's 17th-century painting The Immaculate Conception of Los Venerables. The mosaic was produced by T. Sarti of Pietrasanta and it was inaugurated on 25 June 1983. The sacristy contains a copy of Murillo's painting made by the Franciscan sisters of Egypt, and this had been the church's altarpiece before the mosaic was installed. Prior to this there had been another altarpiece which had originated from Paul Burlo's oratory.

The church also contains a titular statue of the Immaculate Conception which was made by R. Zanzio & Co in Rome in 1903 and which was donated to the church by the Archconfraternity of Saint Francis of Valletta in 1985. Two other titular statues had also been located within the church prior to 1985, the first of which had been ordered by Burlo for the oratory. The church also has statues of Saint Joseph and Our Lady of Sorrows; the latter is the work of the sculptor Wistin Camilleri.
