= Rotunda of Xewkija =

Roman Catholic church in Malta

Rotunda of St John the Baptist Knisja Arċipretali San Gwann Battista (in Maltese)
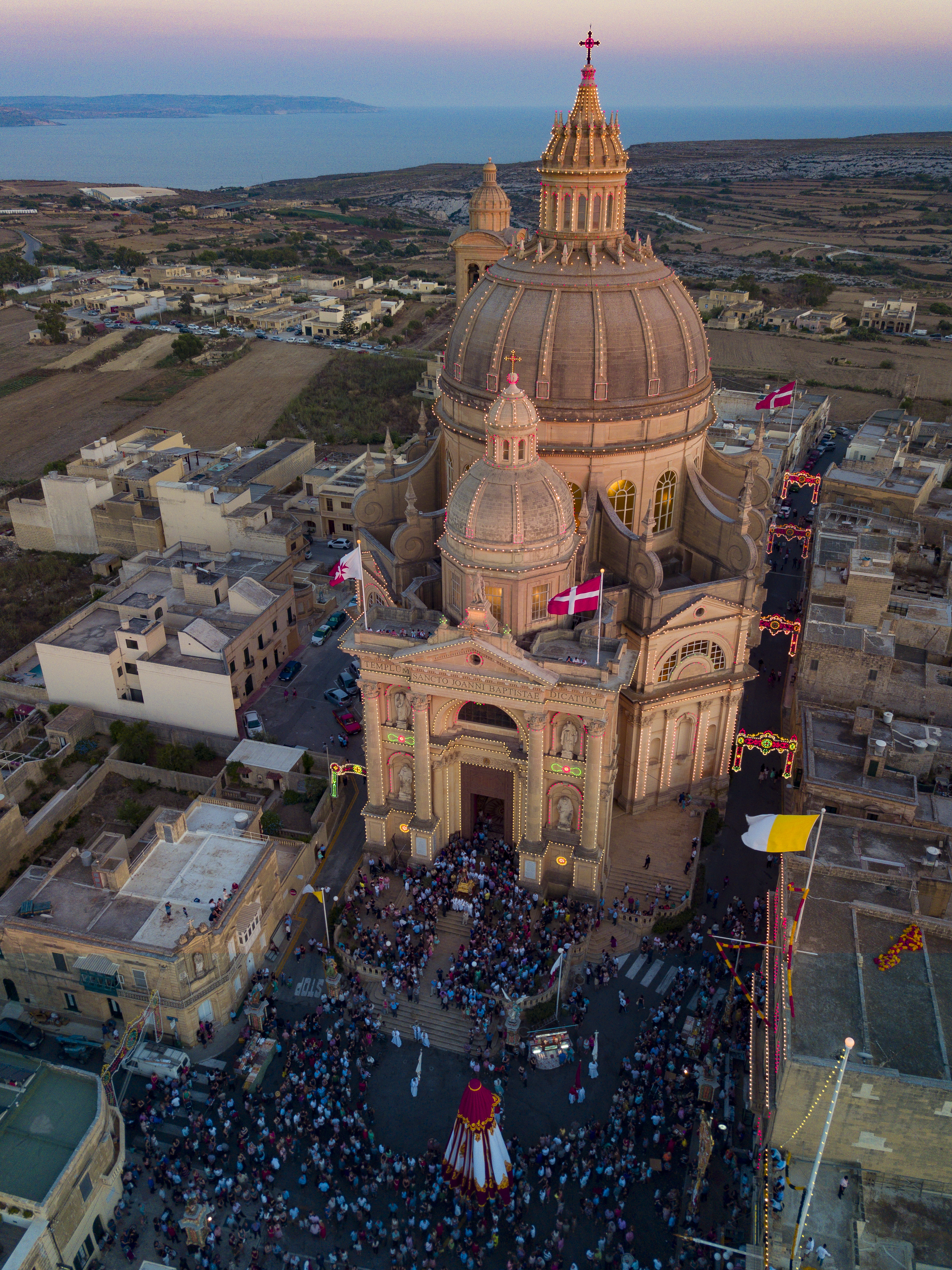
- Aerial view of the Rotunda of Xewkija

Religion
- Affiliation: Roman Catholic
- Province: Gozo
- Ecclesiastical or organisational status: Parish
- Year consecrated: 1978

Location
- Location: Xewkija, Gozo, Malta
- Interactive map of Rotunda of St John the Baptist; Knisja Arċipretali San Gwann Battista (in Maltese)
- Coordinates: 36°1′54″N 14°15′40″E

Architecture
- Architect: Ġużè Damato
- Type: Church
- Style: Baroque
- Groundbreaking: 1952
- Completed: 1978

Specifications
- Direction of façade: N
- Materials: Maltese Limestone

Website
- http://www.xewkijaparish.org

The Church of Saint John the Baptist, commonly known as the Rotunda of Xewkija or Xewkija Rotunda, is a Roman Catholic church in Xewkija, Gozo, Malta.

== History ==
On 27 November 1678, Bishop Miguel Jerónimo de Molina raised Xewkija from a hamlet to the status of a village, and as the first parish of Gozo outside the town.

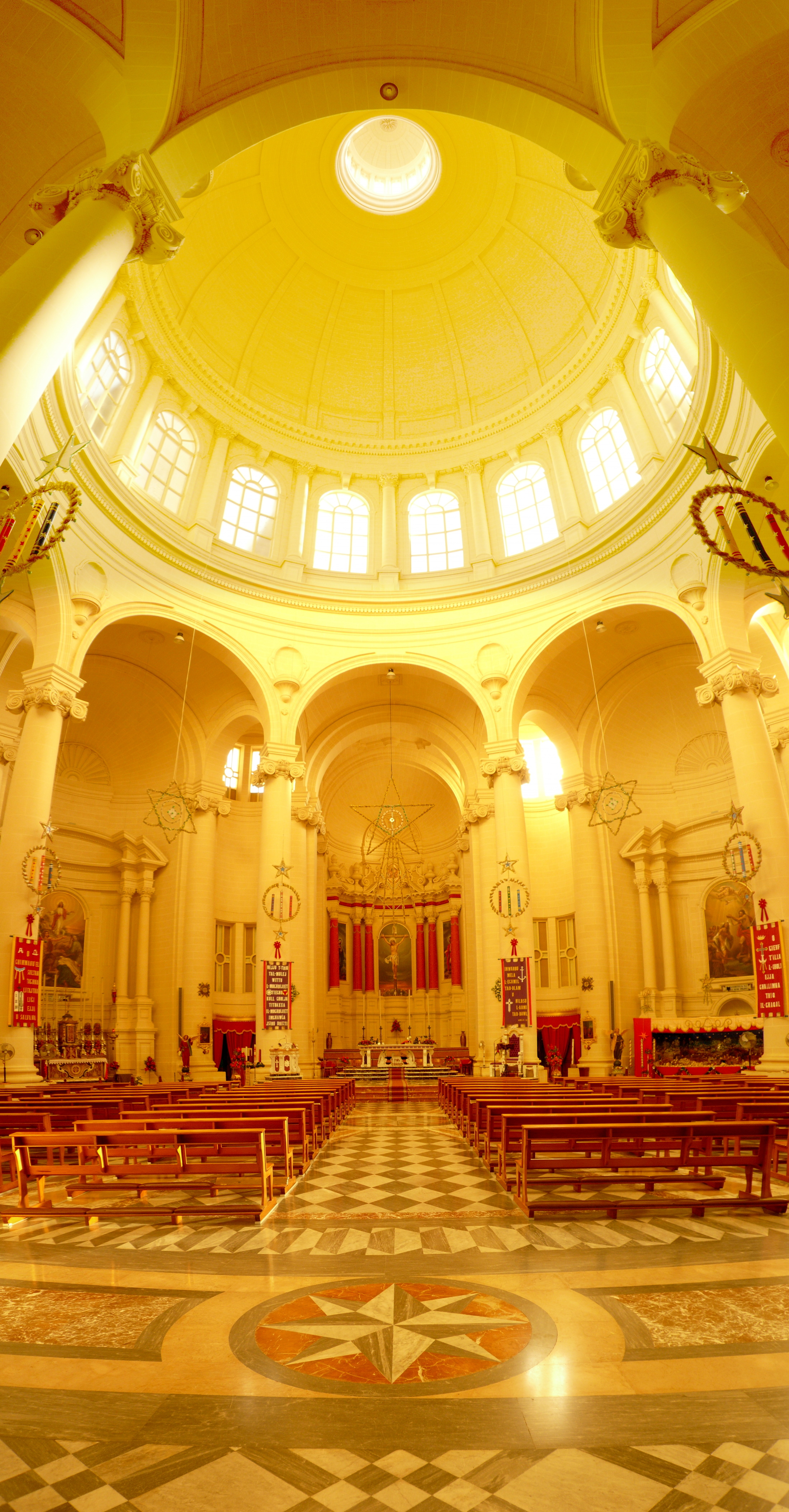
The interior

The parishioners, traditionally renowned for their craftsmanship and their building abilities in Maltese Limestone, expressed their wish to construct a bigger church. Built in the 20th century on the site of a previous church, the church was designed by the Maltese architect Ġużè Damato. Its dome internal diameter is 27 metres (89 ft). The dome is 75 metres (246 ft) high. Its calculated weight is 45,000 tons. The circumference is 85 metres (279 ft). The dome, supported by eight large concrete pilasters covered in stone, is the world's third-highest unsupported dome. The interior is decorated with fine sculpture and modern paintings. The floor is of polished Carrara marble. The Rotunda is the largest church in Gozo and one of Gozo's distinctive landmarks.

Damato's plans were based on the Church of Santa Maria della Salute in Venice, but on a larger scale. The foundation stone of the Rotunda was laid on 4 May 1952. The old church, which was rebuilt at least twice, was left in place as the Rotunda was being built around it, allowing for continued liturgical use. The church was officially consecrated on 17 June 1978.

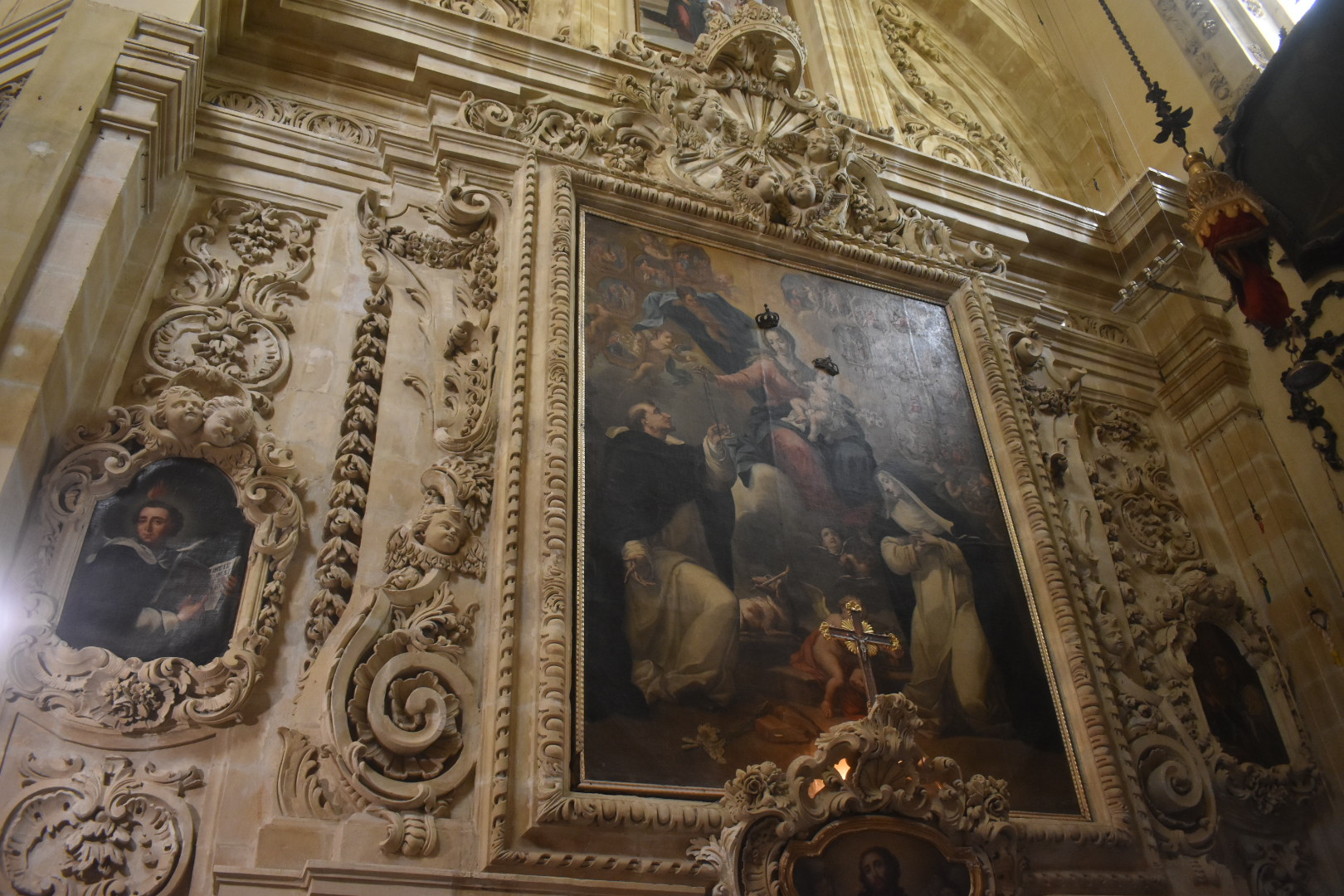
Sculpture and a paintings at the church museum

The old church was then carefully dismantled, and the best sculptures saved and placed in an adjacent building under the belfry, now known as the Sculpture Museum. It features the best "lacework" in Maltese stone, as well as some important items from the old church, including the main altar with the old titular painting. Within the Museum, an elevator gives access to the dome, which provides panoramic views of Gozo and the northern part of neighbouring Malta.

The Rotunda is dedicated to Saint John the Baptist. The parish celebrates its main feast of the Nativity of John the Baptist every 24 June, with external festivities on the closest Sunday. The parish's secondary feast is the Decollation of John the Baptist on 29 August.

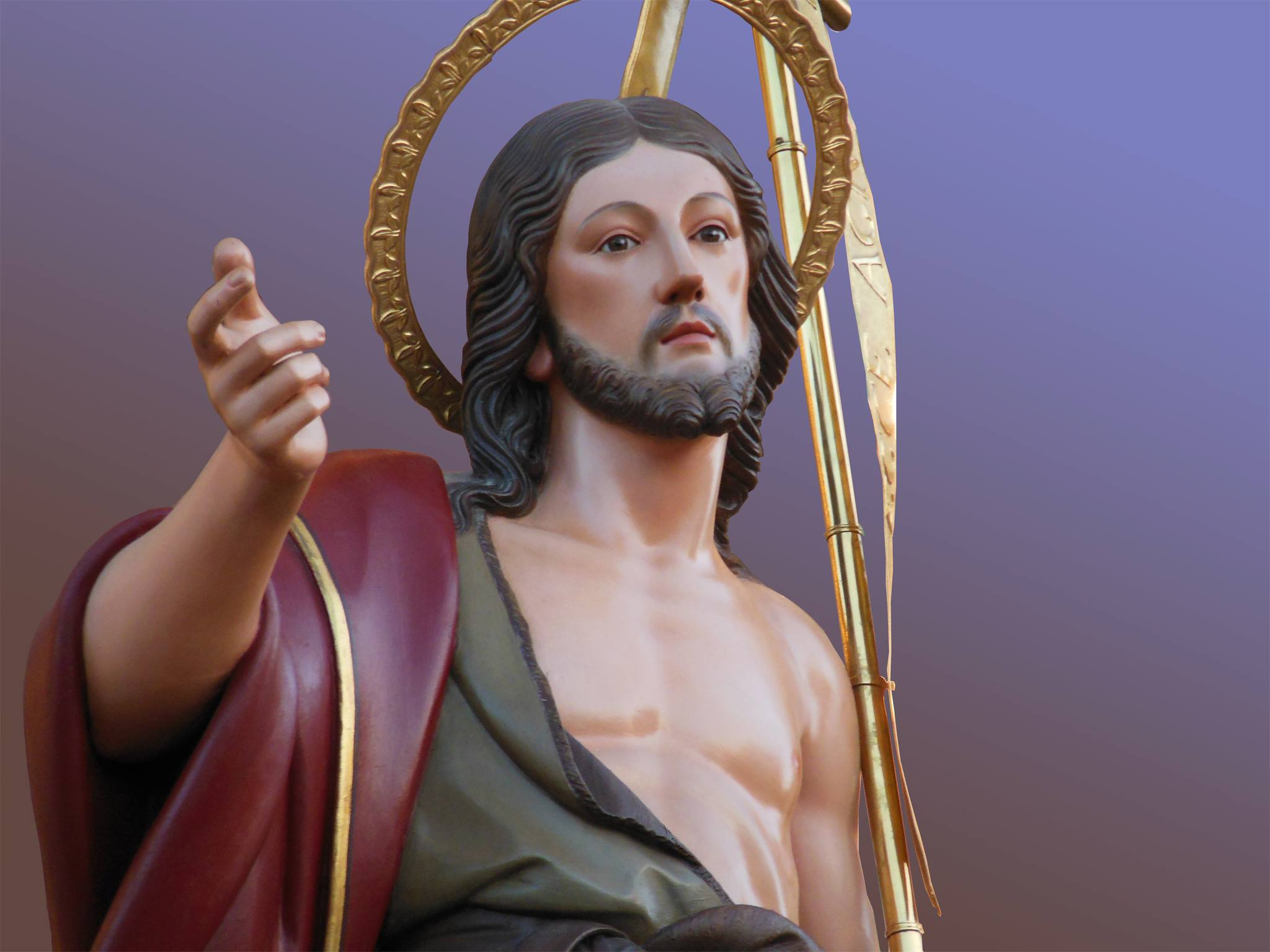
Titular statue of St. John Baptist kept in Xewkija Church, sculpted in wood by Pietro Paolo Azzopardi in 1845, Xewkija.

The Rotunda is also the Spiritual Seat for the Sovereign Military Order of Malta known also as the Knights of Malta.

The church building is listed on the National Inventory of the Cultural Property of the Maltese Islands.
