= Oreste Calleja =

Maltese playwright

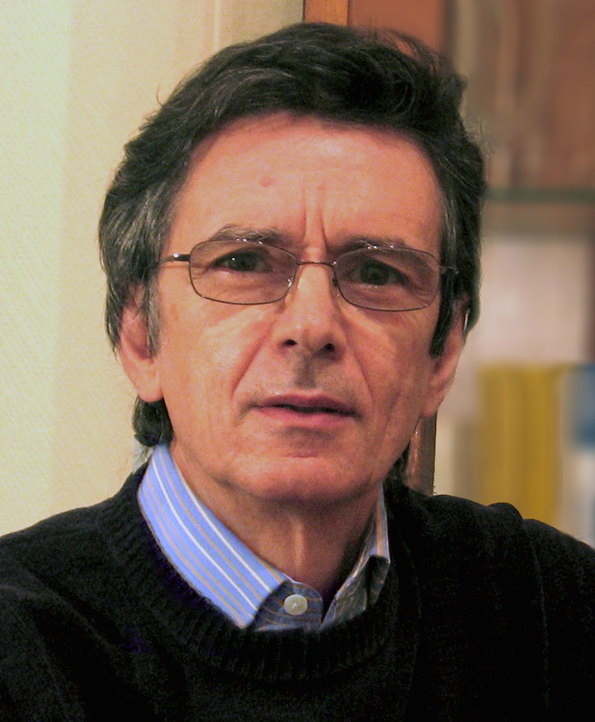
- Born: 20 November 1946 (age 79); Hamrun, Malta
- Occupation: Playwright
- Notable work: Pawlu Redux, Il-Festa bil-Bandieri
- Awards: Malta National Book Award for drama (for Pawlu Redux and Il-Festa bil-Bandieri)

Oreste Calleja (born 20 November 1946) is a Maltese playwright.

== Biography ==
Oreste Calleja was born in Hamrun, Malta. He studied at the Lyceum Grammar School and St Michael's Teachers’ Training College (1964–66). He attended the University of London, Birkbeck College in 1974-75, and in 1990, studied at North Florida University and Jacksonville University, Florida, from where he obtained a BA in Fine Arts and French in 1990. In the 1960s, Calleja was a committee member of the Moviment Qawmien Letterarju, and after a short stint of writing in English, he started writing plays for the stage, radio, and television in Maltese. For several years, his plays have featured in Maltese Literature national curricula in high schools and University courses.

Two of his plays, Pawlu Redux and Il-Festa bil-Bandieri, won the Malta National Book Award for drama. In 2011, a review in the Times of Malta called Calleja a "neglected Maltese playwright". Following in the tradition of Maltese playwright Francis Ebejer, Calleja's works depicted characters who were aspiring to a greater life but who inevitably faced insurmountable social and psychological hurdles. His themes are at once highly allegorical and ironic and ... encompass a world both universal and local.

== Plays ==
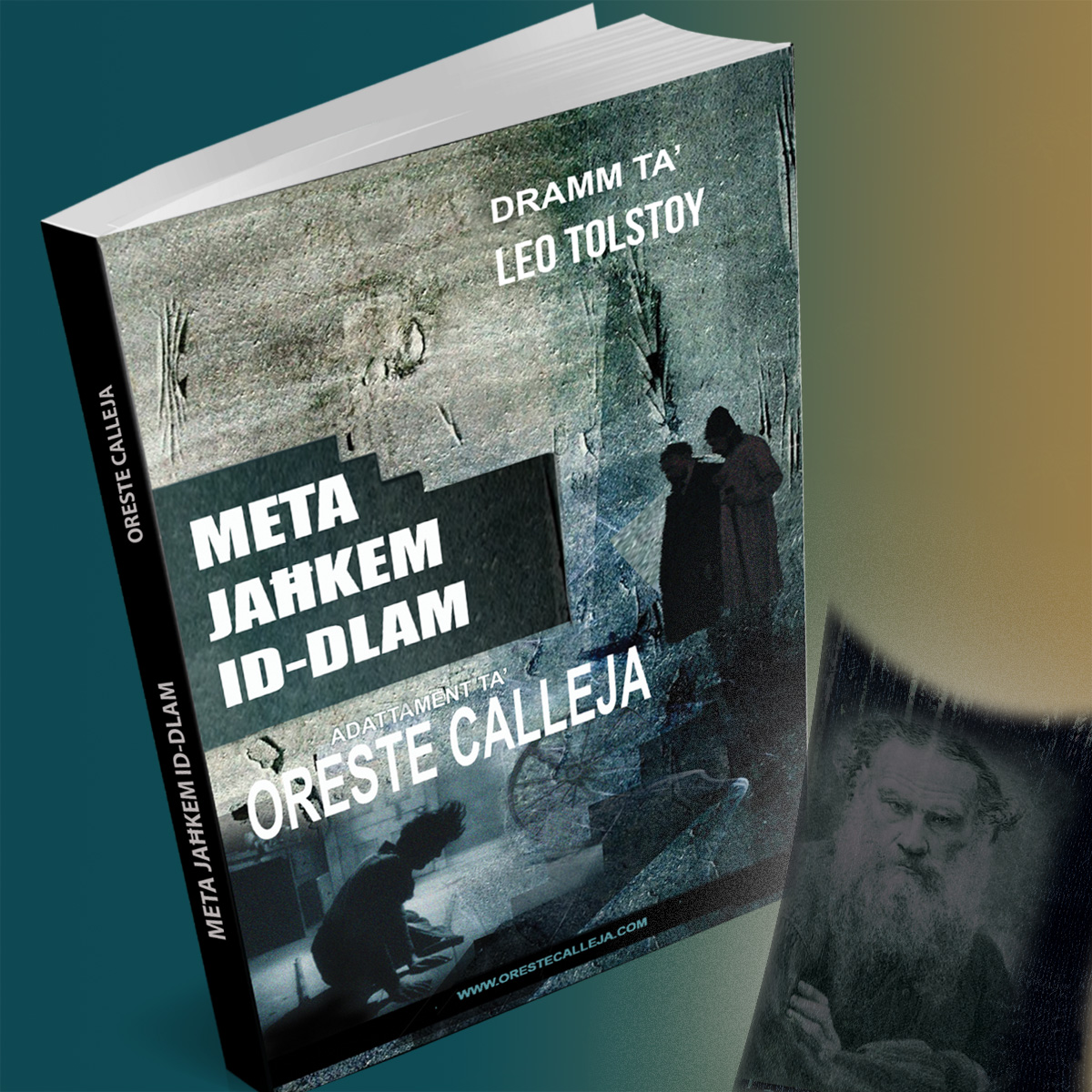

- Anestesija 1969
- Għargħar 1979
- Ċens Perpetwu 1969
- Satira 1970 • (above 4 plays published in "4 Drammi", 1972)
- Jum Fost l-Oħrajn 1970
- En Passant 1970
- Iġsmaiħirsa 1970
- Għasfur taċ-Ċomb 1993
- Il-Belliegħa fil-Bir 1994
- U l-Anġlu Ħabbar 1995
- Pawlu Redux 1999
- Il-Festa bil-Bandieri 2002
- Għażiż Angelo 2016
- Addijo Ċesri 2017
- Ċama Ċama, il-Monologi 2019
- And Unto Her An Angel - 2019

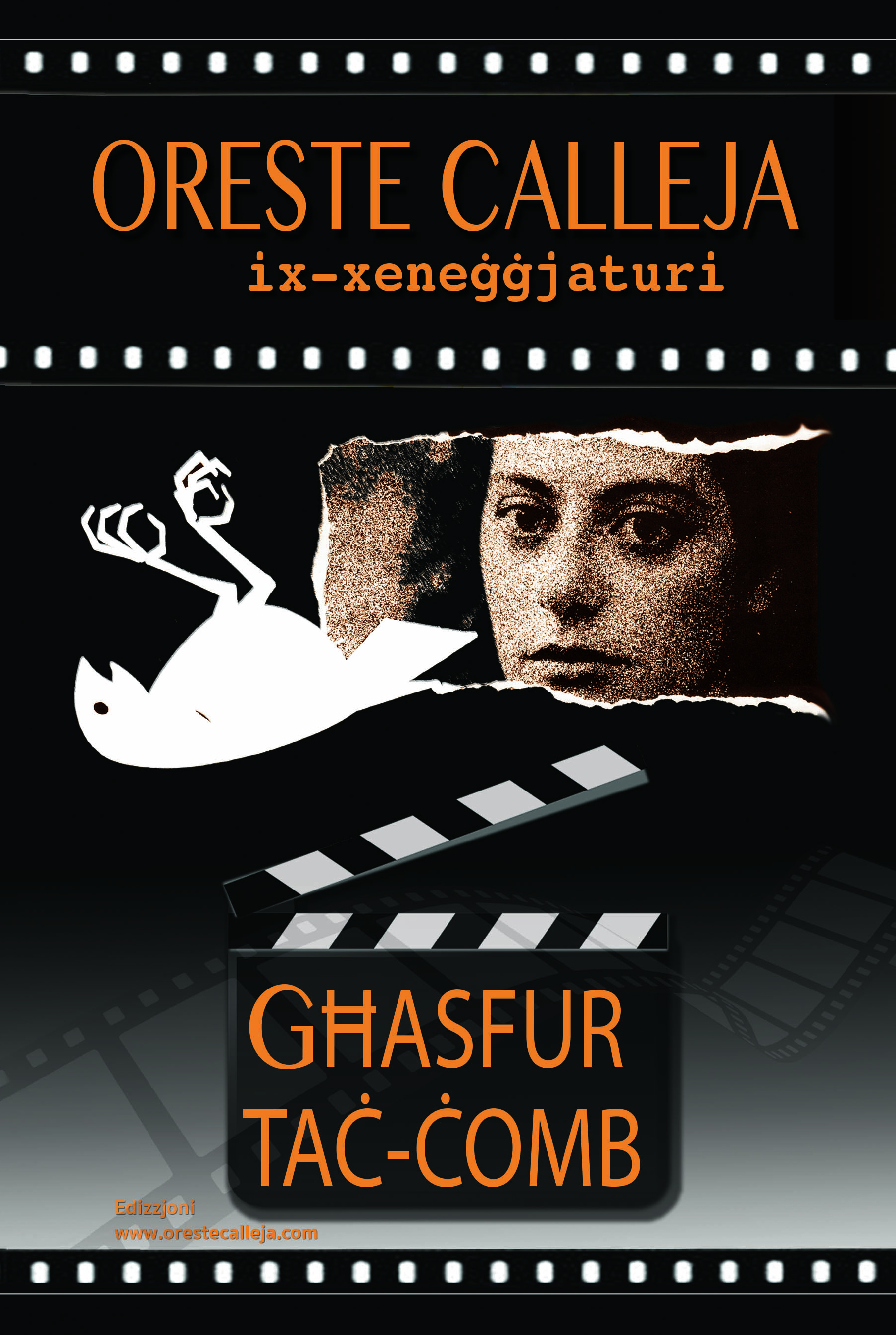
Screenplay adapatation of 3 Act Play by the same name

== Screenplay series ==
- Skart 2015
- Siltiet 2015
- Ghasfur taċ-Ċomb (the screenplay version) 2016
- Addijo Ċesri 2017
