= Parish Church of St Cajetan, Ħamrun =

Parish Church of St Cajetan of Thiene
- Knisja Parrokkjali ta' San Gejtanu ta' Thiene
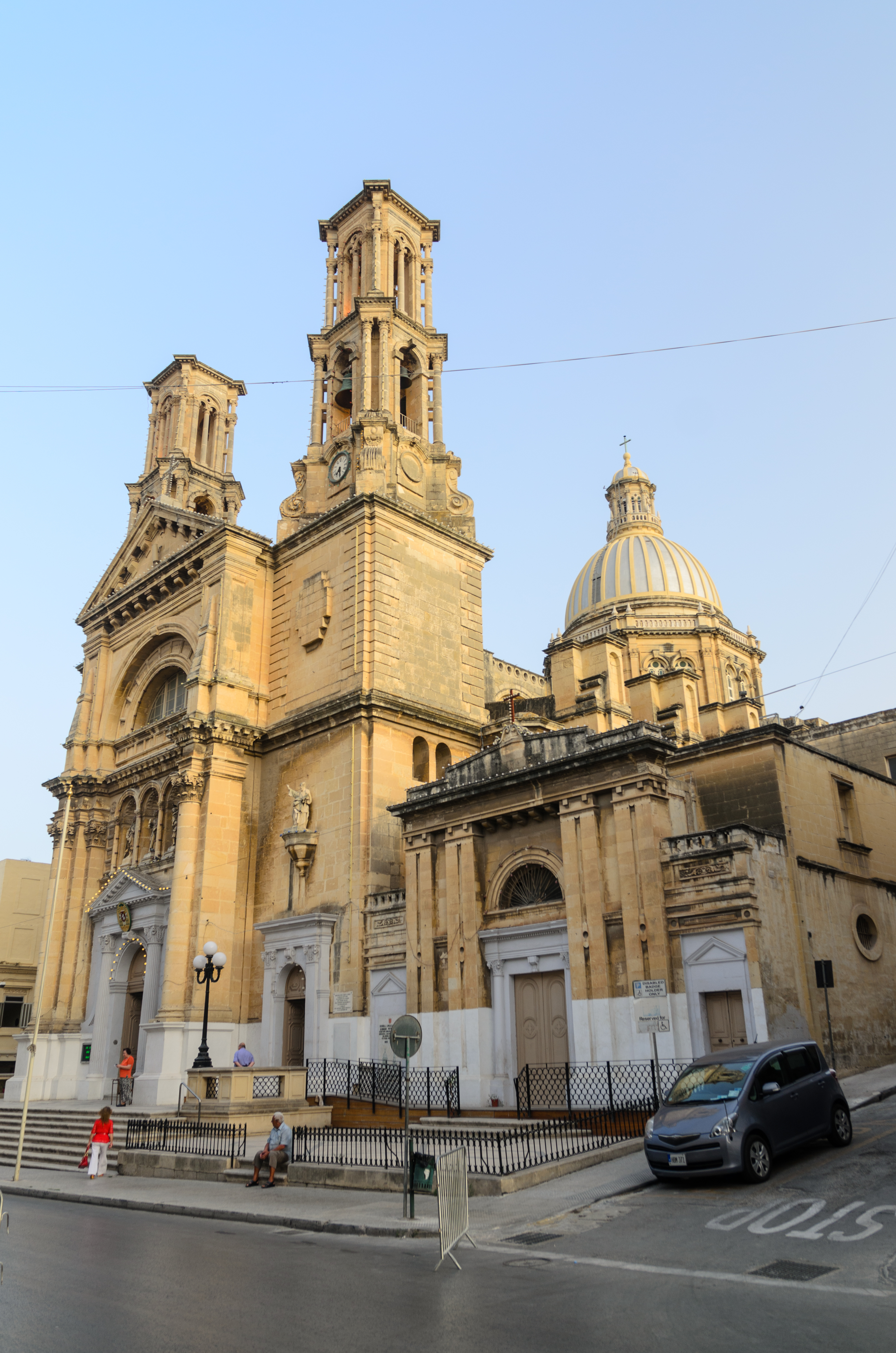
- View of the church
- Parish Church of St Cajetan of Thiene
- 35°53′11.4″N 14°29′13.9″E
- Location: Ħamrun
- Country: Malta
- Denomination: Roman Catholic
- Website: www.parroccasangejtanu.com

History
- Status: Parish church
- Dedication: Saint Cajetan
- Dedicated: 26 September 1930

Architecture
- Functional status: Active
- Architect(s): Giorgio Costantino Schinas; Andrea Grima (oratory); Andrea Vassallo (dome); Ġużè Damato (construction of dome)
- Style: Gothic Revival and Baroque
- Years built: 1869–1875; 1895 (oratory); 1953–1955 (dome)

Specifications
- Materials: Limestone

Administration
- Archdiocese: Malta

The Parish Church of St Cajetan of Thiene (Maltese: Knisja Parrokkjali ta' San Gejtanu ta' Thiene) is a Roman Catholic parish church in Ħamrun, Malta, dedicated to Saint Cajetan. The church was constructed between 1869 and 1875 to designs of Giorgio Costantino Schinas, in a combination of architectural styles. The oratory and dome were added later on in the 1890s and 1950s; the latter was designed by Andrea Vassallo and it was constructed under the direction of Ġużè Damato.

== History ==
As the settlement of Casale San Giuseppe (as Ħamrun was then known) began to grow in the 19th century, the two old churches dedicated to Our Lady of Atocia (tas-Samra) and Our Lady of Porto Salvo (ta' Nuzzu) became too small to cater for the area. Therefore, the decision was taken to construct a new church, and it was dedicated to Saint Cajetan according to the wishes of Bishop Gaetano Pace Forno, instead of Saint Joseph, to whom there was popular devotion in the area.

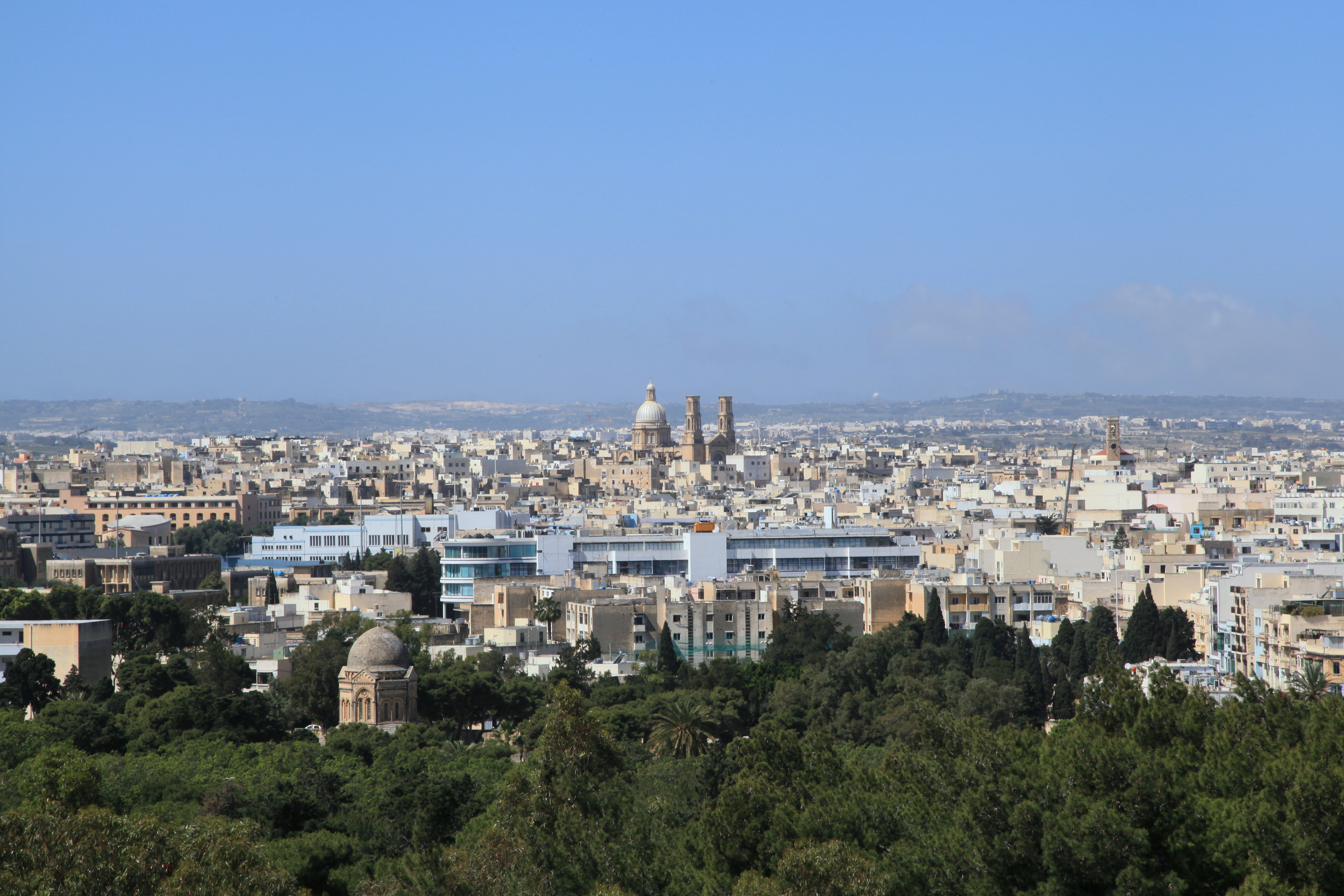
The Ħamrun skyline as seen from Floriana, dominated by the church's bell towers and dome

The foundation stone of the new church was laid down on 13 June 1869, on a plot of land donated by the Judge Giovanni Conti. Funds were raised by the government, the population and some benefactors, and the building was designed by the architect Giorgio Costantino Schinas. The building was completed in 1875, being inaugurated on 11 July of that year by Bishop Carmelo Scicluna. At the time of its construction, the area still formed part of the parish of Qormi, but Ħamrun became a separate parish on 1 December 1881, with the Church of St. Cajetan becoming the parish church. The church was dedicated on 26 September 1930.

The oratory was added in 1895, to designs of Andrea Grima. The dome was designed in the 1920s by Andrea Vassallo, but construction was delayed for a number of decades before it was actually built between 13 April 1953 and 20 April 1955, under the direction of Ġużè Damato. Despite being constructed decades after his death, the dome was built to his original designs with structural alterations made by Damato.

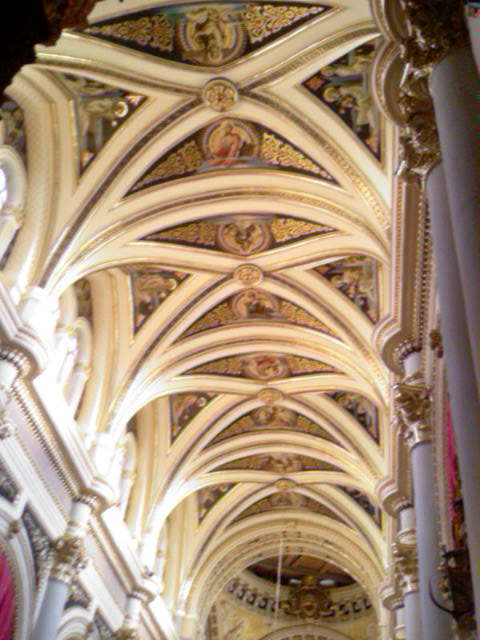
The church's ceiling

The titular statue depicting Saint Cajetan was sculpted between 1885 and 1888 by Karlu Darmanin, with the pedestal being made by Giovanni Farrugia and the detachable platform by Antonio Sciortino. The altarpiece depicts Saint Cajetan receiving the baby Jesus from Mary, and it was painted by the Italian artist Pietro Gagliardi. Other works of art in the church include paintings by G. Briffa, Raphael Bonnici, Ramiro Calì, Emvin Cremona and other Maltese and Italian artists. The interior of the dome contains paintings by Emvin Cremona. Parts of the church's interior were altered following the Second Vatican Council, with the main altar being replaced, and some side altars being replaced by confessionals.

The centenary of the parish was celebrated in 1981 with the relics of Saint Cajetan being temporarily brought over to the church.

Restoration works have been undertaken on the dome interior, and on a number of paintings located in the church. Thirty solar panels were installed on the roof in 2012.

== Architecture ==
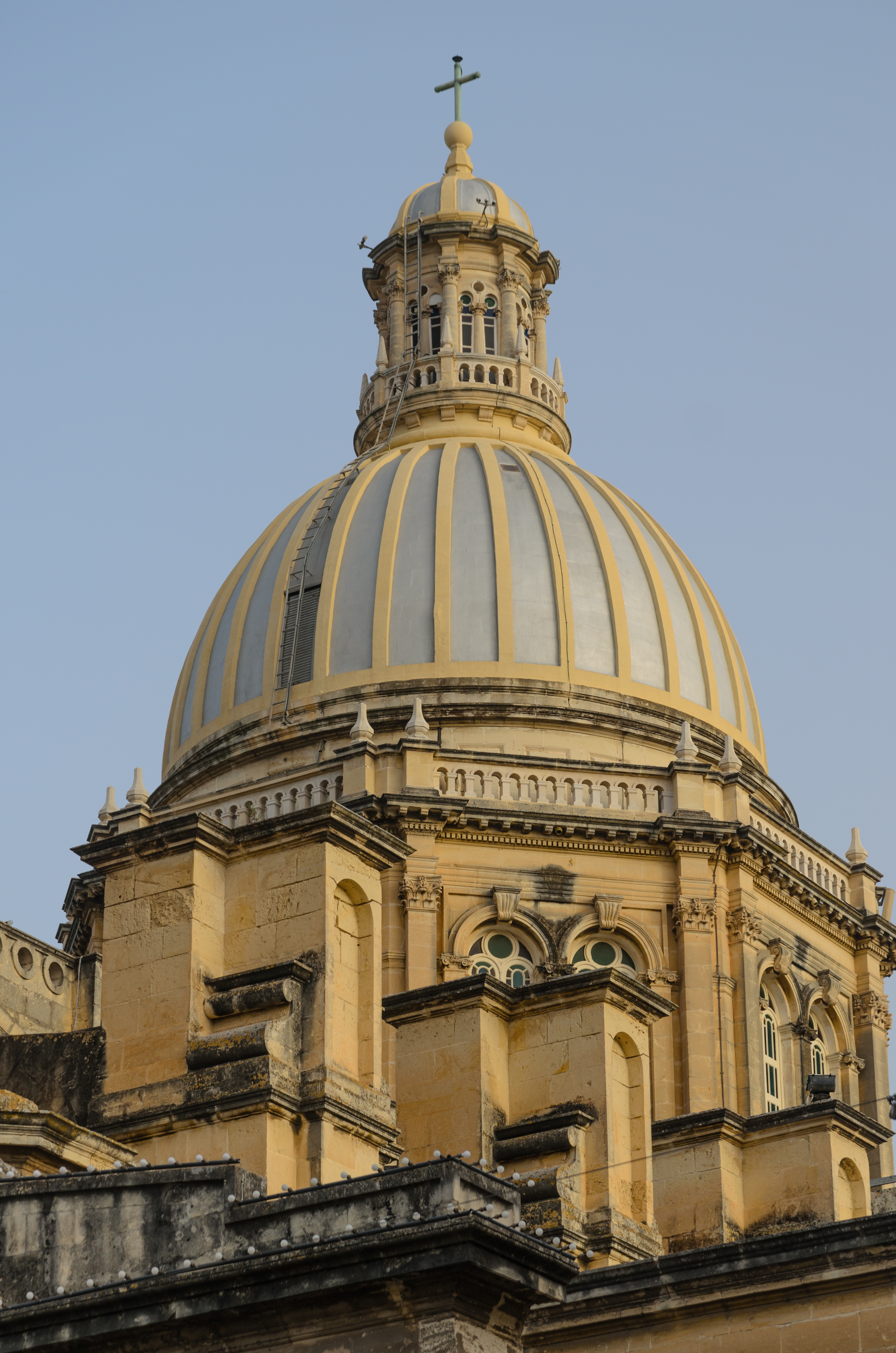
The dome

The Parish Church of St. Cajetan has a cruciform plan, with two side aisles and a short choir. The two bell towers are the highest in Malta, and together with the dome they dominate Ħamrun's skyline. The church is built in a combination of several architectural styles, exhibiting influences from a number of medieval and classical sources. In particular, it draws from the French Gothic style, especially from the Laon Cathedral, and from the Venetian Baroque church of Santa Maria della Salute.

The church's dome is regarded as being one of the finest in Malta. Schinas' original plan was to have a Romanesque turret-like structure similar to those found at Mainz Cathedral and the Basilica of Saint-Sernin, Toulouse, but these would have been alien to the Maltese environment. Vassallo designed the present dome decades after the construction of the church, but it is harmonious to the rest of the building. It draws inspiration from the dome of Santa Maria della Salute, and it is also bears some similarities to the dome of the Parish Church of St. Nicholas in Siġġiewi, which had been designed by Vassallo in 1919.
