= Hamrun =

Hamrun Il-Ħamrun Casal San Giuseppe
- Local council
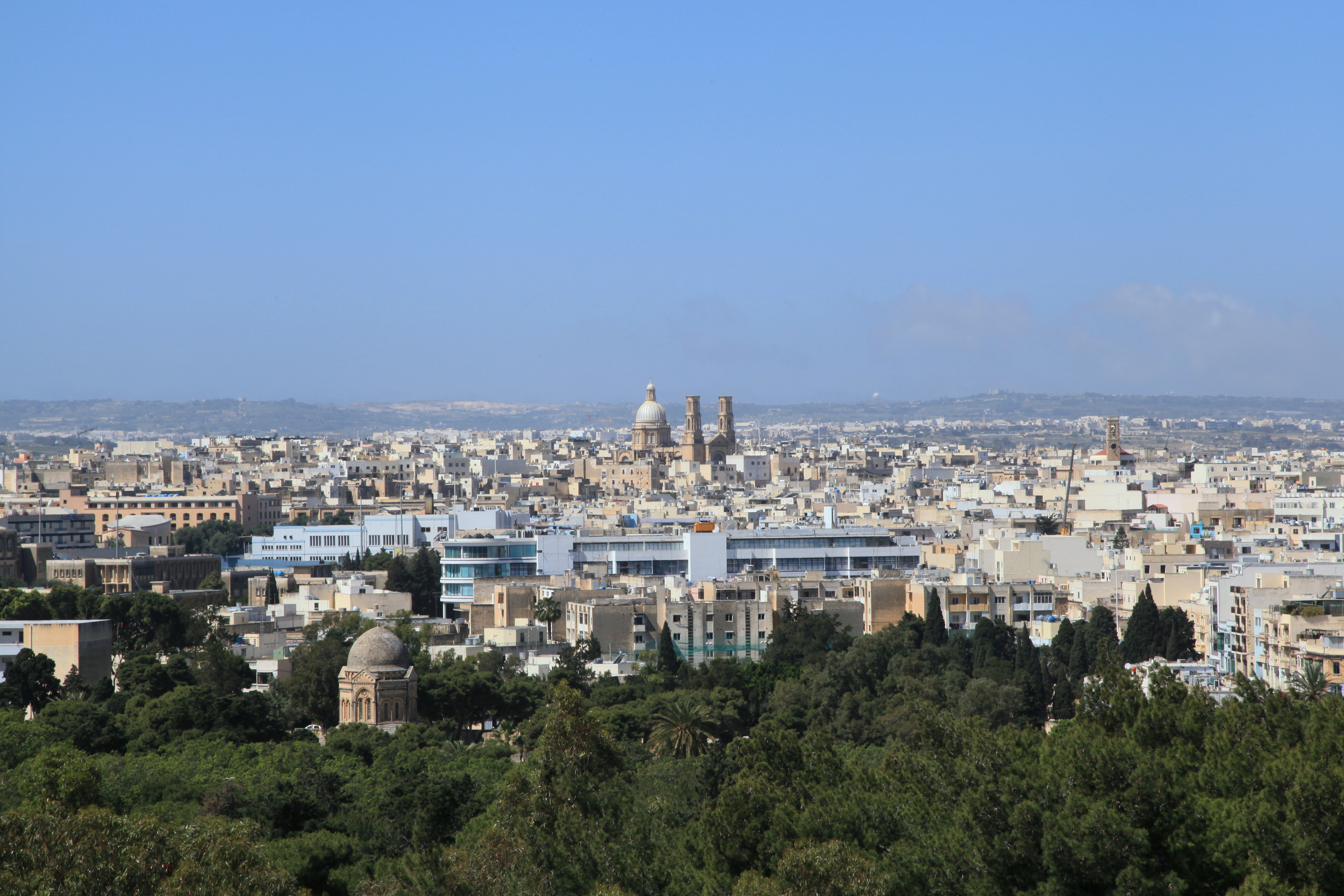
- Hamrun skyline

- Flag Coat of arms
- Motto(s): Propera pulse (I grow rapidly)
- Coordinates: 35°53′10″N 14°29′22″E
- Country: Malta
- Region: Southern Region
- District: Northern Harbour District
- Borders: Floriana, Marsa, Msida, Pietà, Qormi, Santa Venera

Government
  - Mayor: Christian Sammut (PL)

Area
  - Total: 1.1 km^{2} (0.42 sq mi)

Population (Jul. 2024)
  - Total: 11,936
  - Density: 11,000/km^{2} (28,000/sq mi)
- Demonym(s): Ħamruniż (m), Ħamruniża (f), Ħamruniżi (pl); Tas-Sikkina, Ta' Werwer
- Time zone: UTC+1 (CET)
  - Summer (DST): UTC+2 (CEST)
- Postal code: HMR
- Dialing code: 356
- ISO 3166 code: MT-18
- Patron saint: Saint Cajetan; Immaculate Conception; Saint Joseph
- Day of festa: Second Sunday of August; First Sunday of July; First Sunday of May
- Website: Official website

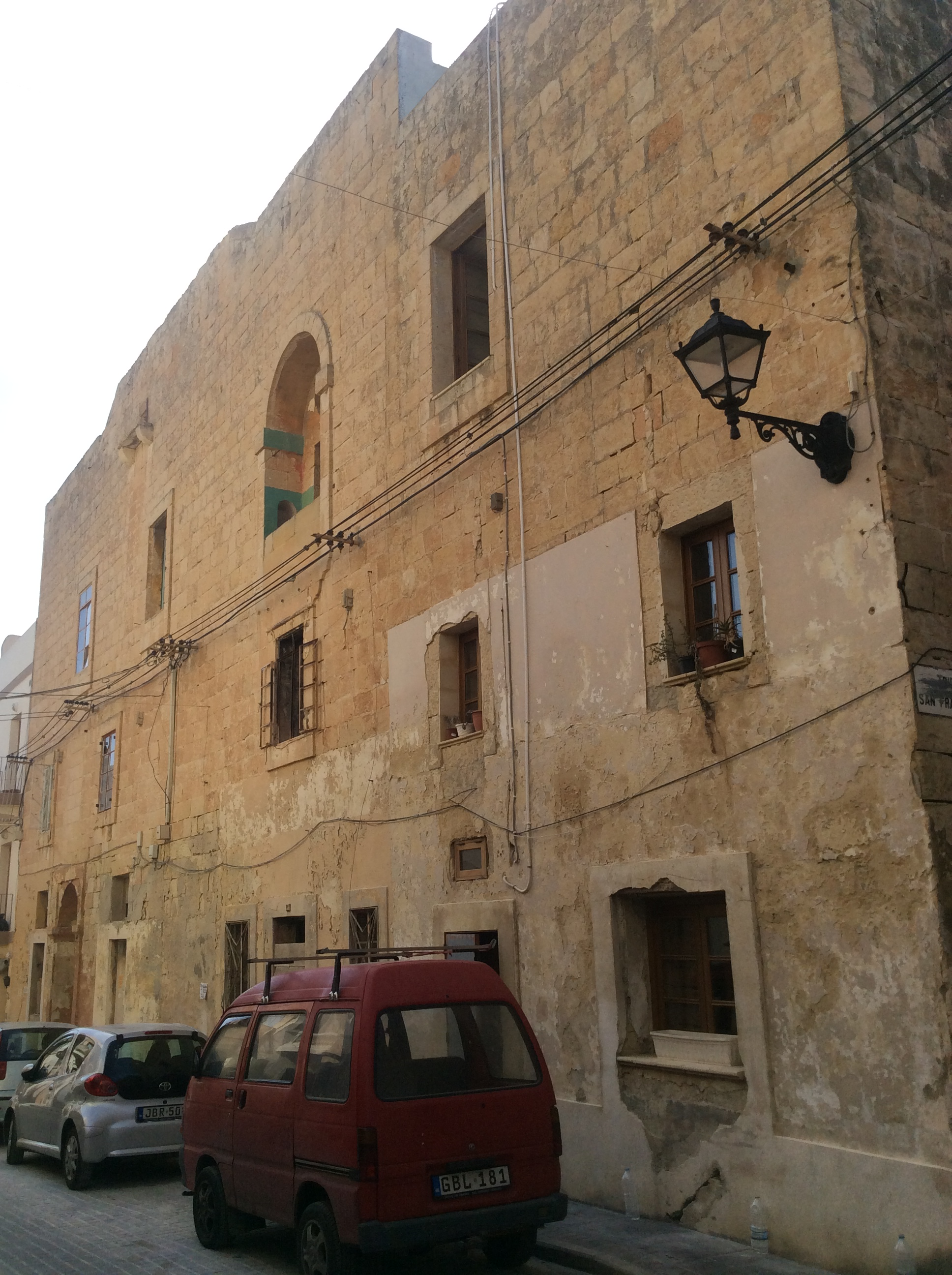
A 17th-century palace near the Chapel of Our Lady of Atocia, said to be the oldest building in Hamrun

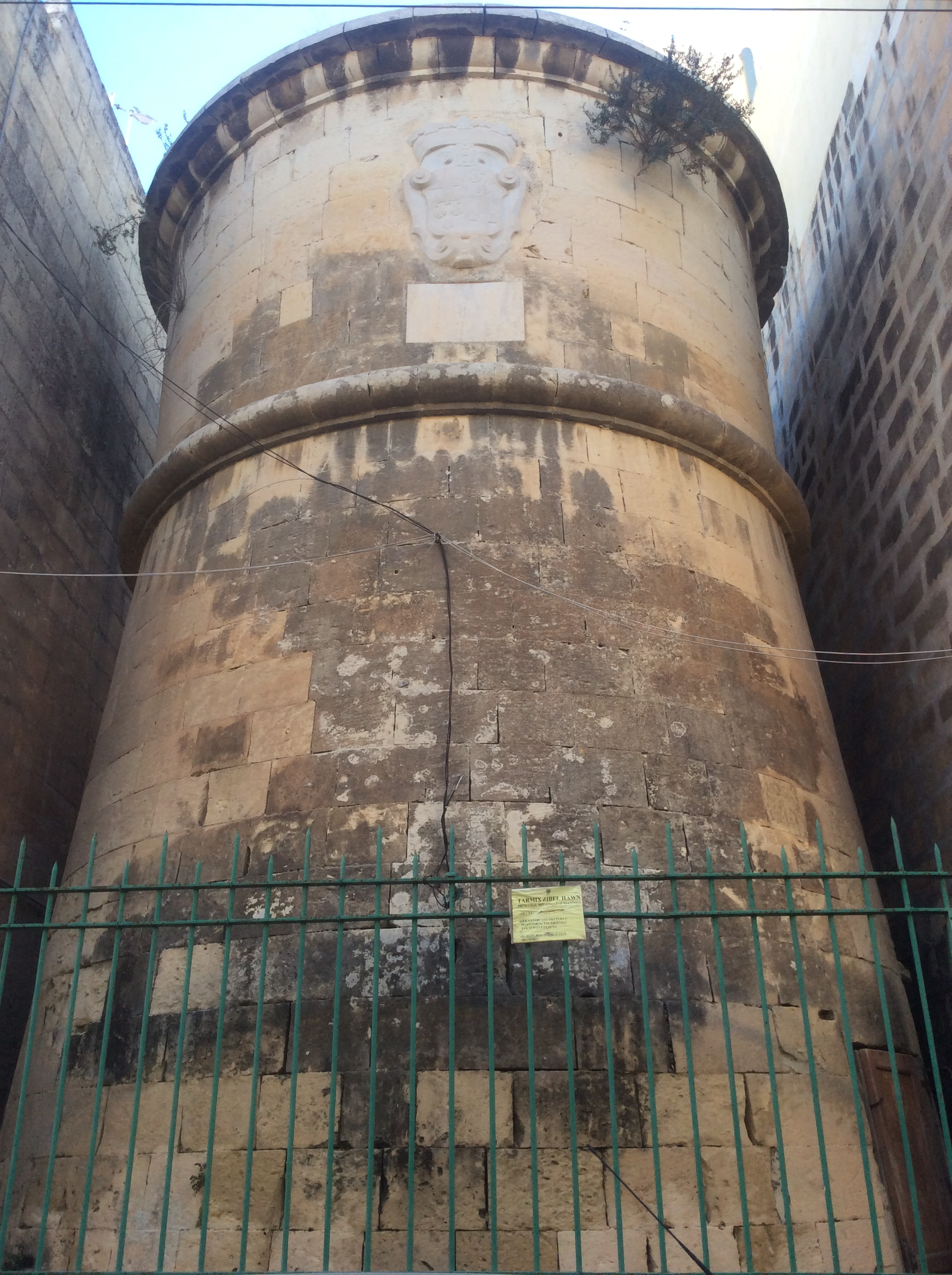
Il-Monument tat-Tromba, a water tower built in the 17th century as part of the Wignacourt Aqueduct

Hamrun (Maltese: Ħamrun [ħɐmˈruːn]) is a town in the Southern Region of Malta, with a population of 10,514 as of November 2021.

== The people ==
The townspeople are traditionally known as Tas-Sikkina (literally meaning 'of the knife' or 'the knife-wielders') or as Ta' Werwer (which literally means 'those who terrify' or more colloquially, 'the terrifying ones'). This appellation could stem from the fact that a considerable number of Ħamruniżi used to work as stevedores on the docks and thus carried a knife at all times. Another theory was that the community of Sicilians who settled here illegally in the 16th century danced a traditional dance which involved the wielding of small stilettos which they carried in their socks, waving them in the air and back to their sheaths.

=== Notable residents ===
Although born in Valletta, George Preca (founder of the Society of Christian Doctrine) lived most of his life in Hamrun. He is buried in a Chapel in Hamrun. It is the home town of former Labour Prime Minister Karmenu Mifsud Bonnici and of Presidents Anton Buttigieg and Guido de Marco. The founder of the Malta United Workers' Union (UHM), Salvino Spiteri, was born and lived here.

Hamrun gave birth to several important artists and men of letters. Notable persons from Hamrun are the actor and lyrical singer Oreste Kirkop, who is remembered mostly for his role in the 1956 Hollywood film The Vagabond King, and Maltese poet and theatre director Mario Azzopardi (born in 1944), who has a strong reputation for introducing new, radical poetry in Malta in the Sixties and who became the artistic director of the Malta Drama Centre (est. 1979).

Josephine Zammit Cordina is a well-known actress and TV personality. She is also associated with Australia being the presenter of the Radio Programme "Boomerang" and TV programme "Waltzing Matilda". She was honoured by the Government of Malta (Ġieħ Ir-Republika) and the Government of Australia (Honorary Member of the Order of Australia). Il-Kavallier tal-Irkotta. Joe Zammit Cordina (Josephine's brother in-law) was also a well-known actor and TV personality. He took part in a number of International Films in minor character roles. The Airport scene in "Midnight Express" is well remembered. He was also Mayor of Hamrun.

Another modern poet, Victor Fenech (b. 1936), involved for many years as a drama critic, also hails from Hamrun. From the romantic school of literature one should mention Rev. Frans Camilleri, also born in this town. Hamrun also gave birth to film director Mario Philip Azzopardi (born in 1950), who is not to be confused with Mario Azzopardi the poet and drama animator (also born in Hamrun in 1944). Mario Philip settled in Canada and has many commercial film titles and TV serials to his credit. The other Mario Azzopardi is a well-known poet and animator, accredited with introducing new forms of literature to the island.

Joseph Buttigieg, distinguished Marxist literary scholar at the University of Notre Dame, and father of South Bend, Indiana mayor and United States Secretary of Transportation Pete Buttigieg, was born in Hamrun.

Hamrun is also the home town of playwright Oreste Calleja (b. 1946), an acclaimed author who wrote important new-genre plays in the native language, and also the home for a number of years of Bjorn Formosa M.Q.R, the ALS Malta founder, who in 2017 was also honoured with Ġieħ il-Ħamrun.

Due to the prominence of the St. Cajetan Parish Church, many residents carry the name of the patron saint, generally in Maltese or in Italian.

== Culture ==
Hamrun is increasingly becoming a cultural melting pot, especially in culinary terms. It organises an annual chocolate festival where chocolatiers from all Malta demonstrate their artistry.

Cuisines available in Hamrun, apart from the contemporary local one, such as an art-deco café, amongst others include Turkish, Afghan, West African, East African, Syrian, Filipino, Indian, Colombian and Italian cuisine.

=== Churches ===
Our Lady of Atoċja Chapel is the oldest chapel in Hamrun.

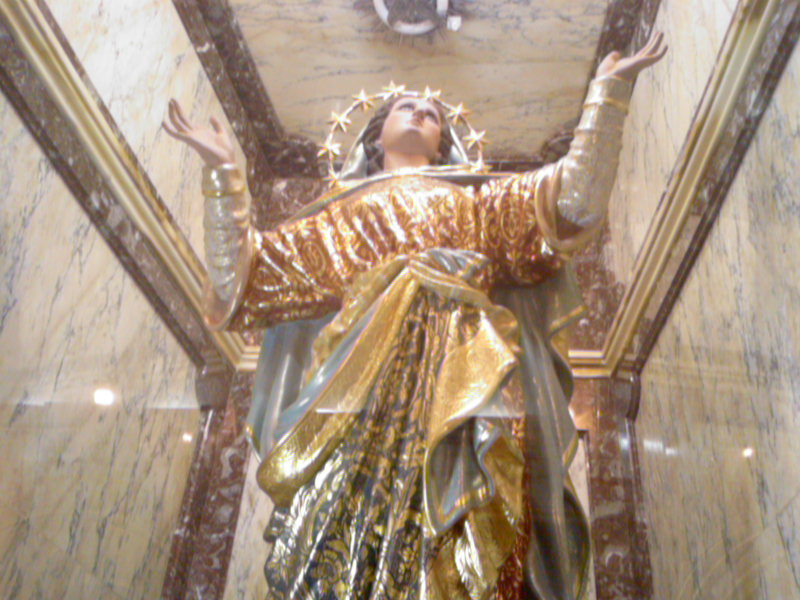
Our Lady of Atoċja

It was built in the early 17th century by a merchant trader who brought the painting of the Madonna from Atocha in Spain. The people from Hamrun refer to it as Tas-Samra. During the French blockade of 1798–1800, Maltese insurgents built a battery near the chapel.

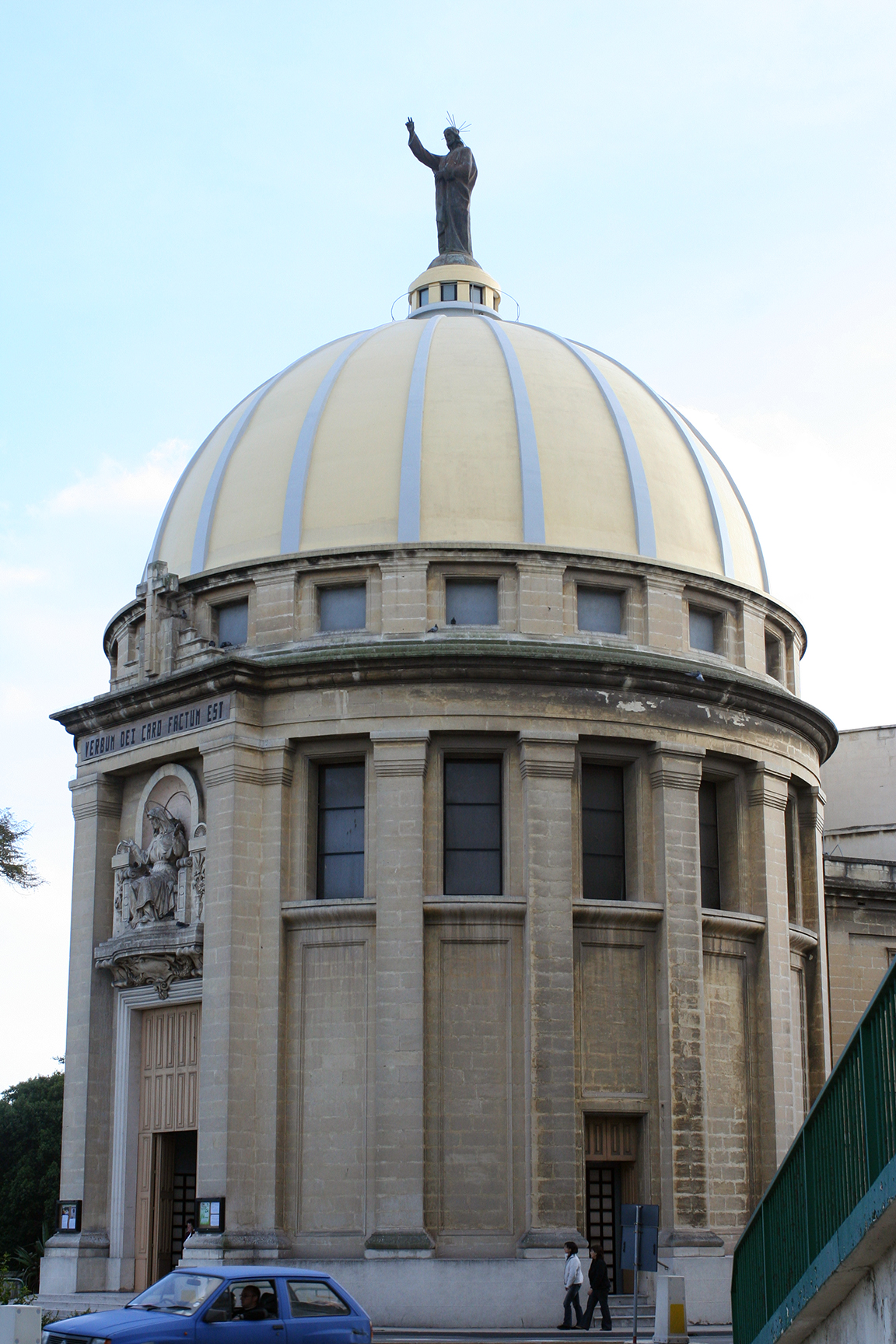
Our Lady of the Miraculous Medal Church

Our Lady of the Miraculous Medal Church is the Motherhouse of the Society of Christian Doctrine founded by Saint George Preca. In fact, he was buried in the crypt of the Church. On a Wednesday, in Passiontide, a Procession of Christ the Redeemer walks through Strada Rjali (Hamrun Main Road). The Procession starts adjacent to Our Lady of the Miraculous Medal Church and ends when the Statue of Jesus Christ is inside Saint Cajetan Sanctuary. The procession is accompanied by band funeral marches and the 1st Hamrun Scout Group.

The Chapel of Porto Salvo was built in 1736 and it was conceived as a village chapel. It is built in the Baroque Style. Today the chapel is used mostly for the adoration of the Holy Eucharist. The local refer to the chapel as Ta' Santu Nuzzo.

Immaculate Conception Parish Church was built in the 1960s to cater for the large population of Hamrun. In architectural terms the church has a very plain and neat design. In 1973 it became the first parish to receive the Neocatechumenal Way, from where it spread to another 26 parishes in the Maltese Islands. The Neocatechumenal Way is also present in St. Cajetan Parish. Together these two parishes have 13 'communities' with around 450 members.

St. Francis of Assisi Church was built in the 1950s by the Franciscan Community to cater for the local community.

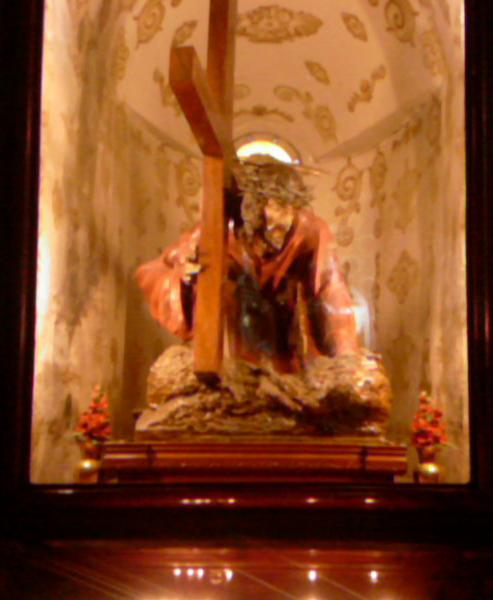
Christ the Redeemer, St Cajetan Parish, Hamrun

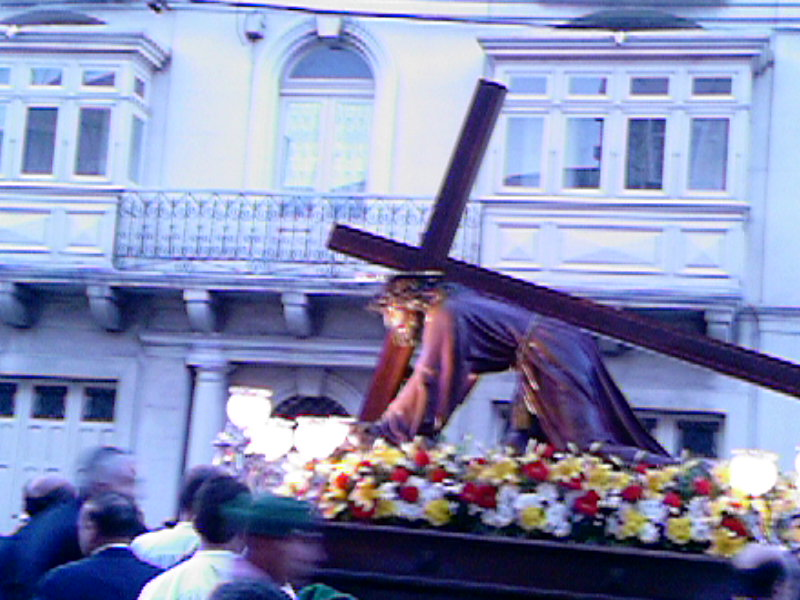
Purcissjoni ta' Gesu' Redentur, Hamrun

St. Cajetan Parish Church was built in the latter half of the 19th century. Originally it was intended to name the church for St. Joseph. However Bishop Gaetano Pace Forno wanted to name the church after his patron saint. The church is built in a Neo-Gothic style. Its interior was painted by Emvin Cremona. The statue of Saint Cajetan was done by Carlo Darmanin.

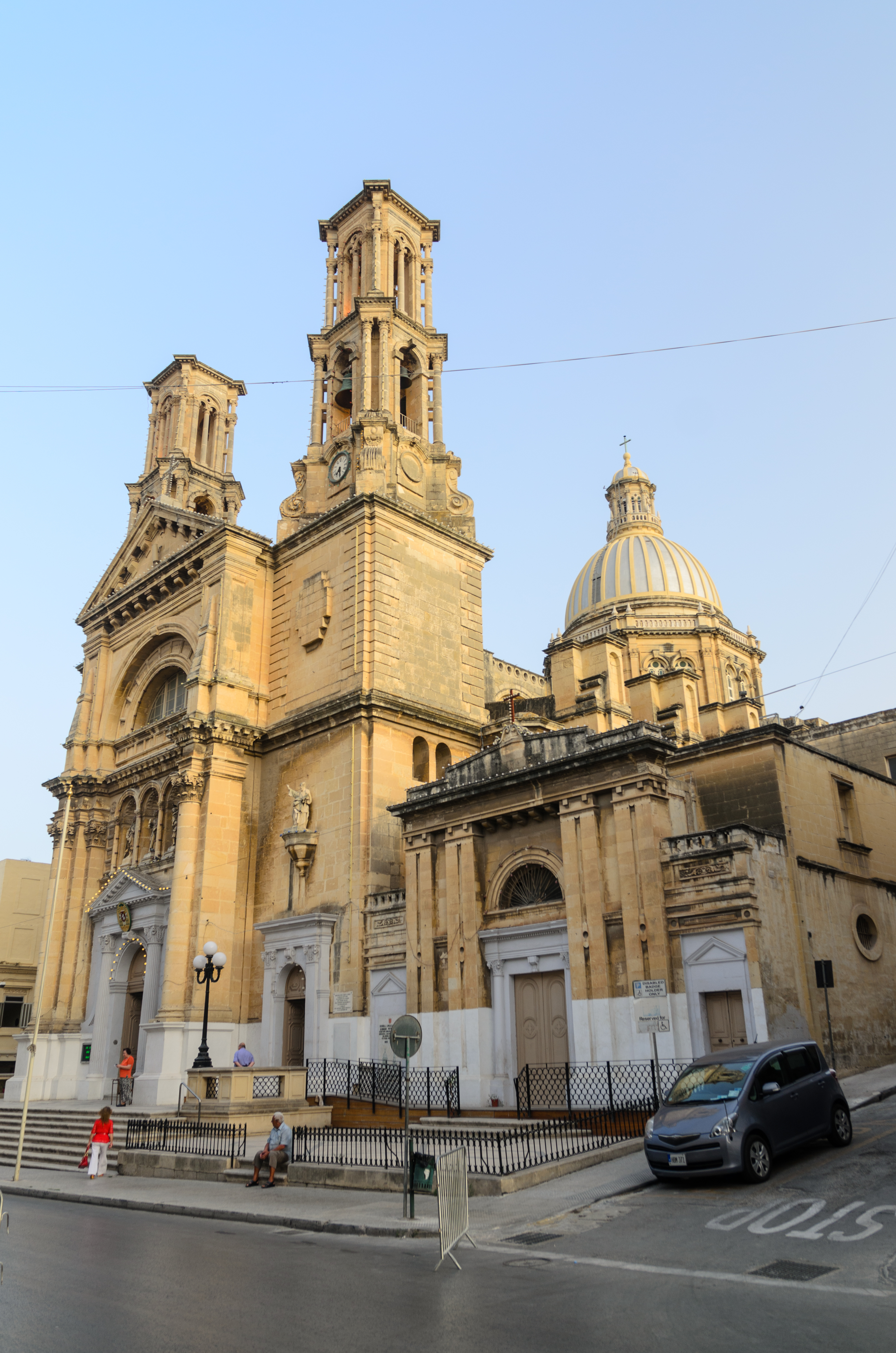
Parish Church of St. Cajetan

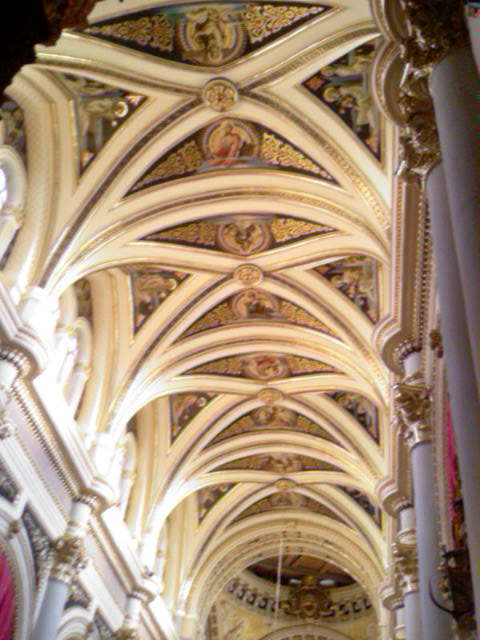
Interior of the Parish Church of St. Cajetan

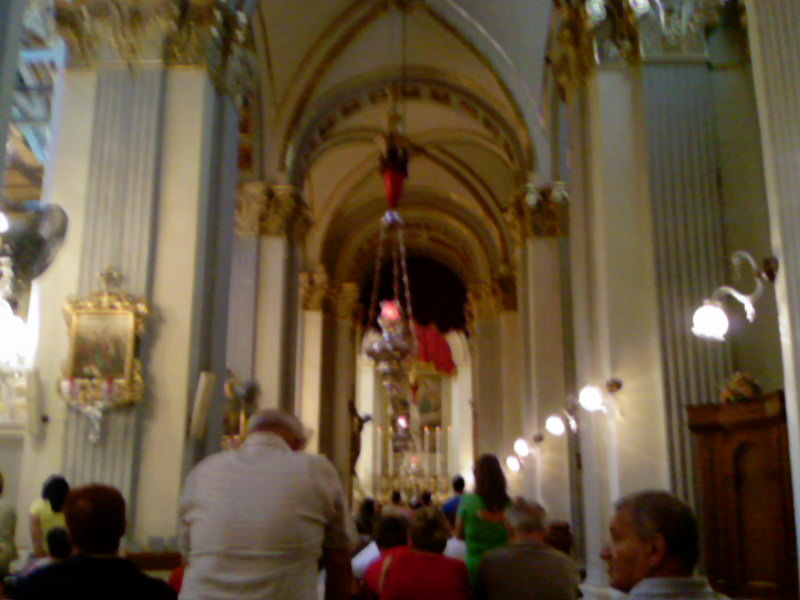
Parish Church of St. Cajetan

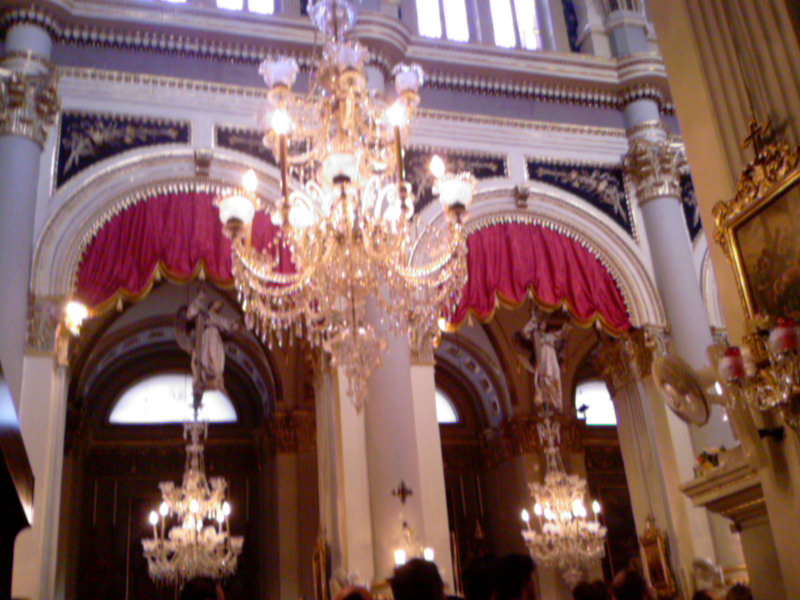
Parish Church of St. Cajetan

=== Feast ===
The Patron Saints of Hamrun are Saint Cajetan, the Immaculate Conception and Saint Joseph. Saint Cajetan's feast is celebrated on the first Sunday after 7 August and the Immaculate Conception feast is celebrated in the first Sunday of July. St Cajetan's feast generates a lot of commerce in the Hamrun district. The Parish church was designed by George Schinas. Construction of the church was finished in 1875. The titular painting was done by Pietro Gagliardi in Rome. The statue of St Cajetan is the work of eminent Maltese sculptor Charles Darmanin and was completed in 1885.

There are three band clubs in Hamrun; St Joseph's band club, St Cajetan's band club and the Immaculate Conception band club, the only band in the Immaculate Conception Parish. St Cajetan's, or as it is also known "tat-Tamal" and St Joseph's, or as it is also known "Tal-Miskina", hold marathon marches "Marċ tal-brijju" on the day of the feast starting early in the morning and ending late in the afternoon. There is great rivalry between the two band clubs, which makes for one of the most exciting feasts in Malta. Both band club are over a century old; St Joseph's was the first band club, set up shortly after the formation of the parish in 1889, whereas St Cajetan's was formed in 1907.

The two band clubs are associated with two different colours; red for St Cajetan's Band Club whilst blue for St Joseph's Band Club. Supporters of the band clubs surround their respective marching band decked out in clothes and head bands and carrying flags of the same colour as that of their club. Hand-held fire works, especially noisy ones, are set off along the parade route and supporters shower the bands and their supporters with streamers and confetti from balconies and roofs. At times, the confetti look like a heavy snow storm. Little children run around playing with the mounds of paper that are left behind the marching bands.

In the evening, local band clubs play on a band stand adjacent to the parish church. Locals and visitors walk back and forth along the main street under colourful lights and banners. The streets are lined with statues of saints and angels. The procession leaves the church early in the evening and winds its way around the city. The fiesta ends with a spectacular run up the stairs of the Parish Church. Volunteers carrying the statue of the Patron Saint take a "ġirja" (run) up the stairs under the watchful eyes of parishioners, visitors and tourists. This traditional ending of the boisterous local feast dates back to 1898. The run is usually accompanied by an equally spectacular and noisy fire works display and loud cheers and clapping from the crowds. For a brief period, there was the possibility of this tradition being abolished, after the statue almost fell onto the crowd. It was however confirmed by the Diocese of Malta curia, on 1 June 2014, that the tradition should remain.

On 7 January 2018, the town celebrated a 500-year St. Cajetan anniversary.

In addition to the feast of St. Cajetan, Hamrun observes the feast of the Immaculate Conception on the first Sunday of July and on December 8. The titular statue of the Immaculate Conception is notable for receiving recognition from Pope Leo XIII, who granted an indulgence to individuals expressing devotion to it.

The feast of the Immaculate Conception is quite different from that of St Cajetan. Rather than focusing on the external more energetic and lively side of the feast, it is a feast which is much more muted and the parish's only band club guarantees a total absence of rivalry.

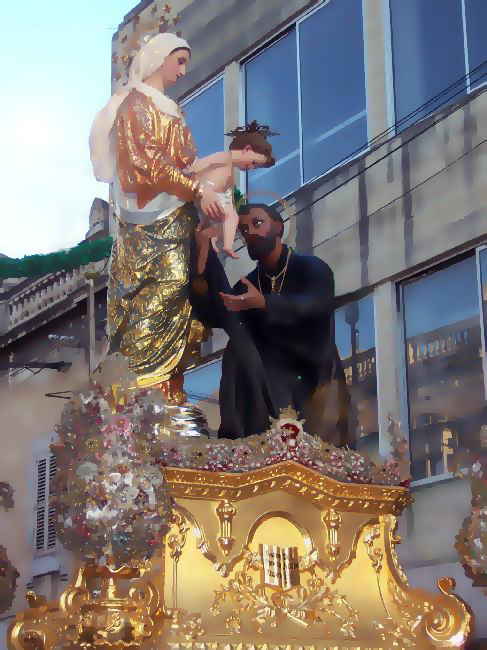
Procession with the Statue of St Gajetan

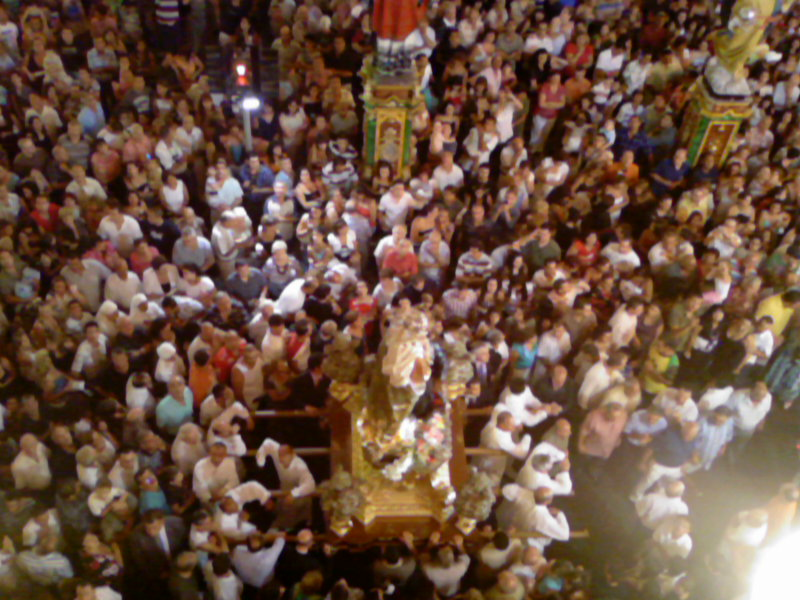
Procession with the Statue of St Gajetan

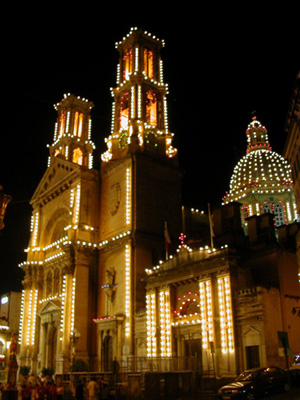
Sanctuary lit up for Festa

=== Religious organization ===
- Mixja Neokatekumenali, Kuncizzjoni Hamrun

==== Band clubs ====
- Għaqda Mużikali San Gejtanu (Saint Gaetan's Band Club)
- Socjeta Mużikali San Ġużepp (Saint Joseph's Band Club)
- Għaqda Mużikali Kunċizzjoni (Immaculate Conception Band Club)

==== Social clubs ====
- Hamrun Liberty
- Civic Club
- Hobbies Society

=== Scouts ===
Since 1908 when the Scout Movement was introduced in Malta, it has been said that the 1st Hamrun Scout Group was one of the pioneers of scouting in this country. However, it was only in 1913 that the Hamrun Group was recognized officially thanks to the diligence and dedication of the founder of the group, Mr. Edgar Delia and Mr. A.E. Vicari, the first Scoutmaster.

The group's motto is Forward Hamrun.

One can find documents that when Mr. Delia, together with other Maltese scouts participated for the first Scout Rally in Windsor Great Park in 1911, where he was given a bugle from Camp Commandant Lt. Col. Minden Cole. This bugle was the inspiration for the formation of the bugle and fife band within this group.

During World War I, the Hamrun Group served the country by helping in doing air-raid demonstrations and doing coast-guard watching around the island. After the War, the group grew so much that towards the end of the 1950s it was thought that bigger headquarters would be needed. It was only in 1968 that the Hamrun Group officially inaugurated the old train station as the new headquarters. In the same year, the group was honoured by the coat of arms of the Duke of Argyll. From that day onwards, with the permission and approval of the Scout Association of Malta, the group was known as the 1st Hamrun Scout Group Duke of Argyll's Own.

This was a big step forward for the Hamrun Group, especially for its band, that now was honoured to wear the Clan Campbell tartan.

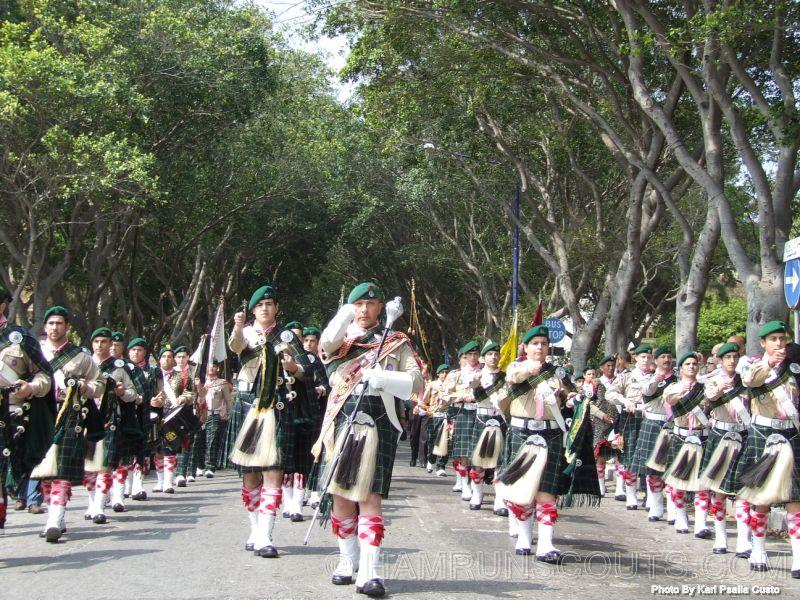
1st Hamrun Pipe Band

=== Sports ===
Hamrun is home to the Ħamrun Spartans and Ħamrun Sporting football clubs. Hamrun houses Victor Tedesco Stadium, a stadium used for premier league fixtures.

Two other important teams include the Hamrun Liberty who play basketball, and Hamrun Kavallieri playing rugby.

== Transport ==
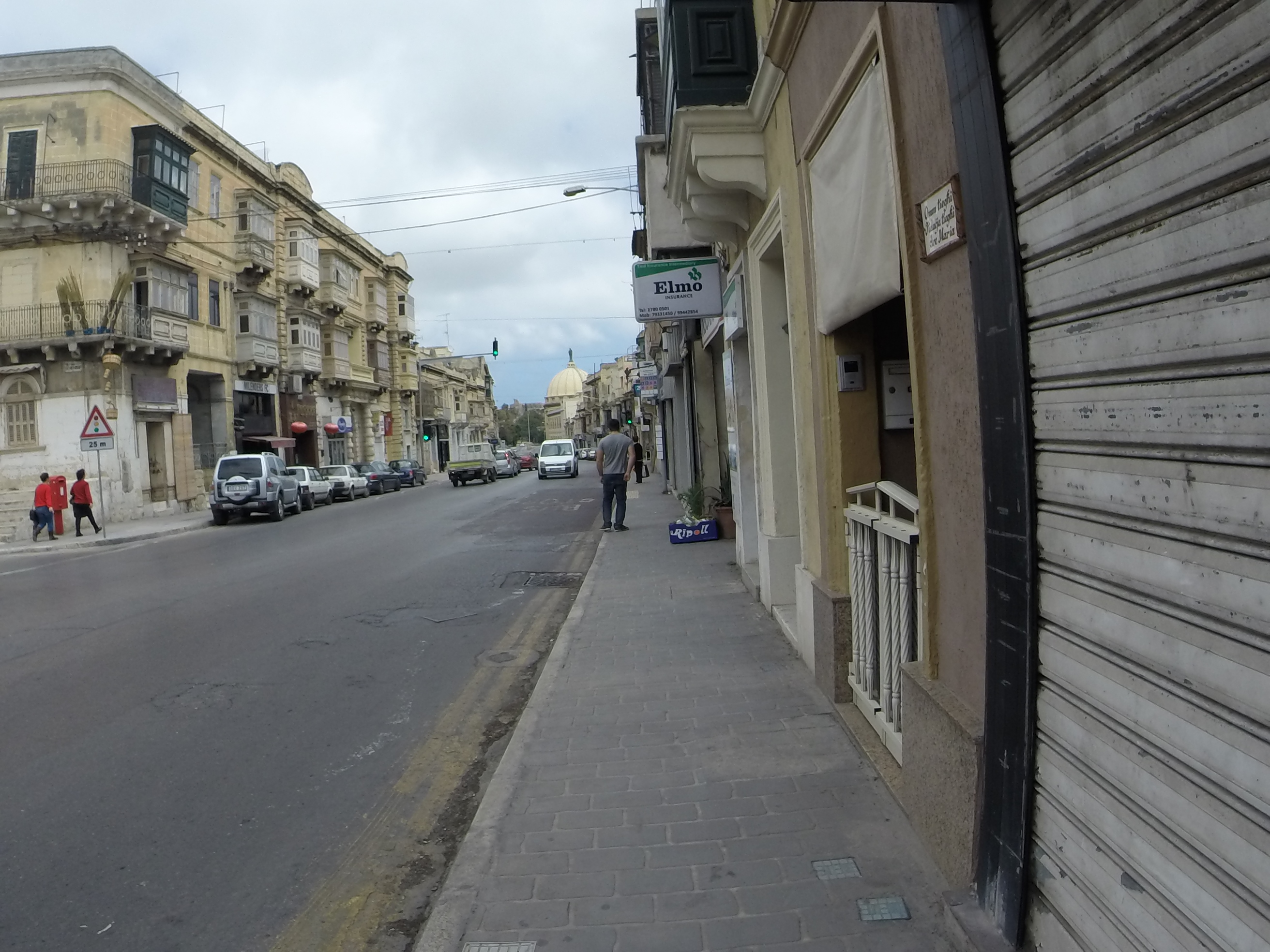
St Joseph High Road

Several historic transport services used to pass through Hamrun, including the Malta Railway, known in Maltese as il-vapur tal-art. The former train station is now used as the headquarters for the Hamrun Scout group which is one of the oldest scout groups in the world. Another transport service which used to pass through the town was that of the Tram.

St. Joseph High Road (Maltese: Triq il-Kbira San Ġużepp) is the main street of Hamrun and one of the most important commercial areas of Malta.

== Schools ==
Hamrun has the largest concentration of schools in Malta. The oldest schools of Hamrun are the Government Primary Schools. These schools cater for students from the age of 3 to 11 years. The older primary school dates back to the mid-18th century. The doorways of the school are adorned by busts of Queen Victoria and Prince Albert. The other primary school was built in the early 1920s.

Maria Regina Girls' Junior Lyceum is a large girl's Junior Lyceum built in the late 1950s.

Dun Guzepp Zammit Brighella Boys' Junior Lyceum traces its origins in the 1590s. The coat of arms of the school still bears part of the coat of arms of the Bishop Garagallo who was Bishop of Malta. Originally the lyceum was found in Valletta. The current building was built in the early 1950s.

Maria Assunta Girls' Secondary School is one of the largest schools in Malta. This school was built in the 1960s with the help of UNESCO.

Adelaide Cini Girls' School was another girls school in Hamrun. It was closed down just a few years ago. Today the same building houses the temporary location for students who eventually will go to M.A. Vassalli Boys' Junior Lyceum.

Maria Teresa Nuzzo Girls' School was a school which used to cater for the low ability female students aged between 11 and 16 years. This school was located in the same premises of the Primary School built in the 1920s. The student population was around 100. This school was closed down in 2005.

Our Lady Immaculate Girls' School is a church school which cater for from the age of 4 to 16. This school is managed by Franciscan Sisters. In this school there are almost 700 children.

St. Joseph's Girls School is a church school which caters for students from the age of 4 to 16.

== Zones in Hamrun ==
- San Gejtanu
- Tas-Samra (Our Lady of Atocia district)
- Tar-Rabbat
- Tad-Duluri (Our Lady of Sorrows district)
- Il-Kunċizzjoni (Immaculate Conception district)
- Il-Blata l-Bajda (White Rock)
- Ta' Braxia

== Twin towns – sister cities ==
Hamrun is twinned with:

- Scilla, Italy
- Carpineto Romano, Italy
