= List of people on the postage stamps of Malta =

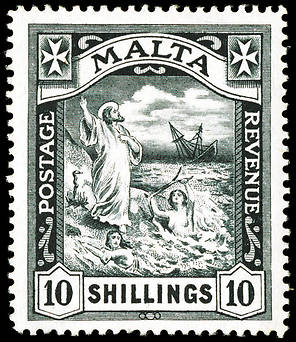
Saint Paul on a 1919 stamp of Malta

This article lists people who have been featured on Malta postage stamps, listed by their name, the year they were first featured on a stamp, and a short description of their notability. Several of these people have been featured on multiple stamps.

For the purpose of this list, "featured" may mean:

1. The likeness of a person,
2. The name of a person, or
3. People who have neither their likeness nor name on a stamp, but are documented by MaltaPost as being the subject of a stamp.

== A ==
- Veneranda Abela – Maltese baroness (1998)
- Giovanni Francesco Abela – Maltese historian (2005)
- Karmenu Abela – Maltese Sette Giugno victim (1985)
- Agatha of Sicily – Christian saint (1965)
- Carmela Agius – Maltese laundress (2003)
- Hans Christian Andersen – Danish author (2005)
- Andrew the Apostle – Christian saint (2019)
- Anthony of Antioch – Christian saint (1998)
- Manwel Attard – Maltese Sette Giugno victim (1985)
- Emmanuel Attard Bezzina – Maltese politician (1975)
- Francesco Azzopardi – Maltese composer (1985)
- Michael Azzopardi – Maltese philanthropist (2005)

== B ==
- Robert Baden-Powell – British military officer, founder of scouting (2007)
- Alexander Ball – British naval officer, Civil Commissioner of Malta (1999)
- Ġużeppi Bajada – Maltese Sette Giugno victim (1985)
- Nicolo Baldacchino – Maltese tenor (1985)
- Giuseppe Barth – Maltese-Austrian ophthalmologist (1974)
- Bartholomew the Apostle – Christian saint (2021)
- Franz Beckenbauer – German footballer and coach (2006)
- Laurie Bellizzi – Maltese entertainer (2019)
- Benedict XVI – German Pope (2010)
- Ludwig van Beethoven – German composer and pianist (2020)
- Diego Bonanno – Maltese priest and philanthropist (1986)
- Napoleon Bonaparte – French military and political leader (1998)
- Francis Bonnici – Maltese priest and philanthropist (2007)
- Joe Borg – Maltese Foreign Minister (2004)
- John Borg – Maltese botanist (1974)
- George Borg Olivier – Prime Minister of Malta (1989)
- John Bosco – Italian priest, Christian saint (2004)
- Rużar Briffa – Maltese poet (1980)
- David Bruce – Australian-British pathologist and microbiologist (1966)
- Vincenzo Bugeja – Maltese businessman and philanthropist (1986)
- George H. W. Bush – President of the United States (1989)
- Anton Buttigieg – President of Malta (1974)
- Lord Byron – English poet (1990)

== C ==
- Giuseppe Calì – Maltese painter (1996)
- Joseph Calleia – Maltese-American actor and singer (1997)
- Nazzareno Camilleri – Maltese philosopher (1996)
- Gregorio Carafa – Hospitaller Grand Master (2014)
- Girolamo Cassar – Maltese architect and military engineer (1966)
- Saverio Cassar – Maltese priest, Governor of Gozo (2002)
- Jean de la Cassière – Hospitaller Grand Master (2014)
- Johnny Catania – Maltese entertainer (2019)
- Catherine of Alexandria – Christian saint (2005)
- Catherine of Siena – Christian saint (1967)
- Caroline Cauchi – Maltese philanthropist (2007)
- Pietru Caxaro – Maltese philosopher and poet (1985)
- Bobby Charlton – English footballer (2006)
- Christopher – Christian saint (1976)
- Winston Churchill – Prime Minister of the United Kingdom (1966)
- Adelaide Cini – Maltese philanthropist (1986)
- Annet de Clermont-Gessant – Hospitaller Grand Master (2014)
- Charles Clews – Maltese entertainer (2019)
- Samuel Taylor Coleridge – English poet, literary critic, philosopher, and theologian (1990)
- Christopher Columbus – Italian explorer (1992)
- Nicolas Cotoner – Hospitaller Grand Master (1964)
- Raphael Cotoner – Hospitaller Grand Master (2014)
- Jacques Cousteau – French diver (1997)
- Anastasio Cuschieri – Maltese priest and poet (1988)

== D ==
- Dante Alighieri – Italian poet (1965)
- Giuseppe De Piro – Maltese missionary (1983)
- Ramon Despuig – Hospitaller Grand Master (2014)
- Carlo Diacono – Maltese composer (2006)
- Adrian Dingli – Chief Justice of Malta (2002)
- Dominic – Castilian priest, Christian saint (2018)
- Henry Dunant – Swiss humanitarian, businessman and activist, founder of the Red Cross (2013)
- Wenzu Dyer – Maltese Sette Giugno victim (1985)

== E ==
- Edward VII – British monarch (1903)
- Dwight D. Eisenhower – American general, President of the United States (2018)
- Elizabeth – Biblical figure (2021)
- Elizabeth – British queen consort (1937)
- Elizabeth II – British monarch (1950)

== F ==
- Nazju Falzon – Maltese cleric (1988)
- Eddie Fenech Adami – President of Malta (2004)
- Sidor Formosa – Maltese priest (1988)
- Francis – Argentine Pope (2022)
- Francis of Assisi – Italian priest, Christian saint (1986)

== G ==
- Gaetano dei Conti di Thiene – Italian priest and reformer, Christian saint (2018)
- Alfons Maria Galea – Maltese writer (1986)
- Galileo Galilei – Italian astronomer, physicist and engineer (2009)
- Mohandas Karamchand Gandhi – Indian independence leader (1969)
- Tomás Gargallo – Spanish Bishop of Malta, education pioneer (1997)
- Martin Garzez – Hospitaller Grand Master (2014)
- Bob Geldof – Irish singer-songwriter, actor and activist (2006)
- George – Christian saint (2003)
- George V – British monarch (1914)
- George VI – British monarch (1937)
- Gerard – founder of the Knights Hospitaller (2013)
- Nosi Ghirlando – Maltese entertainer (2019)
- Mikhail Gorbachev – Soviet leader (1989)
- Lord Gort – Governor of Malta (1993)
- Gregory – Christian saint (1998)
- Maria Amelia Grognet – Maltese noblewoman (1998)
- Robert Guiscard – Norman adventurer and warrior (2009)

== H ==
- Holofernes – Biblical figure (1975)
- Juan de Homedes y Coscon – Hospitaller Grand Master (2014)
- Ferdinand von Hompesch zu Bolheim – Hospitaller Grand Master (1998)

== I ==
- Ignatius of Loyola – Spanish priest and theologian, Christian saint (1991)
- Nicolas Isouard – Maltese-French composer (1971)

== J ==
- Jerome – Christian saint (1970)
- Jesus (1951)
- John the Baptist – Christian saint (1967)
- John of the Cross – Spanish priest, Christian saint (1991)
- John XXIII – Italian Pope, Christian saint (2014)
- John Paul II – Polish Pope, Christian saint (1990)
- Elton John – British singer, pianist and composer (2003)
- Joseph – Christian saint (1964)
- Judith – Biblical figure (1975)
- Julian the Hospitaller – Christian saint (2018)

== K ==
- John F. Kennedy – President of the United States (1966)
- Athanasius Kircher – German scholar and polymath (2002)
- Oreste Kirkop – Maltese tenor (2002)

== L ==
- Philippe Villiers de L'Isle-Adam – Hospitaller Grand Master (1938)
- Albert Laferla – Maltese education pioneer (1997)
- Francesco Laparelli – Italian architect and military engineer (1966)
- Egidio Lapira – Maltese dentist (2005)
- Giovanni Paolo Lascaris – Hospitaller Grand Master (2014)
- Lawrence – Christian saint (2019)
- William D. Leahy – American naval officer (2015)

== M ==
- The Magi – Biblical figures (1965)
- Manuel Magri – Maltese ethnographer, archaeologist and writer (2007)
- Anthony Mamo – President of Malta (1974)
- Guglielmo Marconi – Italian inventor (1996)
- Mary (1951)
- Michael – archangel (1976)
- Dom Mintoff – Prime Minister of Malta (1974)
- Giorgio Mitrovich – Maltese activist (1985)
- Pierre de Monte – Hospitaller Grand Master (2014)
- Wolfgang Amadeus Mozart – German composer (2006)

== N ==
- Paul Nani – Maltese composer (2006)
- Johnny Navarro – Maltese entertainer (2019)
- Nicholas – Christian saint (1976)

== O ==
- Walter Oxley – British military officer (2018)

== P ==
- Carmelo Pace – Maltese composer (2006)
- Arvid Pardo – Maltese-Swedish diplomat and scholar (1987)
- Louis Pasteur – French chemist and microbiologist (1995)
- Paul the Apostle – Christian saint (1899)
- Antoine de Paule – Hospitaller Grand Master (2014)
- Pelé – Brazilian footballer (2006)
- Mary Euphrasia Pelletier – French nun, Christian saint (1996)
- Ramon Perellos y Roccaful – Hospitaller Grand Master (2014)
- Peter – Christian saint (1967)
- Philip – British prince, Duke of Edinburgh (2003)
- Philip of Agira – Christian saint (2019)
- Manuel Pinto da Fonseca – Hospitaller Grand Master (1969)
- Padre Pio – Italian friar and mystic, Christian saint (2018)
- Maria Adeodata Pisani – Maltese nun (1991)
- Pius V – Italian Pope, Christian saint (1966)
- Piero de Ponte – Hospitaller Grand Master (2014)
- George Preca – Maltese priest, Christian saint (1980)
- Mattia Preti – Italian artist (2013)
- Luigi Preziosi – Maltese politician and ophthalmologist (1988)
- Karm Psaila – Maltese priest and poet (1971)
- Publius – Christian saint (1926)
- Paolo Pullicino – Maltese priest and education pioneer (1997)

== R ==
- Raphael – archangel (1998)
- Martin de Redin – Hospitaller Grand Master (2014)
- Roger I – Norman Count of Sicily (2009)
- Emmanuel de Rohan-Polduc – Hospitaller Grand Master (2014)
- Franklin D. Roosevelt – President of the United States (2015)

== S ==
- Didier de Saint-Jaille – Hospitaller Grand Master (2014)
- Robert Samut – Maltese doctor and musician (1969)
- Michelangelo Sapiano – Maltese clockmaker (1995)
- Pietru Pawl Saydon – Maltese priest, scholar and Bible translator (1988)
- Antonio Sciortino – Maltese sculptor (1971)
- Walter Scott – Scottish writer and historian (1990)
- Claude de la Sengle – Hospitaller Grand Master (2014)
- Inez Soler – Maltese artist, musician and writer (1996)
- Joseph Stalin – Soviet leader (2015)
- Heinrich von Stephan – German postal reformer (1974)
- Sting – English musician, singer-songwriter and actor (2006)
- Mabel Strickland – Anglo-Maltese journalist, newspaper proprietor and politician (1996)

== T ==
- Franz von Taxis – Italian postal reformer (2020)
- Arthur Tedder – British military officer (2018)
- William Makepeace Thackeray – British novelist, author and illustrator (1990)
- Thomas of Villanova – Spanish friar, Christian saint (1967)

== U ==
- Armando Urso – Maltese entertainer (2019)

== V ==
- Jean Parisot de Valette – Hospitaller Grand Master (1962)
- Luís Mendes de Vasconcellos – Hospitaller Grand Master (2014)
- Mikiel Anton Vassalli – Maltese writer, philosopher and linguist (1980)
- Paolino Vassallo – Maltese composer (2006)
- Claude-Henri Belgrand de Vaubois – French general (1999)
- Venera – Christian saint (2019)
- Hugues Loubenx de Verdalle – Hospitaller Grand Master (2014)
- Emily de Vialar – French nun and education pioneer (1997)
- Victoria – British monarch (1860)
- António Manoel de Vilhena – Hospitaller Grand Master (2014)
- Emmanuele Vitale – Maltese rebel leader, Governor of Gozo (2002)

== W ==
- Adrien de Wignacourt – Hospitaller Grand Master (2014)
- Alof de Wignacourt – Hospitaller Grand Master (2014)

== X ==
- Mikiel Xerri – Maltese patriot (1999)
- Francisco Ximénez de Tejada – Hospitaller Grand Master (2014)

== Z ==
- Giuseppe Zammit – Maltese professor (1976)
- Themistocles Zammit – Maltese doctor and archaeologist (1966)
- Dino Zoff – Italian goalkeeper (2006)
- Marc'Antonio Zondadari – Hospitaller Grand Master (2014)

== People commemorated but not depicted on Malta stamps ==
- Geronimo Abos – Maltese composer (2005)
- Henry Mayo Bateman – British artist and cartoonist (2012)
- Giuseppe Callus (2005)
- Albrecht Dürer – German painter, printmaker, and theorist (1978)
- Melchiorre Gafà – Maltese sculptor (1967)
- Edward Lear – English artist, illustrator, musician, author and poet (2012)
- Giovanni Pietro Francesco Agius de Soldanis – Maltese historian (1971)

== See also ==
- Stamp collecting
- Philately
- List of philatelic bureaus
