= List of monuments in Santa Venera =

This is a list of monuments in Santa Venera, Malta, which are listed on the National Inventory of the Cultural Property of the Maltese Islands.

== List ==
| Name of object | Location | Coordinates | ID | Photo | Upload |
|---|---|---|---|---|---|
| Statue of St Roque | Triq Misraħ il-Barrieri c/w Triq l-4 ta' Settembru 1918 | 35°53′27″N 14°29′02″E | 00186 | Statue of St Roque | Upload Photo |
| Statue of St Paul (removed) | 23 Triq L-Imsida | 35°53′22″N 14°28′43″E | 00187 | Statue of St Paul (removed) | Upload Photo |
| Niche of St Joseph | 465 Triq il-Kbira San Ġużepp c/w Triq San Pawl | 35°53′24″N 14°28′30″E | 00188 | Niche of St Joseph | Upload Photo |
| Niche of St Paul | 8 Triq San Pawl | 35°53′25″N 14°28′30″E | 00189 | Niche of St Paul | Upload Photo |
| Relief of Our Lady of Mount Carmel | 4 Triq Braille | 35°53′24″N 14°28′31″E | 00190 | Relief of Our Lady of Mount Carmel | Upload Photo |
| Niche of Our Lady of Mount Carmel | 6 Misraħ Santa Venera | 35°53′30″N 14°28′41″E | 00191 | Niche of Our Lady of Mount Carmel | Upload Photo |
| Niche Immaculate Conception | Triq il-Kanun | 35°53′11″N 14°28′44″E | 00192 | Niche Immaculate Conception | Upload Photo |
| Statue of Christ the Saviour | 302 Triq il-Kbira San Ġużepp c/w Triq il-Kanun | 35°53′15″N 14°28′58″E | 00193 | Statue of Christ the Saviour | Upload Photo |
| Statue of Our Lady of Mount Carmel | 557 Triq il-Kbira San Ġużepp c/w Triq il-Kardinal Xiberras | 35°53′16″N 14°28′57″E | 00194 | Statue of Our Lady of Mount Carmel | Upload Photo |
| Statue of the Sacred Heart of Jesus | 523 Triq il-Kbira San Ġużepp c/w 1 Triq il-Qalb Imqaddsa | 35°53′17″N 14°28′52″E | 00195 | Statue of the Sacred Heart of Jesus | Upload Photo |
| Niche St George | 42 Triq San Ġorġ c/w Triq Brigħella | 35°53′20″N 14°28′56″E | 00196 | Niche St George | Upload Photo |
| Niche St Joseph | 11/12 Triq San Ġorġ | 35°53′15″N 14°28′54″E | 00197 | Niche St Joseph | Upload Photo |
| Parish Church of Santa Venera | Triq il-Kbira San Ġużepp c/w Triq il-Parroċċa | 35°53′17″N 14°28′48″E | 00198 | Parish Church of Santa Venera | Upload Photo |
| Old Church of Santa Venera | Misraħ Santa Venera | 35°50′18″N 14°28′59″E | 00199 | Old Church of Santa Venera | Upload Photo |
| Palazzo Manuel | Triq il-Kbira San Ġużepp | 35°53′22″N 14°28′38″E | 01226 | Palazzo Manuel | Upload Photo |
| Conservatorio Vincenzo Bugeja | Triq il-Kbira San Ġużepp c/w Triq Fleur-De-Lys | 35°53′26″N 14°28′25″E | 01227 | Conservatorio Vincenzo Bugeja | Upload Photo |
| Istituto Technico Vincenzo Bugeja | Triq il-Kbira San Ġużepp | 35°53′23″N 14°28′35″E | 01228 | Istituto Technico Vincenzo Bugeja | Upload Photo |
| Wignacourt Aqueduct | Triq il-Kbira San Ġużepp (between Triq Ħal Qormi and Triq il-Kanun) | 35°53′22″N 14°28′33″E | 01229 | Wignacourt Aqueduct | Upload Photo |
