= Alessandro Curmi =

Maltese composer

Alessandro Curmi (17 October 1801 – April 1857) was a Maltese composer and pianist. Born in Valletta, he studied privately with Pietro Paolo Bugeja and then under Niccolò Antonio Zingarelli and Giacomo Tritto at the San Pietro a Maiella Conservatory in Naples from 1821 to 1827. He later became a member of Bologna's Accademia Filarmonica.

As a composer Curmi was primarily focused on writing operas. His first opera, Gustavo d'Orxa, was received enthusiastically at the Teatro Nuovo in Naples in 1827. His greatest success, Elodia di Herstall, came at the Teatro di San Carlo in 1842. According to Curmi's personal friend and fellow composer Paolino Vassallo, Curmi was invited to London to compose three operas for the Royal Opera, London while on a brief visit to Paris (where he wrote the cantata Sancte Paule) in 1843. The three operas, La rosièr, La reine des fées, and Lodoïska were all performed there in 1844.

Curmi returned to Paris in the winter of 1845 with the intent of composing a grand opera. However, these plans never came to fruition because of the political situation in France. Instead Curmi composed the orchestral fantasia in six sections, La rivoluzione, which was also heard in Malta in 1853. He died in Naples in 1857.

== Sources ==
- Joseph Vella Bondin. "Curmi [Curmy], Alessandro", Grove Dictionary of Music and Musicians.
