= Office for Fair Trading (Malta) =

Office for Fair Trading (Malta) brings together the official and independent authorities responsible for the enforcement of the national and European Union legislation on trade competition as well as on consumer protection in Malta. As such, its scope is wider than the nearly homonymous official bodies like the Office of Fair Trading of the United Kingdom and of the states of Australia, which are almost exclusively focused on competition matters, a task undertaken more specifically in Malta by units within the frame of the Office through the Consumer and Competition Division; the Office for Fair Competition and the Commission for Fair Trading. Its director, the Director for Fair Competition, has wide investigatory powers facilitating the collection of evidence. The premises of the Maltese Office for Fair Trading are based in Santa Venera.

The Office's Consumer and Competition Division is one of the entities that emerged from the remit of the former Ministry for Competitiveness and Communications following an operations review carried out in 2000.

== Competition law enforcement ==
Maltese law has no express provisions dealing specifically with actions for damages for breaches of competition law and there are no specialised Courts that deal with actions for damages consequent to a breach. However, a party who suffers damages consequent to a breach of EC and/or national competition law may rely on the general provisions of the Maltese Civil Code dealing with the concept of damages and therefore the ordinary courts are competent. The Commission for Fair Trading may become involved in the proceedings and the question whether there has been an abuse of a dominant position by an undertaking or whether an agreement is null and unenforceable must be referred to the Commission for Fair Trading.

== Consumer law enforcement ==
The most widely used means of consumer redress in Malta is the out-of-court procedure through the Department of Consumer Affairs within the Consumer and Competition Division. The scheme serves both as an information relay on particular consumer matters and in issues concerning the purchase of goods or services, it also acts as an out-of-court redress procedure. Another out-of-court consumer redress scheme is operated by the Malta Financial Services Authority, dealing specifically with financial services through the Consumer Complaints Manager.

There are also two in-court simplified mechanisms, which can be used by consumers in solving business-to-consumer disputes, but only one of these has been specifically designed for the purpose. These are the Small Claims Tribunal and the Consumer Claims Tribunal, the latter being the one specifically designed for resolving consumer disputes.

== Controversies ==
The Office's anti-cartel policy and its effectiveness is a widely debated topic in Malta as it became apparent during a recent investigation on and the controversies surrounding the conditions of liberalization in the market for school uniforms.
