= Santa Venera Parish Church =

- Knisja Parrokkjali ta' Santa Venera
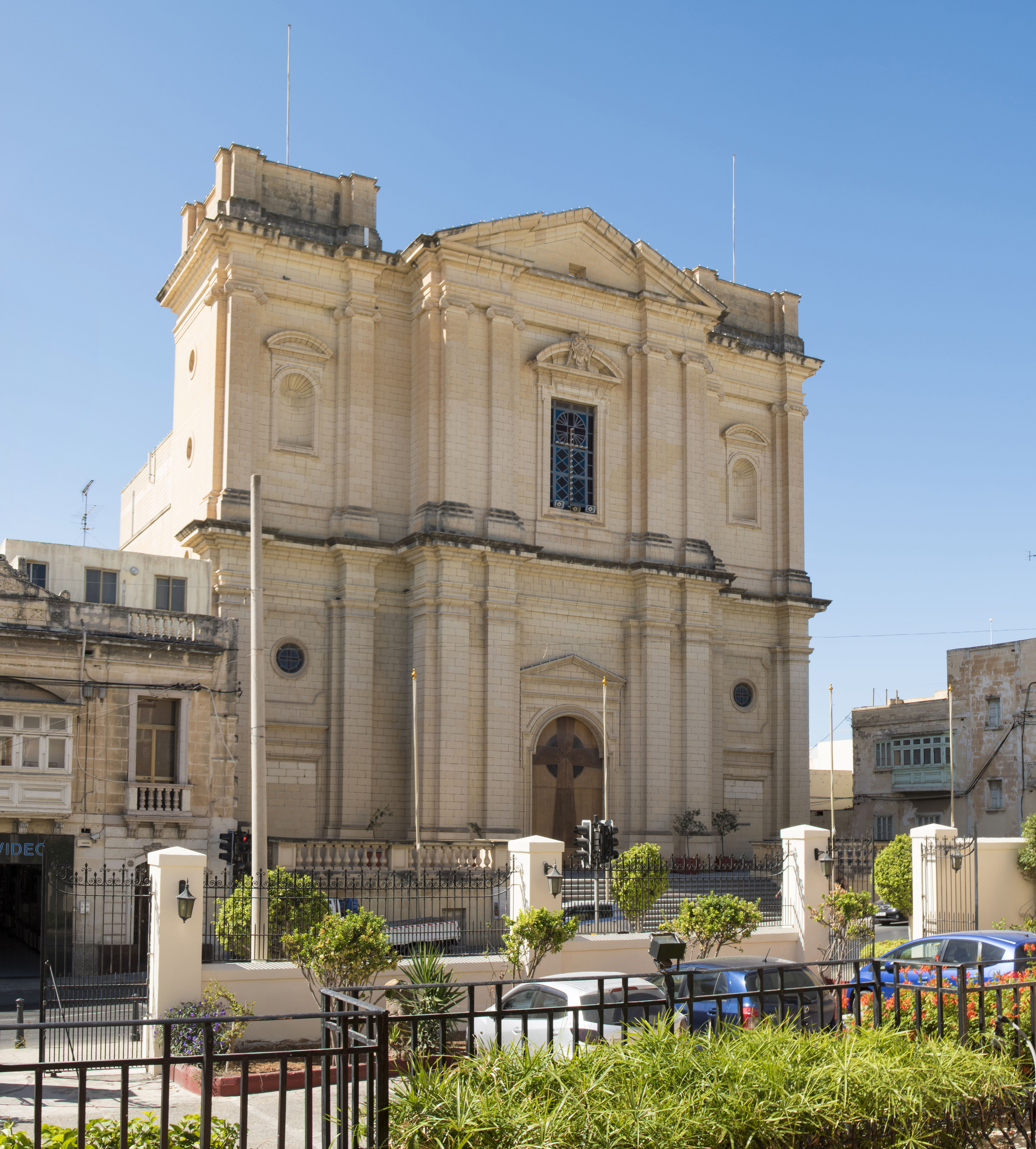
- The church's façade in 2017
- Santa Venera Parish Church
- 35°53′16.9″N 14°28′47.9″E
- Location: Santa Venera
- Country: Malta
- Denomination: Roman Catholic
- Religious order: Carmelites
- Website: parroccasantavenera.org

History
- Status: Parish church
- Dedication: Saint Venera

Architecture
- Functional status: Active
- Architect(s): Ġużè Damato; Ġużeppi Galea
- Style: Romanesque Revival and Baroque
- Years built: 1954–2005

Specifications
- Materials: Limestone and concrete

Administration
- Archdiocese: Malta

The Santa Venera Parish Church (Maltese: Knisja Parrokkjali ta' Santa Venera) is a Roman Catholic parish church in Santa Venera, Malta, dedicated to saint of the same name. It was constructed at various stages between 1954 and 2005, although the building is still incomplete, lacking bell towers.

== History ==
The settlement of Santa Venera grew rapidly in the 20th century, and the old parish church became too small to cater for the needs of the inhabitants. Construction of the church began on 19 April 1956, to Romanesque Revival designs of Ġużè Damato. After excavation works, the roofing and the balcony were completed by June 1967. Construction stopped due to a lack of funds, but on 19 March 1969 the crypt under the new church, which had been completed, began to be used as a temporary church. A separate community was established in 1980, and the incomplete building became the parish church on 3 December 1989.

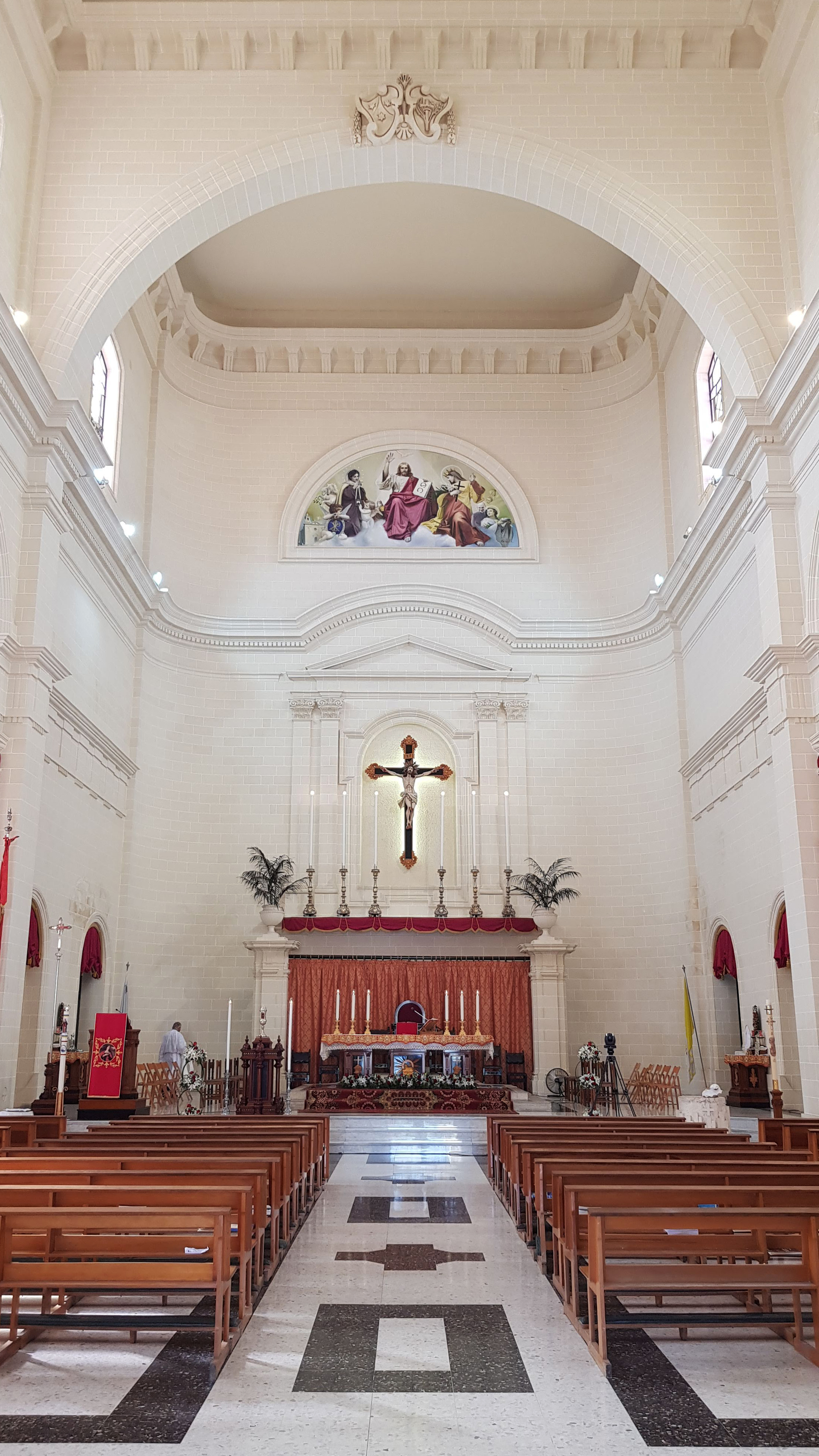
The church's interior

After Damato's death, the architect Louis A. Naudi was commissioned to continue works, and he was later joined by Godwin Aquilina. The original plan with five altars was deemed unsuitable due to the Second Vatican Council, so it was redesigned by Ġużeppi Galea. The foundation stone was laid on 6 October 1990. Works progressed more rapidly, and the building was opened and blessed by Archbishop Joseph Mercieca on 17 July 2005. The church is still incomplete, missing its bell towers, and it is not yet consecrated.

The church building is listed on the National Inventory of the Cultural Property of the Maltese Islands.

== Architecture ==
The church is constructed out of limestone and concrete, with the main structure consisting of two-leaf stone walls, with the cavity in between being filled with concrete. The roof is built using pre-fabricated concrete planks.
