= Josie Mallia Pulvirenti =

Maltese composer

Josie Mallia Pulvirenti (6 July 1896 – 8 September 1964) was a Maltese composer. Born in Valletta, he studied in Malta with Paolino Vassallo, and in Milan with the Italian composer-organist Giulio Bas, who influenced him politically. He composed in his spare time while running the family business.

Mallia Pulvirenti produced some large scale orchestral works at a time when Maltese music was mostly insular and church music was dominant. His music was clearly influenced by the impressionistic style emerging across broader Europe at the time. Impressione Sinfonica (1922) was scored for triple woodwind, four horns, three trumpets, three trombones, tuba, timpani, percussion (bass drum, cymbals, tam- tam, triangle), two harps and strings. It has been recorded in its orchestral form, and (in a piano transcription) by Charlene Farrugia. It was followed by the symphonic poem Impressionismo, premiered at the Theatre Royal matinée on 5 April 1924.

His other works include Elegie della Giovinezza Perduta (a cantata for soprano, choir and orchestra), Ballata Romantica for soloists, choir and orchestra, Lettera Africana (a monologue with chamber ensemble), and the operetta Il primo peccato. He was also the composer of the Inno Del Partito Nazionale (anthem of the National Party) for band in 1932.
