= Paraskevi of Rome =

Eastern Orthodox martyr and saint

Saint Paraskevi of Rome
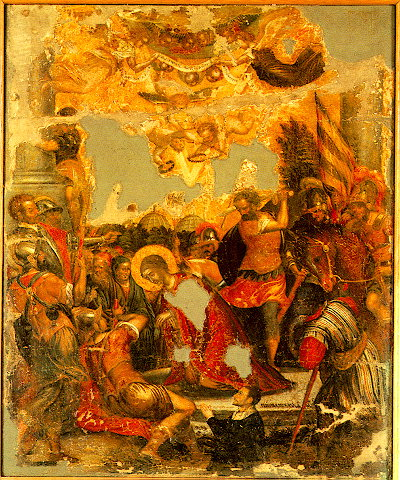
- The execution of St. Paraskevi. Icon by Michael Damaskenos, 16th century.

Martyr
- Born: c. 117–138; Rome
- Died: c. 180 AD
- Venerated in: Eastern Orthodox Church; Eastern Catholic Churches
- Feast: July 26
- Patronage: Healer of the blind

Saint Paraskevi of Rome (also Parasceva) is venerated as a Christian martyr of the 2nd century. She was arrested on multiple occasions for her Christianity and was eventually beheaded by the Roman governor Tarasius.

She is invoked for the healing of ailments of the eyes. The Church commemorates her on July 26.

The double of saint Saint Venera (Parasceve) who also is celebrated July 26.

== Life ==
=== Early life ===
Paraskevi was born in a village near Rome, likely during the reign of the Roman Emperor Hadrian (117–138 AD). Her parents, Agathon and Politia, were Christians of Greek origin, and had prayed for many years to have a child. Politia finally bore a child, a girl who was born on a Friday, the day of Our Lord's suffering. Her parents therefore named her Paraskevi (Παρασκευή), meaning "Friday" in Greek (literally "preparation (day)" for the sabbath: cf. Mark 15:42). Paraskevi grew up to be a devout and well-read woman, who rejected many suitors.

After the death of her parents, she gave away all of her possessions and began to preach the Christian faith. At the age of 30, Paraskevi left Rome and ministered to many towns and villages.

=== Persecution ===
In the village of Therapia, Constantinople, she was arrested by soldiers of Emperor Antoninus Pius, and brought to trial. The charge was blasphemy and her words were the cause of all the ills that had recently befallen the empire. Antoninus Pius attempted to convince Paraskevi to denounce her faith, and even offered to marry her. Paraskevi refused, and was beaten and tortured by having a steel helmet lined with nails placed on her head and tightened with a vice. No pain seemed to affect her, and her endurance caused many to convert to Christianity. Eventually, at his wit's end, Antoninus Pius demanded that Paraskevi be immersed into a large kettle of oil and tar. However, she emerged from even this unscathed. When she was accused of using magic, Paraskevi responded by throwing the liquid into the Emperor's face. He was blinded and desperately asked for her help. Antoninus Pius regained his sight. This miracle moved him to convert to Christianity and set Paraskevi free. He did not persecute Christians thereafter.

However, after the death of Antoninus Pius, the laws changed once again under Emperor Marcus Aurelius. A plague struck the Roman people (see Antonine Plague) and many, including Marcus Aurelius, considered Christians responsible for angering the gods. Paraskevi was arrested again in a city governed by a man named Asclepius, who threw her into a pit with a large snake. Paraskevi, however, made a Sign of the Cross and the snake fell dead. Just like with Antoninus Pius, Paraskevi's miracle converted Asclepius to Christianity, and he released Paraskevi. She continued to travel from city to city preaching the Faith.

=== Death ===
Finally, Paraskevi was arrested for the last time by a Roman official named Tarasius, and taken to the Temple of Apollo. Upon entering the Temple, Paraskevi made a Sign of the Cross, and all the idols in the Temple were destroyed. Instead of converting the onlookers to Christianity, however, they became enraged, and beat Paraskevi. Tarasius then had her beheaded.

==== Alternate death narratives ====
According to some Orthodox traditions, Asclepius and Tarasius arrested Paraskevi at the same time. While Asclepius was moved by her miracle in the snake pit and wanted to set her free, Tarasius was not convinced. He was then the one who sentenced her to death after she destroyed the idols in the Temple of Apollo.

== Veneration ==
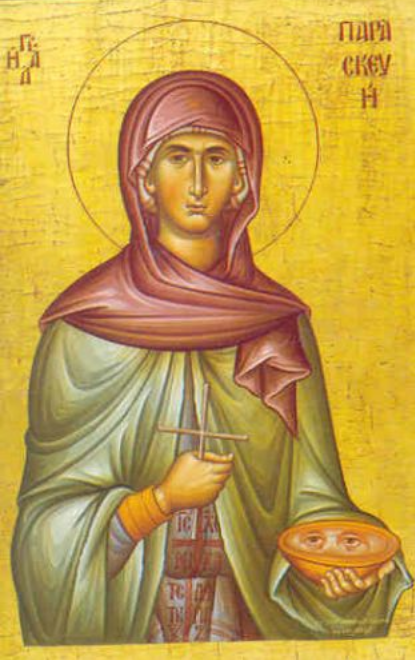
Venerated as the healer of the blind, Saint Paraskevi is often depicted with two eyeballs in her hands.

Saint Paraskevi is the most prominent among female healing saints, and she is widely venerated as the healer of the blind. For this reason, she is often depicted with two eyeballs in her hands.

Her remains were eventually taken to Constantinople. Though it is not certain when or how her relics reached Constantinople, it seems that they were exhibited there c. 1200 to be accessible to pilgrims.

Saint Paraskevi is commemorated on July 26 by the Church. Her celebration is preceded by a Matins service and is celebrated with the Divine Liturgy of Saint John Chrysotom, held on the morning of the feast.

=== Scripture readings ===
At the Divine Liturgy: Galatians 3:23–4:5; Mark 5:24–34.

=== Hymns ===
==== Apolytikion ====
The Apolytikion (Greek: Ἀπολυτίκιον) or Dismissal Hymn is a closing hymn that varies from day to day according to the calendar, and is sung in Eastern Orthodox Church services at the end of offices (such as Matins or Vespers).

First Tone Appropriate to your calling, O Champion Paraskevi, you worshipped with the readiness your name bears. For an abode you obtained faith, which is your namesake. Wherefore, you pour forth healing and intercede for our souls.

==== Kontakion ====
The Kontakion (Greek: κοντάκιον) is a hymn sung in Eastern Orthodox Church services, functioning as a poetic sermon. Thus, they were originally very extended and featured many stanzas–being so long that the text had to be wrapped around a pole for use in the service. This explains the origin of the name kontakion, derived from the Greek κόνταξ (kontax), which means 'rod' or 'stick' and refers specifically to the pole around which a scroll is wound. In modern practice, the kontakion is greatly abbreviated.

Plagal of the Fourth Tone O most majestic One, we have discovered your temple to be a spiritual clinic wherein all the faithful resoundingly honor you, O famed and venerable martyr Paraskevi.

== Legends ==
"According to the tradition of the people of Epirus, Paraskevi was not martyred in Rome as mentioned in her traditional hagiography, but in Thesprotia where the Monastery of Saint Paraskevi of Pounta stands today. According to this tradition, strongly held by the locals, the headless body of the saint was entombed here and her tomb is still venerated today. It is said that the persecutors of St. Paraskevi dragged her to the edge of the river Acheron to behead her. As the sword was raised over her head, she grabbed a stone pillar that she held so tightly that the print of her hands melted into it leaving an indelible mark. A church was eventually erected here by the faithful in her honor and housed her holy relics. Her skull was eventually placed in the walls of the church, though today it is kept in Moni Petraki in Athens."

Pilgrims would cut off portions of the stone pillar that Paraskevi held onto as a talisman, to the point that in 1960 the size of the stone was half its original size.

It is said in Orthodox tradition that St. Paraskevi's miracles endure beyond her death. At her tomb, the blind have regained sight, barren women have become pregnant, and the lame have walked. The dirt of her grave is said to hold great power.
