= Casa Leoni =

- Dar l-Iljuni
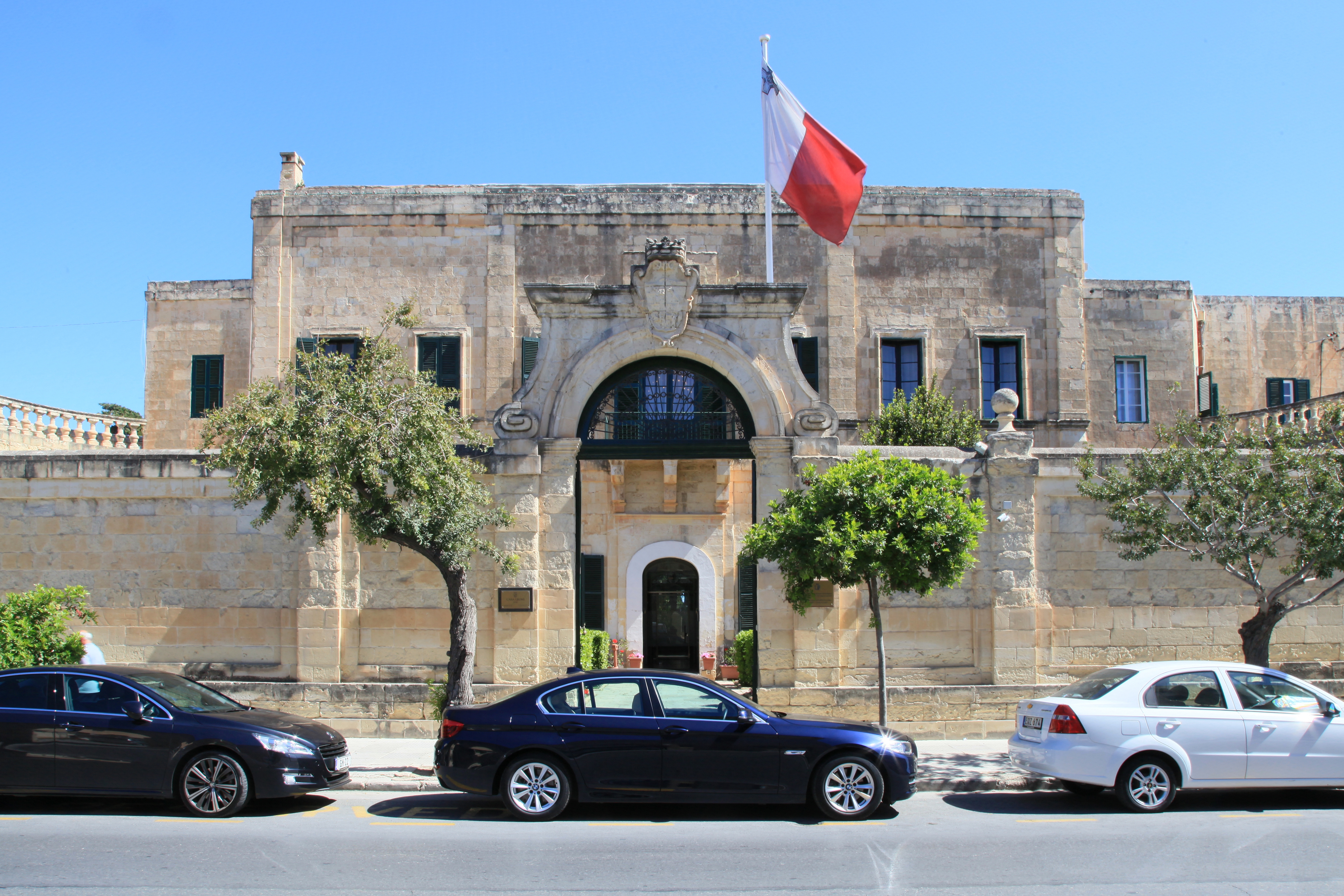
- Façade of Casa Leoni
- Interactive map of the Casa Leoni area
- Alternative names: Casa Leone; Palazzo Manoel; Vilhena Palace

General information
- Status: Intact
- Type: Palace
- Architectural style: Baroque
- Location: Santa Venera, Malta
- Coordinates: 35°53′21.8″N 14°28′37.9″E
- Current tenants: Ministry for Sustainable Mobility
- Completed: 1730 (Note: Some sources claim that it was built in 1732.)
- Owner: Government of Malta

Technical details
- Material: Limestone
- Floor count: 2

Casa Leoni or Casa Leone (Maltese: Dar l-Iljuni, meaning "House of the Lions"), also known as Palazzo Manoel or the Vilhena Palace (Maltese: Il-Palazz Vilhena), is a palace in Santa Venera, Malta, which was built as a summer residence for Grand Master António Manoel de Vilhena in 1730. It was subsequently used for a number of purposes, including as an insurgent command base, an official residence, a museum depository and a school. It currently houses the Ministry for Sustainable Mobility (MSM).

== History ==
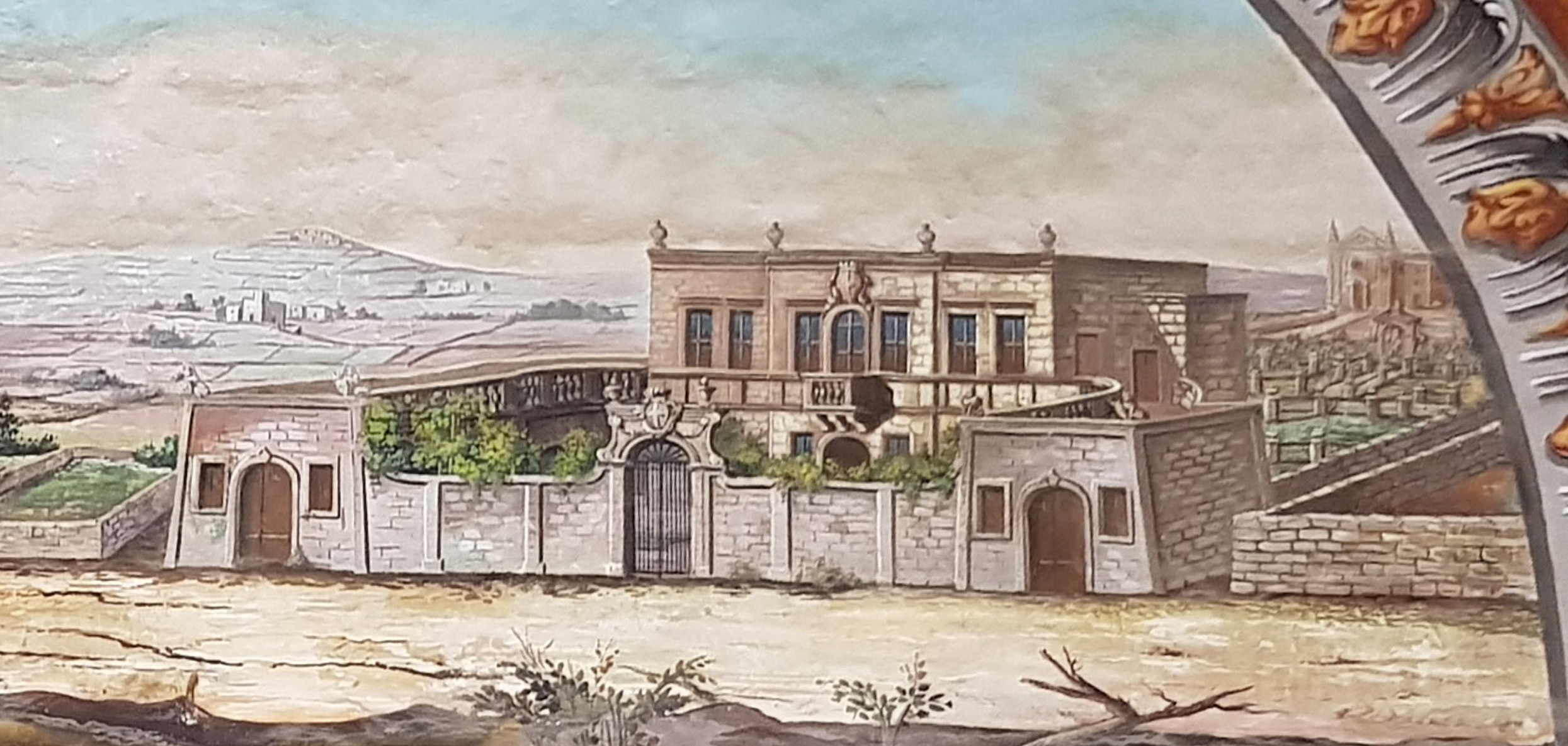
Casa Leoni from a fresco at the Grandmaster's Palace in Valletta. The Old Parish Church is seen in the background.

Casa Leoni was built in 1730 as a summer residence for Grand Master António Manoel de Vilhena, and it was originally called Palazzo Manoel. The building is located close to the Wignacourt Aqueduct, in an area that was originally in the limits of Ħamrun but which later became the separate locality of Santa Venera. It was designed by the French architect Charles François de Mondion.

During the French blockade of 1798–1800, Casa Leoni served as a command base for the Maltese insurgent National Congress Battalions. A grenadier company known as the Granatieri was set up specifically to guard this headquarters.

Casa Leoni subsequently became a residence for the Governor of Malta, and later for the Lieutenant-Governor. In the 1820s the Whitemore family owned the building with its gardens and around that period have welcomed the Hastings family at the building during the local feast of the old parish of Santa Venera. It was occasionally the host of theatre productions during the stay of Harry Luke and his wife Joyce Fremlin between 1930 and 1938.

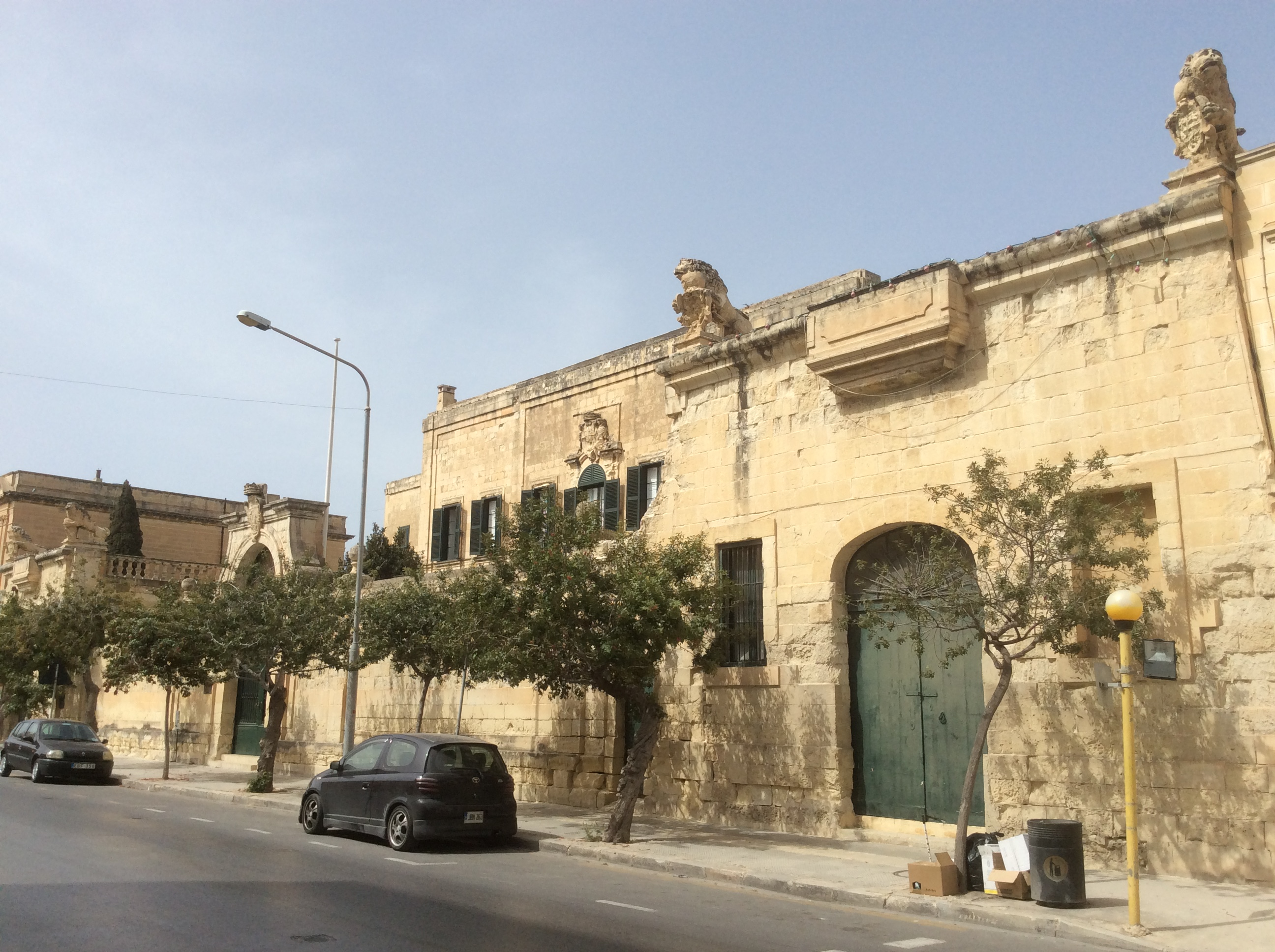
Entire façade of Casa Leoni

After World War II, it was used as a depository by the Museums Department. The building was converted into a museum in 1952, but the project was unsuccessful and it closed down soon afterwards. While serving as a museum, two gibbets from Villa Frere in Pietà were transferred to Casa Leoni. It later served as a government primary school until 1968.

The building was restored between 1977 and 1978, and it was briefly converted into a guest house for prominent visitors to Malta. It subsequently housed various government departments and ministries, including the Ministry for Education and Culture and the Ministry for Sustainable Development, the Environment and Climate Change. It currently houses the Ministry for Transport, Infrastructure and Capital Projects.

The building was included on the Antiquities List of 1925. It is now a Grade 1 national monument, and it is also listed on the National Inventory of the Cultural Property of the Maltese Islands.

== Architecture ==
=== Palace and front garden ===
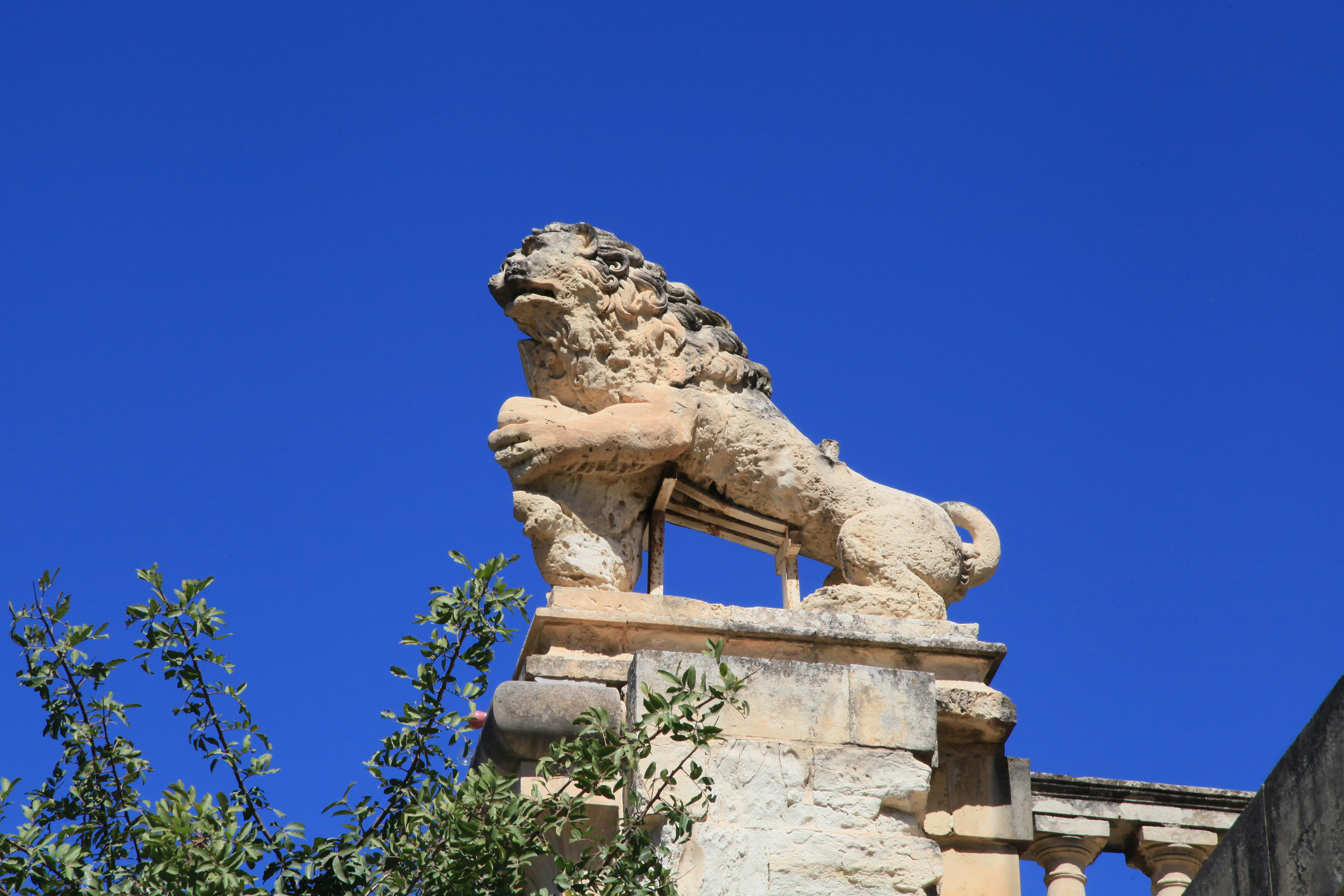
One of the four lion statues from which Casa Leoni gets its name

Casa Leoni is an example of Maltese Baroque architecture, with a simple but elegant design. Its façade contains an arched doorway at the centre of the ground floor, with a balcony above it. The door and balcony are flanked by several wooden louvered windows surrounded by mouldings.

Casa Leoni has a small front garden, and its entrance consists of an ornamental arched gateway decorated with the coat of arms of Grand Master Vilhena. Two rooms are located on either side of the gate, and carved stone lions holding an escutcheon with Vilhena's coat of arms are found on the roof of each room. The name Casa Leoni is derived from these carved lions.

=== Back garden ===
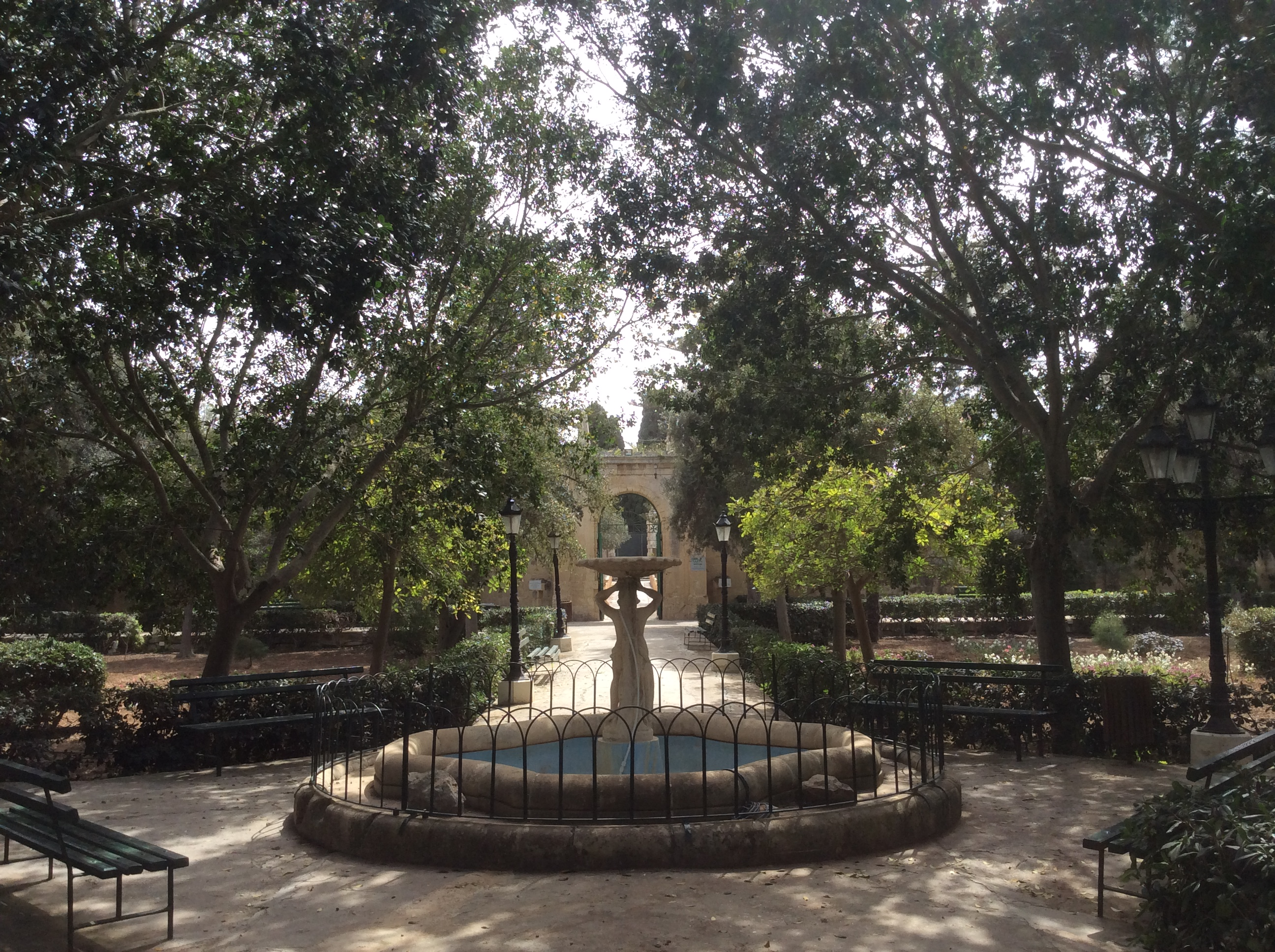
Romeo Romano Gardens

The palace also contains a large back garden, which is similar to that at San Anton Palace but on a smaller scale. It is the second largest Hospitaller-era garden in Malta after San Anton. A water lifting apparatus (Maltese: sienja) was installed in the gardens in the 19th century for irrigation purposes. Since 1977, most of the garden has been open to the public as Romeo Romano Gardens (Maltese: Ġnien Romeo Romano).

=== Stables and other gardens ===
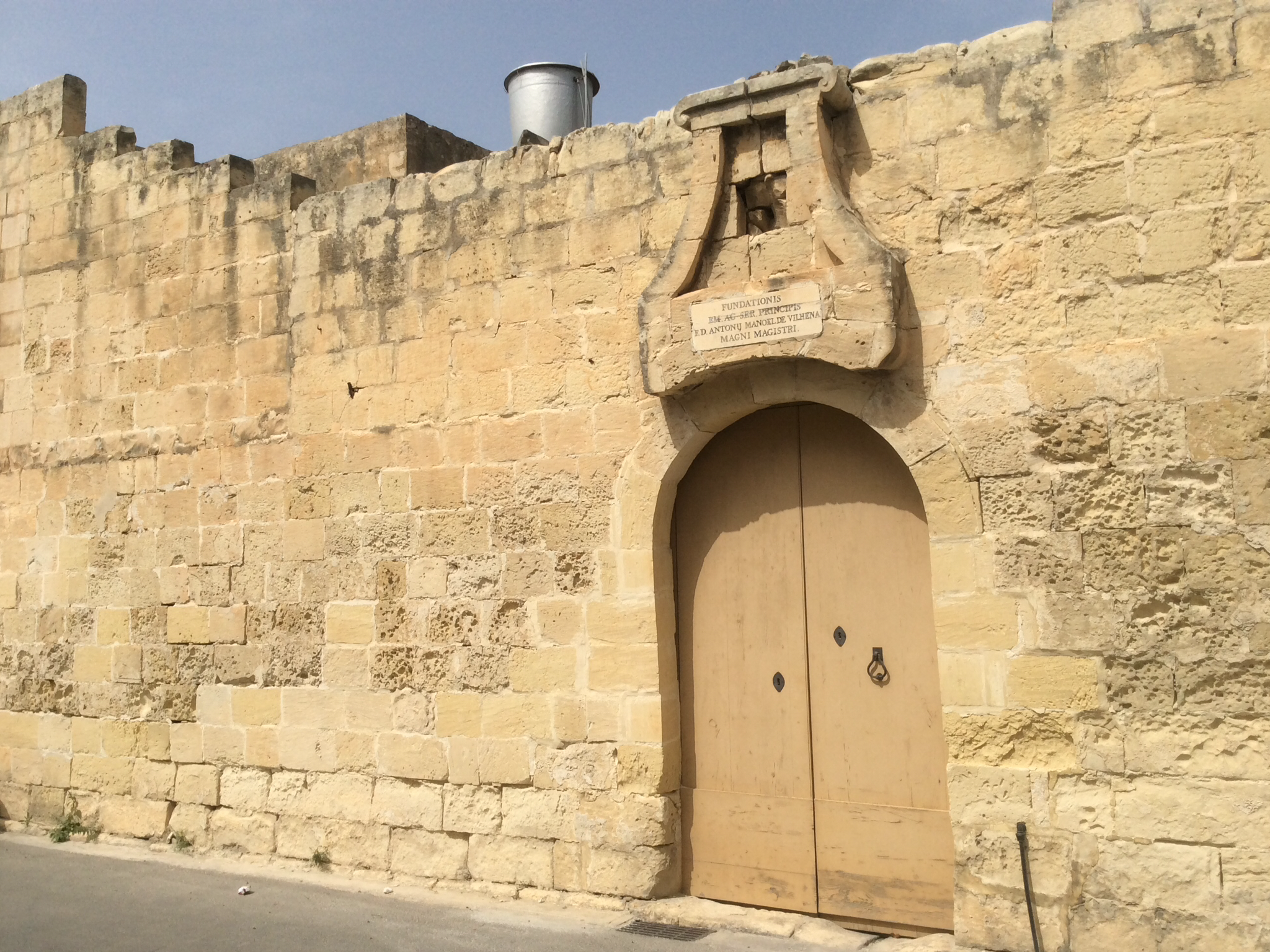
Manoel Foundation stables with Latin inscription

Around the same time as Casa Leoni was constructed, the Manoel Foundation (a foundation responsible for the upkeep of Fort Manoel) also purchased plots of land in the areas of il-Ħamrija and Santa Veneranda, close to the Old Church of Santa Venera, and converted them into gardens. A stable building was also constructed near the rear of Romeo Romano Gardens, and it has the following inscription above its entrance:

FUNDATIONIS

EM. AC. SER. PRINCIPIS
F.D. ANTONII MANOEL DE VILHENA
MAGNI MAGISTRI.

(meaning Foundation of the Most Eminent and Most Serene Prince, Fra Don António Manoel de Vilhena, Grand Master.)

Today, the gardens no longer exist but the stable building still stands.

== See also ==
- List of Baroque residences
- San Anton Palace
- Palazzo Vilhena
