= Chapel of the Immaculate Conception, Bengħisa =

Catholic church in Malta

Coordinates: 35°48′47″N 14°31′28″E

Chapel of the Immaculate Conception, Bengħisa

The Chapel of the Immaculate Conception is a Roman Catholic church in Bengħisa near the town of Birżebbuġa in the Southern Region of Malta. The church was built in 1822 for the use of local farmers by Rev. Ġakbu Gauci. The mason Francis Callus was the builder of the church. Between 1861 and 1862 the church was extensively rebuilt and extended by Rev. Ġuzepp Gauci, the nephew of founder Rev. Ġakbu Gauci. The chapel was consecrated by Gaetano Pace Forno in 1862. It is listed Grade 2 on the National Inventory of the Cultural Property of the Maltese Islands.

Above the doorway of the church is the belfry; the facade of the chapel is decorated with Tuscan pilasters. The name 'Concetta' is inscribed on the bell of the church. Professor and translator Pietru Pawl Saydon was the priest of the church for more than 30 years. Saydon translated the Bible into Maltese.
