= Carlo Diacono =

Maltese composer

Carlo Diacono (1 April 1876 – 15 June 1942) was a Maltese composer and church musician. The son of a musician, he was born in Żejtun, south east Malta and from 1892 to 1902 studied composition with Paolino Vassallo, choosing to stay in Malta rather than study abroad. He was appointed maestro di cappella at Mdina Cathedral and (in 1923) at St John's Co-Cathedral in Valletta, both positions following Vassallo. A breakthrough work was the opera L’Alpino of 1918, premiered at Valletta's Royal Opera House. It was revived in a concert performance at the Manoel Theatre in January 2025.

Diacono composed much church and choral music - such as the oratorio St Paul (1913), Messa de Requiem (1914), Il Cantico di Frate Sole (1927), Laudate Pueri (1937) and the Messa di Gloria in E flat (1938) - but there are also some orchestral and chamber music works. His Chopinesque Fantasie-Impromptu (1928) for solo piano has been recorded by Charlene Farrugia.

Diacono died at Lija in June 1942, aged 66. He was married to Maria Cannataci. His son Frankie Diacono (1914–1999) succeeded him as a composer and church musician.
