= Pietru Pawl Saydon =

Maltese Roman Catholic priest and scholar of the Maltese language, translator

Mgr Pietru Pawl Saydon

Pietru Pawl Saydon (24 July 1895 – 22 March 1971), was a Roman Catholic priest and scholar of the Maltese language, other semitic languages and the Bible. He was President of the Maltese Language Society (Ghaqda tal-Malti) at the University of Malta. He is most noteworthy for his contributions to the Maltese language, and the translation of the Bible from the original Hebrew to Maltese.

== Early years ==
Saydon was born on 24 July 1895, in Żurrieq. He went to the local primary school, before enrolling in the national Seminary. In 1912 he took a preparatory course in Literature at the University of Malta, and qualified with B.Litt. at the age of 20. in 1919, he qualified with a degree in Canonical Law, and a subsequent Doctorate in Theology. Having come top of class, he was granted a Governmental scholarship to be able to continue his studies abroad. In 1919 he was also ordained as a priest, and the following year left for the Pontifical Biblical Institute in Rome, where he obtained a Licence in Holy Scriptures in 1923.

== Bible translation ==
Saydon began his translation of the Bible from Hebrew to Maltese in 1929. This was notable for the fact that he did this entirely on his own, where other translations were typically completed in teams. It took him 30 years to complete, publishing the first version in 1959. This cost Saydon more than just his time - he financed his endeavours himself.

Saydon was appointed Professor of Holy Scripture at the University of Malta, and contributed actively to a number of international conferences and congresses. This introduced him to numerous biblical scholars worldwide, and exposed him to the tenets of Catholicism, Protestantism and Judaism. Between the years of 1932 and 1962 he attended no less than 17 different conferences across Europe. He was the founder of the Maltese Biblical Society, and awarded membership of the International Association of the Study of the Old Testament. He was also a member of the Society of Biblical Literature in the United States of America. He also provided commentaries for six books of the Old Testament in a Commentary published under the auspices of the Roman Catholic Church in England. This Catholic Commentary on Holy Scripture was published in London and Edinburgh in 1953.

A large number of my Maltese brethren can only read in their mother tongue, and have never ever felt in their hearts the sweetness of hearing in their language the word of God, as it came from Him hundreds and thousands of years ago. They were foremost in my mind as I did my work. However apart from these, I kept in mind all Maltese, that they may love and cherish their language.

Kotra kbira ta' ħuti l-Maltin ma jafux jaqraw ħlief bi lsienhom, u qatt u qatt ma ħassew f'qalbhom il-ħlewwa li jisimgħu fi lsienhom il-kelma t'Alla hekk kif ħarġet minn fommu mijiet u eluf ta' snin ilu. Għalihom l-ewwel ma ħsibt fix-xogħol tiegħi. Iżda barra minn dawn, jien ħaddant fil-ħsieb tiegħi il-Maltin kollha, li jħobbu u jgħożżu lsienhom.

== Setbacks ==
Although Saydon was considered the only qualified person for professorship of Holy Scripture in the University, in 1929 the Rector appointed Father Ugo Callus, a philosopher, to the post. This was a great disappointment for Saydon, but he was vindicated 7 years later when Callus left for Oxford in 1931. The vacant position was filled by Saydon, and thus at the age of 31 he was appointed Professor of Holy Scripture (in both Hebrew and Biblical Greek). He retained this position until his retirement in 1964. Saydon was also pipped to the post for a Lectoral Ministry in the Cathedral Chapter by Monsignor Nerik Dandria, who despite his inexperience in scripture studies, had strong political backing.

The Maltese Ecclesiastical authorities failed to recognise Saydon's merits, despite being given the title of monsignor in 1946 and being offered a position in the Cathedral. Saydon refused the latter, saying that his literary work conflicted with high positions in the Church. Although never seeking fame for his endeavours, he expressed ire at not receiving due recognition - thus he wrote in Il-Malti in 1953:

I never sought honours, and so if the world holds me back, I am not bothered. One thing cuts me to the bone, and that my words on matters of education was never listened to... and this for me was and is a great loss. Victorious is not he who is correct, but he who has the biggest weapons, and the weapons with which the world fights are not in my hands.

L-unuri qatt ma fittixthom, u għalhekk jekk id-dinja żżommni bi dħuli jew żorr xejn ma jolqotni. Ħaġa wahda tolqotni fil-laħam il-ħaj, il-kelma tiegħi fuq ħwejjeg ta' tagħlim qatt ma kienet mismugħa... U dan għalija kien u għadu telf kbir. Jirbaħ mhux min għandu raġun, imma min għandu l-aħjar armi, u l-armi li bihom tiġġieled id-dinja mhumiex f'idejja.

Maltese people living through the 1960s in Malta associated Saydon with the Catholic Interdiction in Malta, and the standoff between the Church and the Malta Labour Party. He was a controversial figure in the debates. On 26 March 1966, the day of the 1966 Maltese general election, Saydon wrote an opinion piece in Labour-leaning paper L-Orizzont, saying that contrary to the Pastoral Letter issued by the Bishop, a vote for Labour did not constitute a sin, and that everyone was free to vote according to their conscience.

Consequently, Saydon was suspended from his duties by then Archbishop Mikiel Gonzi. Saydon was the subject of much abuse, accused of being 'crazy', schismatic and liable for excommunication. He frequently said that he was not a political entity, but despite this played a significant role on the sidelines.

== Maltese language ==
In his 33 years as Professor at the University of Malta, he worked tirelessly to research the Maltese language. He was well liked by his students, being a relatively young academic not given to a great ego. He would sometimes invite them to his house in Bengħisa. He frequently wrote about his relationship with his students:

I loved teaching and I loved my students. Studying, for me, was never a step for my personal advancement, and neither work of monetary gain, but my life's mission.

Ħabbejt it-tagħlim u ħabbejt l-istudenti. L-istudju għalija qatt ma kien tarġa biex nogħla aktar u anqas xogħol ta' qligħ ta' flus, imma l-missjoni ta' ħajti.

His interest in the Maltese language was sparked by the similarities between Maltese and Hebrew. He was convinced that:

without the light shed by semitic languages, we would never come to know about Maltese, its roots, the life of the language and that which differentiates it from every other language.

mingħajr id-dawl tal-ilsna semin (semitiċi) qatt ma jista' jkun li naslu biex nagħrfu xi ħajja dwar il-Malti, fuq in-nisel tiegħu, fuq il-ħajja tiegħu, fuq il-bixra tiegħu li tagħżlu minn kull ilsien ieħor.

At the time of his personal setbacks after returning from his studies in Rome, he immersed himself into progressing the works of the University's Maltese Language Association, this having just been founded by two medic-poets, Rużar Briffa and Guze Bonnici. When Briffa resigned from the Association as he was due to study abroad, Saydon was elected as President of the group. This was around the time of a political debate in the country about whether Italian, English or indeed Maltese should be recognised as the national language of Malta. In 1932, the Government at the time tried to return Italian as the national language, and ordered that Maltese should be written and taught in a fashion that would promote the use of the Italian Language. Saydon, on behalf of the Association, sent a letter of protest to the education minister, Enrico Mizzi. The Association was then banned from holding any other meetings at the University, under the pretence of it being politically motivated. This decision was reversed a year later in 1933, and its meetings resumed.

=== Other works ===
In 1936, Saydon, together with Ġużè Aquilina, published Ward ta' Qari Malti an anthology of prose and poetry in Maltese.

Saydon was also an accomplished author. He wrote a number of novels, including Gmajru u l-Karozzi, L-Istedina tas-Sinjura Betta, and Bejn l-Erba' Ħitan tad-Dar, as well as a number of essays such as Fuq il-Monti, Tieġ f'Raħal u Fil-Ħemda tal-Lejl. It is said that what Dun Karm Psaila did for poetry, Saydon did for prose.

Saydon was a devotee of Saint Catherine, the patron saint of Żurrieq, and wrote a religious novel in three acts, entitled simply Santa Katerina.

On 12 November 1966, The University awarded him an Honorary Doctorate of Literature in recognition of his work.

== Priesthood ==
Saydon's pastoral work was carried out without much fanfare - he was much loved by the villagers of Bengħisa, most of whom were farmers. He would celebrate an early mass at 04:30 to enable them to hear mass before they started work in the fields, and would frequently visit them in their homes. He would avoid large social gatherings, but would instead seek the company of his students, as well as members of the MUSEUM. He would frequently teach at the local branch in Żurrieq, and would make monetary donations to the organisation. Saydon left the copyright of his translation of the Bible to the MUSEUM, which then went on to publish multiple editions.

In 1946, Pope Pius XII appointed Saydon as a Papal chamberlain, allowing him to use the title of Monsignor.

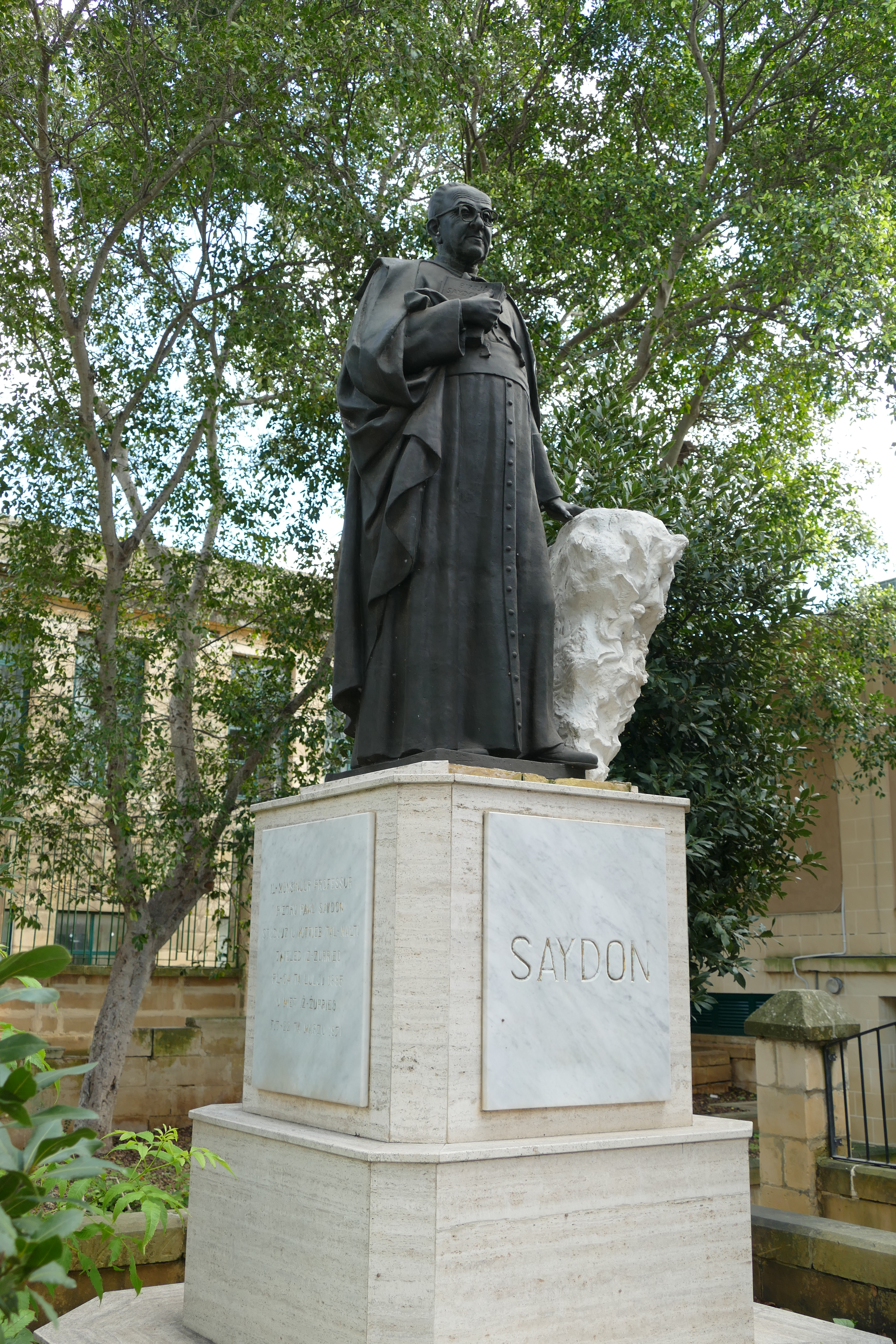
Statue of Pietru Pawl Saydon in Żurrieq

== Death ==
In 1965 Saydon suffered a stroke. In the years leading up to his death, he was twice admitted to the clergy Hospital in Attard. He died in his home in Żurrieq on 22 March 1971.

Following his death, a secondary school as well as a street in his hometown of Żurrieq were named after him. A monument in his honour was unveiled on the hundredth anniversary of his birth, on 12 November 1995, in front of his namesake secondary school in Żurrieq. There is another monument dedicated to Saydon in the grounds of the Junior College Sixth Form, in Msida. One of the main halls in the University of Malta also bears his name.
