= Vincenzo Bugeja =

19th century Maltese businessman and philanthropist

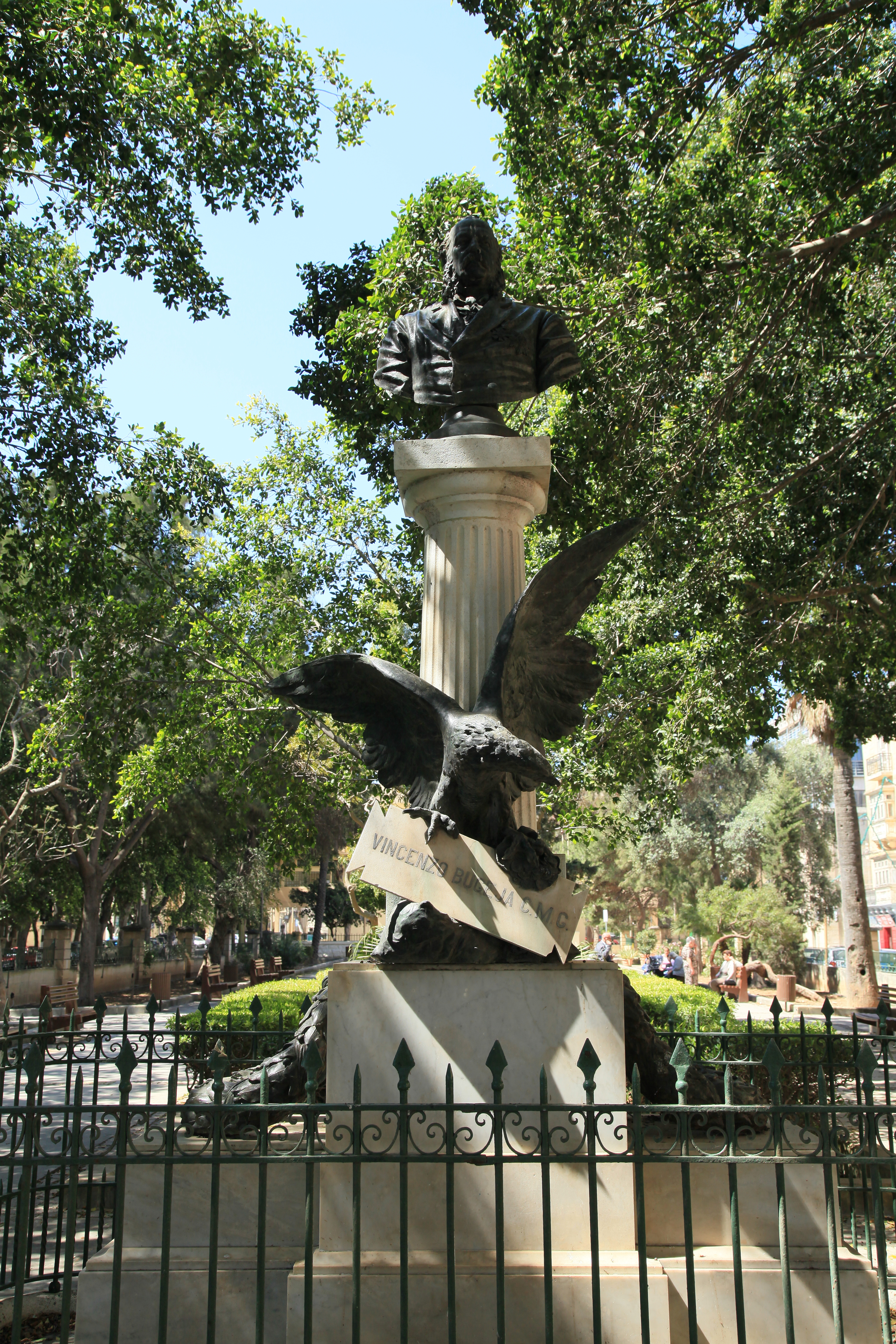
Monument to Bugeja at Floriana's Mall

Vincenzo Bugeja (1820-1890) was a Maltese businessman and philanthropist.

Bugeja made his wealth by gambling in the casinos of Europe, from Montecarlo onwards, where he earned the nickname as "the Maltese Matador". He is rumoured to have almost bankrupted the bank in Baden. He married Anna Darbois of Naples; they did not have children. They lived in a stately home on St Barbara Bastion, Valletta.

In the second half of the 19th century Bugeja was active in Maltese politics. As member of the Council of Government, he was responsible for several amendments in the criminal and commercial laws of Malta.

With his winnings, Bugeja founded charities for the sick and the poor, bequeathing 20,000 pounds for that aim. Since May 1880 he financed the new Conservatorio in Hamrun (which will get his name) so that orphan girls could get boarding and education by the Sisters of Charity.

In his will Bugeja also established the Bugeja Fund for Migrants, with an endowment of 500,000 French francs. Prospective beneficiaries had to be Maltese nationals, male, 17-26 years of age, unmarried, healthy, of good conduct, able to speak English, Italian or French, with a basic knowledge of arithmetic and calligraphy, and belonging to the middle class. These were very restrictive conditions. Some 69 Maltese emigrants received support from the fund between 1901 and 1911, in particular few who moved to Winnipeg, Canada.

Due to his largess, Pope Leo XIII made him a Marquis on 19 April 1887. He was also made a Knight of the Garter by Prince Edward of Wales during his stop in Malta on his way back from India.

He was honoured with a monument at the Maglio Gardens in Floriana. The Vincenzo Bugeja Secondary School for Boys in Santa Venera is named after him.

== See also ==
- Emigration from Malta
- Ioannis Papafis

== Bibliography ==
- Profiles in Maltese Migration by Fr Lawrence E. Attard, 2003, PEG, Malta
