= Paolino Vassallo =

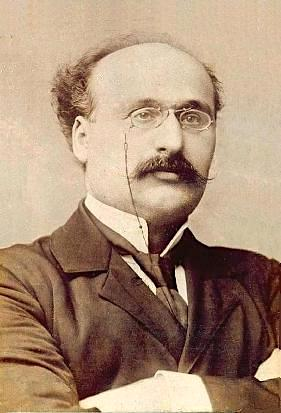
Paolino Vassallo

Paolino Vassallo (born 24 July 1856 in Cospicua - deceased 20 January 1923 in Valletta) was a Maltese composer.

== Biography ==
Paolino Vassallo was the son of Salvatore Vassallo and Victoria Xicluna. At the age of 19, he moved to Paris to study at the Conservatoire Royal with Massenet and Guiraud. He performed as first violin, and later conductor, of the Opéra-Comique.

He founded his Musical Institute in Valletta in 1885 and was appointed the maestro di cappella at Mdina Cathedral in 1902. His pupils included Giuseppe Caruana (1880-1931), Carlo Diacono and Josie Mallia Pulvirenti. Vassallo wrote three operas; Amor Fatale, Frazir and Edith Cavell. He refused the Grand Prix de Rome to keep his British nationality, and returned to Malta in 1888; here, he met his wife Marianna. In 1905, he was appointed Maestro di cappella of the Mdina Cathedral and the Co-Catheral of St. John in Valletta. During this position he enforced the application of the Motu Proprio decreed in 1910.

Vassallo wrote four operas, of which one (Amor Fatal, 1898) was based on an earlier one (Francesca da Rimini, 1888). His most famous work for the stage is arguably Edith Cavell, a melodrama in three acts to a libretto by poet Alfonso Giglio. It received its première at the Teatru Rjal (Valletta, Malta) on 21 March 1927, four years after Vassallo's death, and was an immediate sensational triumph.

Vassallo died on 30 January 1923. He was featured on a Maltese postage stamp in 2006. There is also a school, Paolino Vassallo Upper Lyceum, and a square, the Pjazza Paolino Vassallo (in Bormla), named after him. In 2007, the National Orchestra of Malta released a live CD of Vassallo's orchestral works.

== Works ==
=== Orchestral ===
- Scherzo, Andante e Finale for orchestra (sometimes referred to as a symphony)
- Malta, overture
- Ad Gloriam, overture
- Les Astres, Valses de Concert
- Andante for Strings
- Marcia Religiosa e Fuga per Grande Orchestra

=== Concertante ===
- Andante for Violin and Orchestra (written as the second movement of an unfinished Violin Concerto)

=== Opera ===
- Francesca da Rimini (opera in one act, 1888)
- Amor Fatal (two-act opera based on Francesca da Rimini, 1898)
- Frazir (opera, 1905)
- Edith Cavell (opera, 1923)

=== Choral ===
- Grande Messa (choral, 1889)
- Messa da Requiem (choral, 1893)

== Awards ==
- 1895: Moody-Manners International Competition for the 2-act opera Amor Fatale
