= Nazzareno Camilleri =

Maltese philosopher (1906–1973)

- Born: 10 November 1906; Sliema, Malta
- Died: 1973 (66 years); Rome, Italy
- Burial place: Cemetery of Genzano, Rome, Italy
- Occupations: Philosophy, Education, Asceticism

Nazzareno Camilleri (1906–1973) was a Maltese philosopher, theologian, and mystic. His areas of specialization in philosophy were chiefly metaphysics and pedagogy.

== Life ==
=== Beginnings ===
Camilleri was born at Sliema, Malta, on 10 November 1906. Since his family lived very close to the Salesian oratory there, he was familiar with the Salesians from a very tender age. He joined them at the young age of fifteen, in 1921, and immediately sent to Sicily to continue his studies at San Gregorio di Catania.

He studied there up till 1926, when subsequently he was enrolled at the Jesuit Pontifical Gregorian University in Rome to pursue his institutional studies for the priesthood. There he successfully completed his philosophy (1926–29) and theology (1931–35) courses. Between the two (1929–31), he was sent for a short stint to Sicily to teach at San Gregorio di Catania. He was ordained a priest in Malta in 1934.

=== Pre-war and war periods ===
After finishing his studies in Rome, Camilleri was sent to Rome, to the Salesian oratory situated close to the Catacombs of San Callisto. Here he was appointed professor of theology and Prefect of Studies.

Camilleri stayed there for two years, until 1937. He was afterwards sent to teach moral theology at the Don Bosco International Institute at the Crocetta, Turin. Here he stayed for another two years, at the end of which he successfully completed his doctorate in theology.

In 1940, when Italy entered World War II on the Axis side, Camilleri was interned, since, as a Maltese citizen, he was a British subject. He spent the war period in the north of Italy, first at Chieri (1940–42), then at Montalenghe (1942–45). At Chieri he was Director of the Salesian theology students; at Montalenghe, Dean of the Faculty of Philosophy.

=== At Turin, Rome and death ===
After the end of the war, Camilleri was back at Turin as Dean of the Faculty of Theology at the Salesian Pontifical University. He stayed in this office for nine years (1945–54), teaching dogmatic theology and asceticism. Afterwards, at the same university, he taught at the Institute of Pedagogy and Religious Studies (later, in 1956, called the Faculty of Educational Sciences) eleven years, up till 1965.

At the close of that academic year (1964–65), the whole of the Turin branch of the university was assimilated by the Rome branch. Thus Camilleri continued to teach at Salesian Pontifical University in Rome for another year, retiring from his teaching profession due to ill health in 1966..

He died in Rome in 1973, in aura sanctitatis (in fame of holiness). He was buried at the Cemetery of Genzano in Rome within the chapel of the Salesians.

=== Sainthood ===
Twenty-one years after Camilleri’s death, in 1994, the Salesians began the process for his canonisation. The so-called Evidential Statements of Witness to his heroic virtues were published in 1989. Camilleri bears the title of Venerable.

== Works ==
=== Unpublished Journal ===
Between September 1923 and February 1973 (nine days before his death), Camilleri held a diary which was never intended to be published or even read by others. Its Italian publishers call it Diario Intimo (Intimate Journal). Unfortunately, only short extracts of this remarkable document have ever been published. It runs over twenty-eight registers containing in all some four thousand pages. They are held at the archives of the Salesian Pontifical University in Rome.

=== Representative writings ===
The following works are probably the most representative works of Camilleri’s philosophical thought and speculation.

- 1949 – De Ineffabili Essentia Metaphysica Libertatis (Concerning the Essential Transcendental Metaphysics of Freedom). A 55-page book in Latin published in Turin. The main thesis in this work is that freedom is a relationship which is intentionally chosen. However, at the same time, freedom suffers no change in itself.
- 1958 – Una Tesi Antiprobabilista (An Anti-Probabilistic Thesis). A 33-page book in Italian published in Turin. The work is a philosophical-moral investigation on the problem of probabilism.
- 1965 – Relazionismo Co-Ontologico (Co-Ontological Relationships). A 72-page article published in the book De Deo: Praelecitonum Selectio (Concerning God: A choice of articles) in Rome. This is purely metaphysical work which investigates the qualities and the most intimate and profound nature of the relationship between creation and the creator. In other words, it is a study of the metaphysical (or radical) relationship between beings and absolute being.
- Undated – De ‘Adoptiva’ nostra Filiatione Divina (Our ‘Adoptive’ Divine Sonship). A manuscript held at the Salesian Pontifical University in Rome typed by Camilleri himself. It is basically 105 pages of class notes in which, apart from fundamental issues, Camilleri deals with the communication of divine life to humans through Jesus Christ.

=== Other works ===
The following are the other published works of Camilleri. Though no review is provided here, any one of these works might be of interest to philosophy, especially for a holistic view of Camilleri’s philosophy.

- 1944 – De Natura Actus Visionis Beatificæ (Concerning the Nature of the Actual Beatific Vision; unpublished)
- 1951 – Preparazione specifica all’Apostolato dell’Educazione (The Specific Preparation needed for Educational Apostolate)
- 1953 – Confessori Educatori (Educational Confessors)
- 1957 – Da Mihi Animas (Offering My Own Soul)
- 1957 – L’Ex-Allievo Salesiano Provveduto (Supplying the Salesian Ex-Student)
- 1958 – La Devozione Mariana nel Santo Adoloscente Domenico Savio (The Marian Devotion of the Adolescent Saint Dominic Savio)
- 1959 – Defensor Putitatis (The Defender of Purity)
- 1960 – Principi di Pedagogia Cristiana (Principles of Christian Pedagogy)
- 1961 – The Problem of Teenage Purity
- 1961 – I Novissimi e la Comunione dei Santi (The End of Times and the Communion of Saints)
- 1962 – La Maestra delle Novizie (The Superior of Female Novices)
- 1962 – La Grande Indulgenza del Lavoro (The Great Indulgence of Labour)
- 1962 – Spirito e Opera della S. Maria D. Mazzarello (The Spirit and Work of St. Mary D. Mazzarello)
- 1963 – Teologia Pneumatica della Prudenza Cristiana (The Spiritual Theology of Christian Prudence)
- 1964 – Il Direttore Salesiano (The Salesian Director)
- 1966 – Teologia e Liturgia (Theology and Liturgy)
- 1967 – Costituzione Dogmatica sopra la Chiesa; Decreto sopra le Chiese Orientali Cattoliche (The Dogmatic Constitution on the Church; [and] the Decree on the Eastern Catholic Churches [of the Second Vatican Council])
- 1967 – La Chiesa nel Mondo Contemporaneo; L’Apostolato dei Laici; I Mezzi della Comunicazione Sociale (The Church in the Modern World; the Apostolate of the Laity; [and] the Media of Social Communications [of the Second Vatican Council])

=== Articles ===
Camilleri published some 360 articles. These have still not been classified or compiled, much less studied or analysed. The articles were published in journals such as the following:

==== Abroad ====
Salesianum, Orientamenti Pedagogici, Rivista di Pedagogia e Scienze Religiose, Perfice Munus, Doctor Communis, Catechesi, Didascalia, Settimana del Clero, Meridiano 12, Rivista dei Giovani, Presenza Cristiana (Catania), Bollettino Salesiano, Voci Fraterne, Le Campagnie, Can Roma, Teatro dei Giovani, Il Salesiano Coadiutore, Unione, L’Osservatore Romano, Il Nostro Tempo, and Il Popolo Nuovo.

==== In Malta ====
Buttlettin Salesjan, Lehen is-Sewwa, Il-Hajja, The Future, Times of Malta, Il Ponte, and Malta.

== Influence ==
The work of Camilleri was all related to education, particularly education of the youth. Well known for his personal religiousness, Camilleri was known for his respect of Thomas Aquinas, and desired that his students learn to read him. Due to this reverence, In his teaching and writings he communicated the security and finesse he encountered in the philosophy of scholasticism. This philosophy of Scholasticism he linked to his perceived view of the sensibility and practicality of the Second Vatican Council.

Camilleri was seemingly not attracted to positive research for its own sake. He seems to have seen his philosophical studies in the context of concrete life, particularly the Christian way of life.

Further reading

- Eugenio Valentini, ed., Articoli di Prova Tesimoniale (Evidential Statements of Witness), Università Pontificia Salesiana, Rome, Italy, 1989.

== See also ==
- Philosophy in Malta
