= Old Church of Santa Venera =

- Knisja l-Qadima ta' Santa Venera
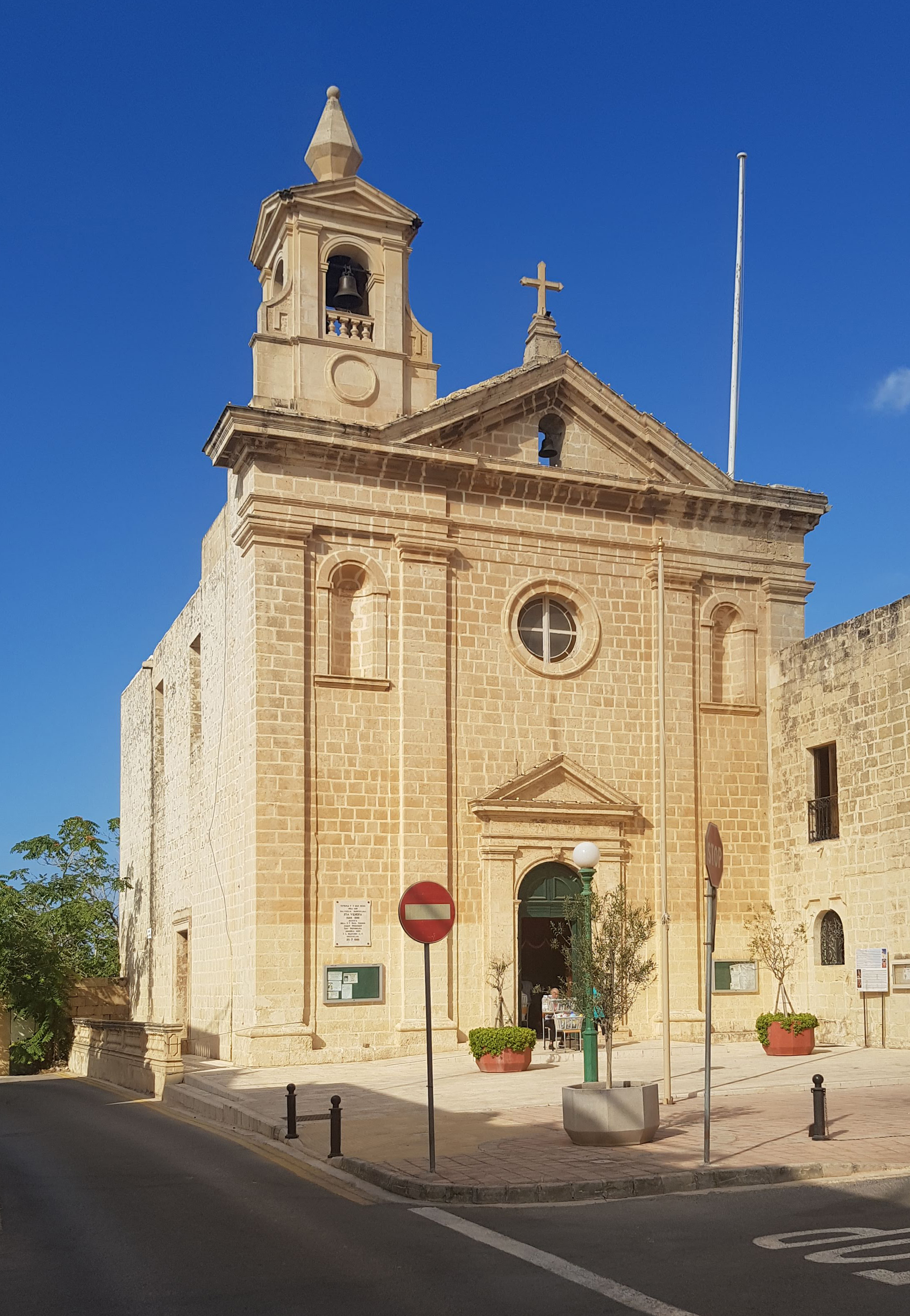
- Façade of the church
- Old Church of Santa Venera
- 35°53′30.8″N 14°28′43″E
- Location: Santa Venera
- Country: Malta
- Denomination: Roman Catholic
- Religious order: Carmelites

History
- Status: Church
- Founded: 1473
- Dedication: Saint Venera

Architecture
- Functional status: Active
- Years built: 1658–1688

Specifications
- Materials: Limestone

Administration
- Archdiocese: Malta
- Parish: Santa Venera

The Old Church of Santa Venera (Maltese: Knisja l-Qadima ta' Santa Venera) is a Roman Catholic church in Santa Venera, Malta, dedicated to saint of the same name. It was built between 1658 and 1688 on a site of a 15th-century church. It was the town's parish church from 1918 to 1989, when the parish was transferred to the new Santa Venera Parish Church.

== History ==
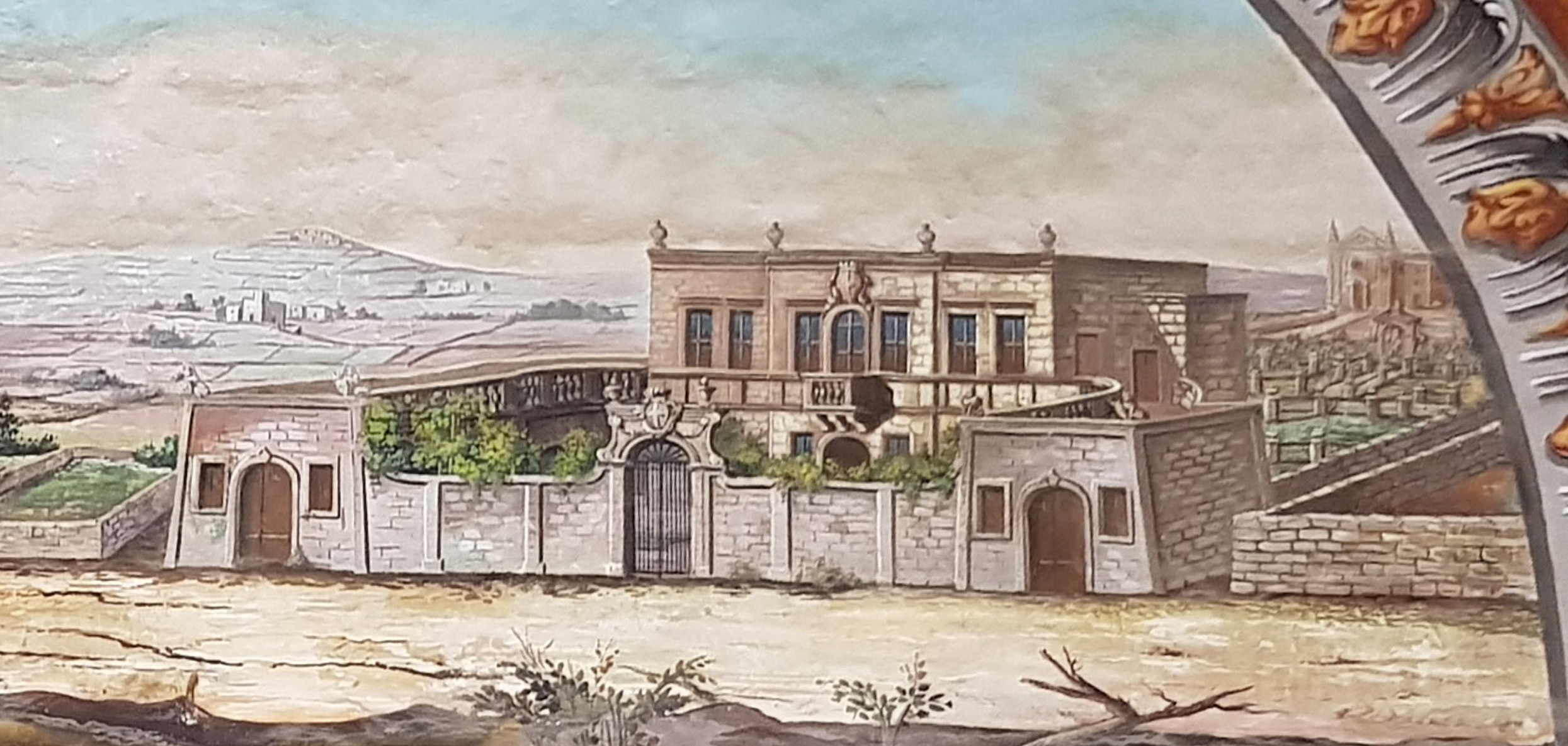
The church (without its belfry) as depicted on a fresco at the Grandmaster's Palace in Valletta.

The first church which stood on the site was built in 1473, and it was enlarged in 1500. It was rebuilt between 1658 and 1688. The present configuration of the building dates back to the 19th century. The church was given to the Carmelites on 12 December 1912, and it became a parish church on 4 September 1918. It is located adjacent to a friary and a school.

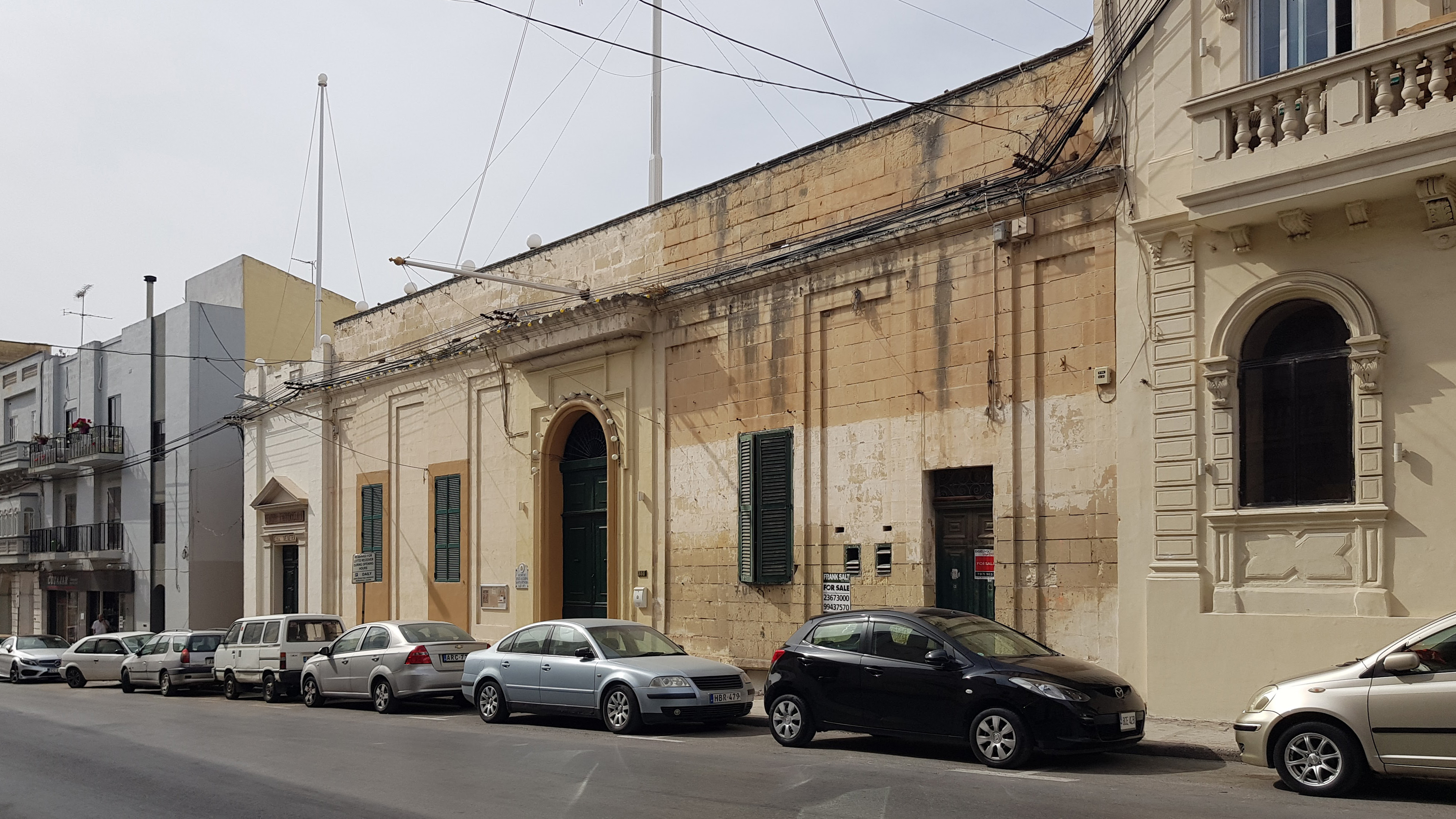
Château Lonz

The church became too small to cater for the town's growing population by the mid-20th century, so a storeroom in Château Lonz began to be used as a temporary church in 1947, and a new parish church began to be built in 1954. The old church remained the parish church until 3 December 1989, while the new church building was still incomplete.

In 2017, when some paintings were removed to be sent for restoration, Baroque and Rococo frescoes believed to date back to the 17th century were discovered on the walls.

The church building is listed on the National Inventory of the Cultural Property of the Maltese Islands.

== Artworks ==
The altarpiece is attributed to Stefano Erardi. The church also contains a number of paintings by the school of Mattia Preti and by the Maltese artist Giuseppe Calì.
