= Saint Venera =

2nd-century Christian saint and martyr

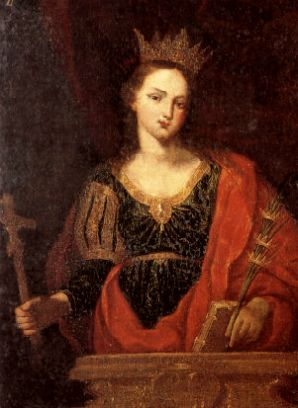

Martyr
- Born: 100 AD. ca.
- Died: 143 AD. ca.
- Venerated in: Roman Catholic Church; Eastern Orthodox Church; Oriental Orthodox Church
- Major shrine: Acireale Cathedral
- Feast: November 14 ; July 26
- Attributes: crown; book; palm; cross; a palm of martyrdom interlaced with a triple crown (signifying the fact that she was a Virgin, an Apostle, and a Martyr)
- Patronage: Acireale; Santa Venera, Malta; Grotte, Santa Venerina, Avola; in Sicily, invoked against volcanic eruptions, specifically those associated with Mount Etna, as well as earthquakes.

Saint Venera (Veneranda, Veneria, Venerina, Parasceve, Il Ahba) is venerated as a Christian martyr of the 2nd century. Little is known of this saint. The date of her death is traditionally given as July 26, 143 AD.

In the Catalogo Sanctorum, composed by Petrus de Natalibus between 1369 and 1372, he cites in Chapter 61 the name of a virgin martyr named Veneranda. According to de Natalibus, Veneranda was born in Gaul in the 2nd century and martyred in Rome during the time of Emperor Antoninus Pius (138-161 AD).

The double of saint Paraskevi of Rome who also is celebrated July 26.

== Background ==
A version of her legend states that Venera, as a girl, studied the Gospel with zeal, and left her home in Gaul to become a missionary. She travelled to Grotte, in Sicily, and preached there, and lived in a cave, near present-day Corso Garibaldi. She became well loved amongst the local populace, and she tended to the sick. It is said her visits would leave behind a scent of roses. She was kidnapped and taken to Acireale, and was subjected to tortures there, including being boiled in hot oil, from which she emerged even more beautiful than before. Ultimately, she was decapitated, and her body was placed in the catacomb of Santa Domitilla.

According to one version of her legend, her parents were two noble Christians named Agatho (Agatone) and Hippolyte (Ippolita). When their daughter was born, the mother wanted to call her Venera, but the father, not wanting to create associations with the goddess Venus, changed his daughter's name to Veneranda, a rough Latin translation of the Greek name Paraskevi ("Friday," literally "Preparation"). Venera or Veneranda studied the Scriptures and lives of the martyrs as a child, and when her parents died, she dedicated herself to helping the poor and the sick. She distributed her wealth across Sicily and preached on the Italian mainland as well, such as at Calabria and Campania.

She was on her way to Rome when she was arrested by the Roman prefect Antonius, who attempted to force her to renounce her faith with temptations and an offer of marriage, and then by torture. Antonius had her wear a helmet of red-hot iron, had her nailed on a cross, and placed on her chest a large block of sandstone. However, Venera survived all of these tortures and converted the men who were assigned to torture her. The prefect had her placed in a hot cauldron of oil and sulphur for seven days, but Venera was unharmed. The prefect, after seeing Venera was unharmed, asked the saint if it was magic protecting her. When Venera asked the prefect to approach the cauldron to determine this, he refused. Venera then scooped up some of the burning sulphur and oil in her hand, and threw it in the prefect's face, blinding him. Subsequently, Antonius freed her and converted to Christianity.

Venera then converted many across Magna Graecia, and drew the attention of a ruler named Themius or Theotimus (Temio, Teotimo), who also subjects Venera to tortures, including the ones that Saint Agatha is said to have suffered her breast being sliced off. Venera also vanquished a dragon. Themius was also subsequently converted. Venera then traveled to Gaul, and was ultimately decapitated after once again enduring tortures under the prefect Asclepius. Before dying, Venera demolished a temple dedicated to Apollo by reciting a prayer. Her body was left exposed to the elements but remained miraculously intact.

== Veneration ==
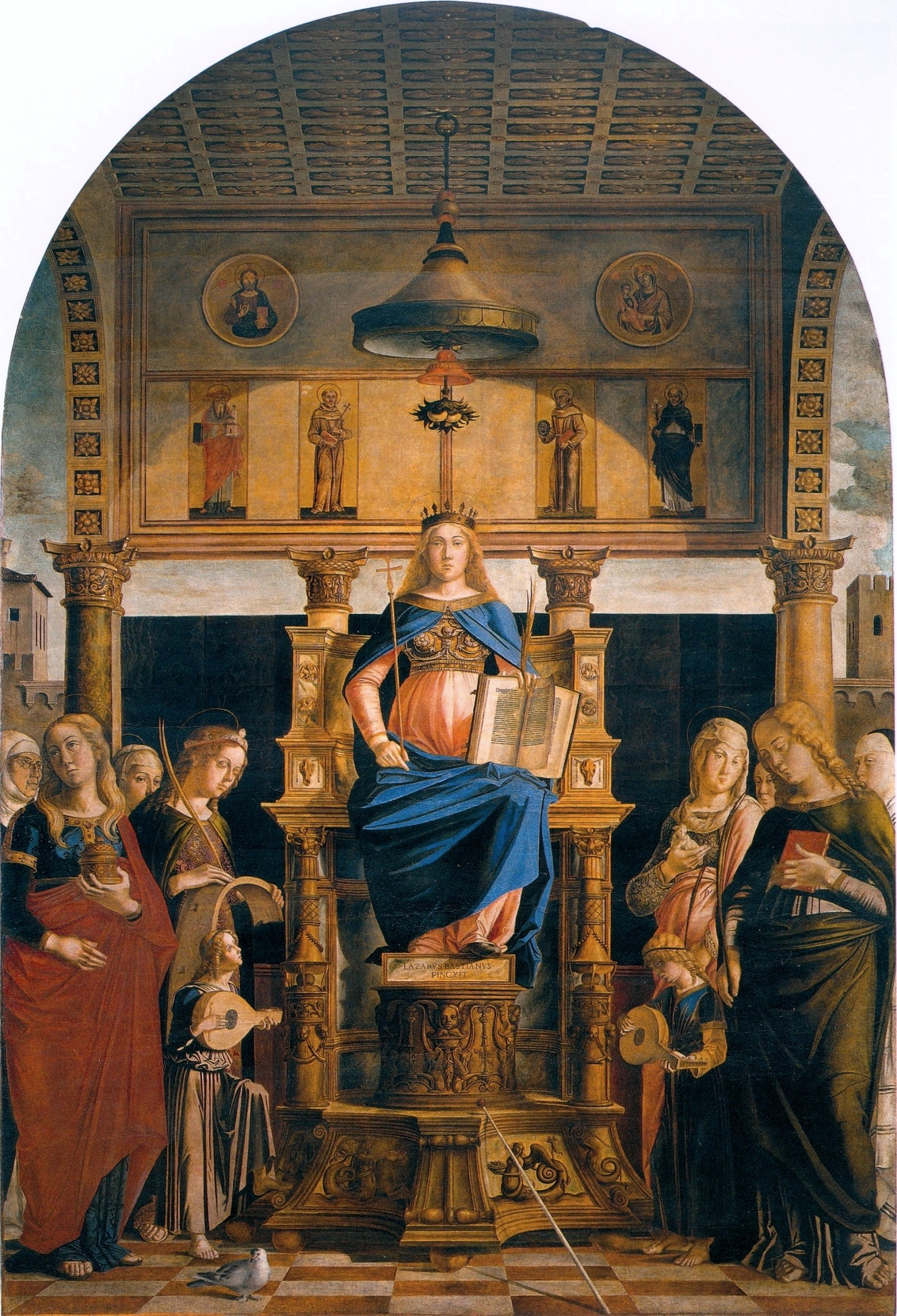
St Veneranda Enthroned, by Lazzaro Bastiani, between 1470 and 1475.

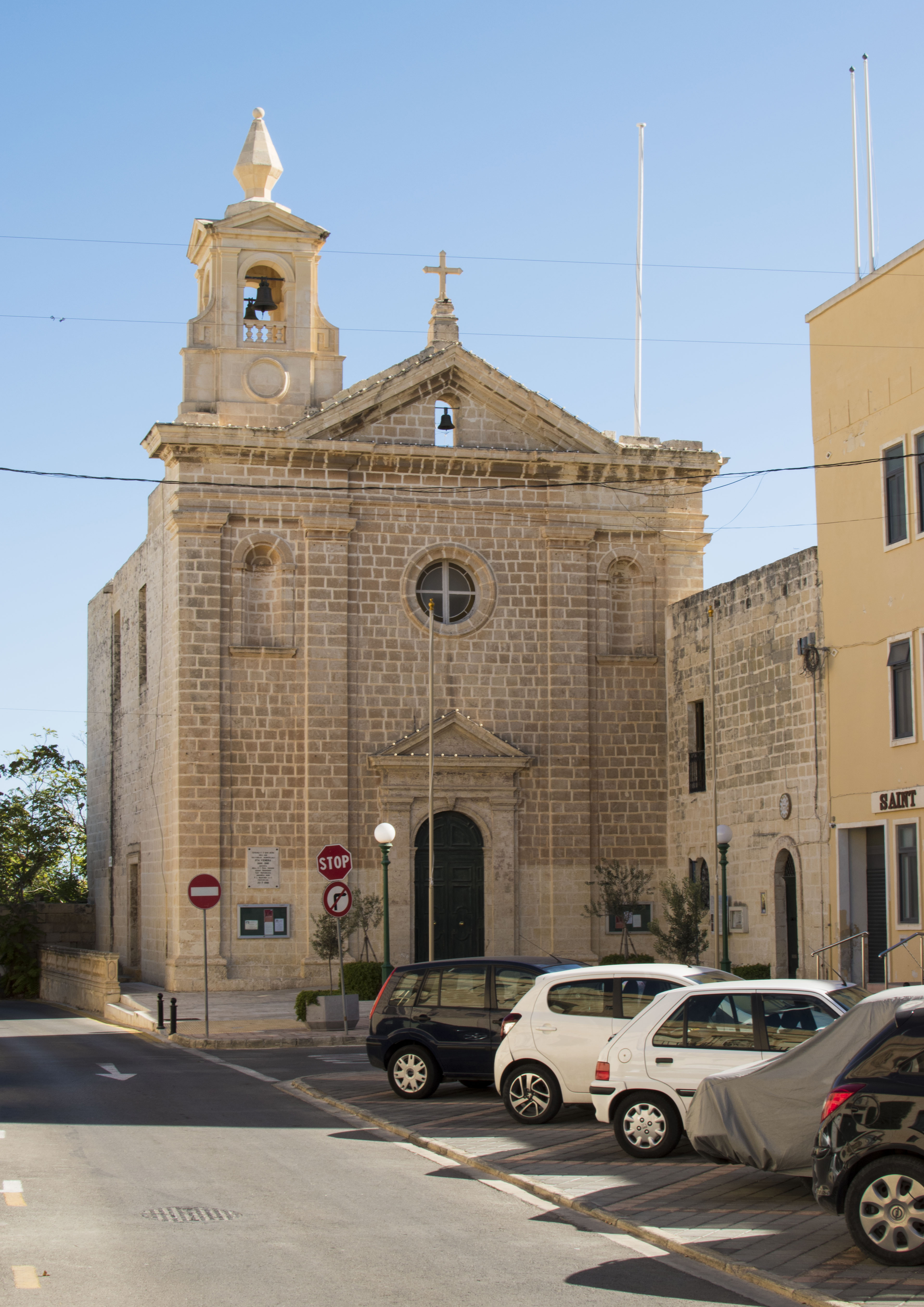
The old parish church of Santa Venera, Malta

After her martyrdom in Gaul, Christians are said to have transported her body to Ascoli Piceno, where it was venerated until the 4th century, and then taken by a priest named Anthimus (Antimo) to Rome on November 14. At the end of the Middle Ages, the relics were reclaimed by Acireale, but relics associated with Venera were distributed across Sicily and Italy.

At the beginning of the 17th century, Venera's cult flourished, when the relics of the saint were transferred from the Church of Jesus and Mary to the Cathedral of Acireale. In 1668, the Sacred Congregation of Rites officially approved her cult.

Records from the basilica of Santa Maria a Pugliano in Ercolano state that Pope Alexander VII donated relics associated with Veneranda and a Saint Maximus in the 17th century to the Procurator General of the Carmelites in Rome. These were then given to Father Simone dello Spirito Santo, of the Carmelite convent of Torre del Greco, near Ercolano, establishing Veneranda's popularity and the diffusion of her cult in the area of Ercolano.

The city of Ercolano has two churches dedicated to Veneranda, and a painting dedicated to her in the city shows her name in Greek as Aghia Paraskebe (Saint Paraskevi), which attests to an identification of Veneranda with the martyr Paraskevi of Rome, celebrated on July 26.

Venera or Veneranda is the patroness of the Maltese town of Santa Venera. The saint's connection to this town is in doubt. As one source states: "Santa Venera is a very old place, much older than its name, unless they are right who declare that no such Christian saint ever existed as Venera, and that the name is simply a variant of venere, and nothing more nor less than the Italian form of the name of the goddess of love. These people maintain that the hill-town of Aphrodisia stood on this site, and the church of Santa Venera was a temple of Aphrodite seven hundred years before Christianity had any martyrs."

Santa Veneranda is the patron Saint of the Arbëresh Town of Carfizzi in Calabria, Italy.

Santa Venera is the patron Saint of the S.venera di mascali

Venera is the patron saint of Avola.
