= Santa Venera =

Santa Venera Saint Venera
- Local council
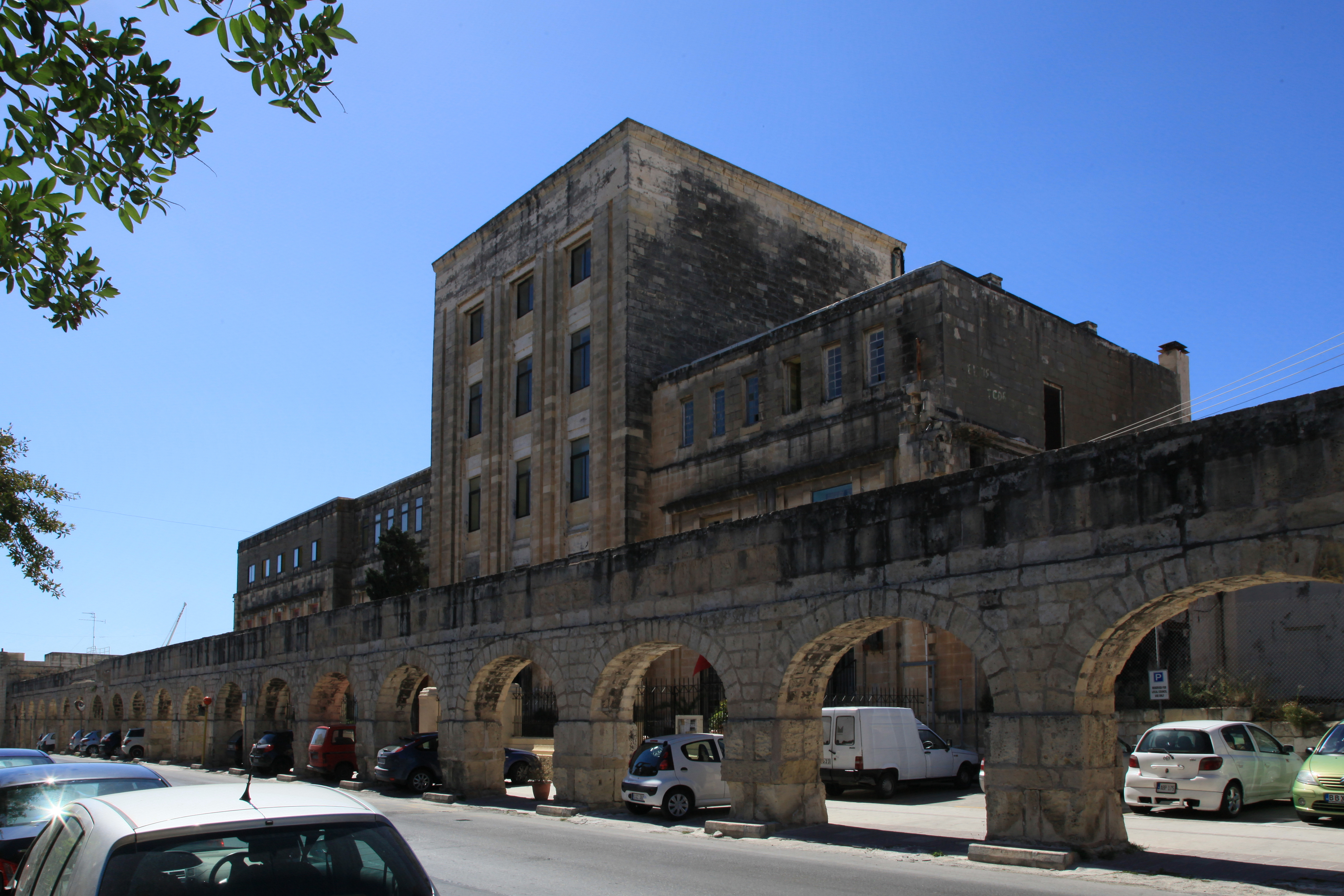
- Town hall and part of the Wignacourt Aqueduct at Santa Venera

- Flag Coat of arms
- Motto: Virtus in infirmitatate per fictur
- Coordinates: 35°53′23″N 14°28′40″E
- Country: Malta
- Region: Central Region
- District: Northern Harbour District
- Borders: Birkirkara, Ħamrun, Msida, Qormi

Government
  - Mayor: Gianluca Falzon (PL)

Area
  - Total: 0.9 km^{2} (0.35 sq mi)

Population (Jul. 2024)
  - Total: 9,762
  - Density: 11,000/km^{2} (28,000/sq mi)
- Demonym(s): Vendriż (m), Vendriża (f), Vendriżi (pl); Vendrin (m), Vendrina (f), Vendrini (pl)
- Time zone: UTC+1 (CET)
  - Summer (DST): UTC+2 (CEST)
- Postal code: SVR
- Dialing code: 356
- ISO 3166 code: MT-54
- Patron saint: St. Venera
- Day of festa: Last Sunday of July and 14 November
- Website: Official website

Santa Venera is a town in the Central Region of Malta. It is located between the towns of Birkirkara and Hamrun, and also borders Qormi and Msida.

The population of Santa Venera was 9,762 in July 2024. This included 5,094 males and 4,668 females; 7,088 Maltese nationals and 2,674 foreign nationals.

== History ==
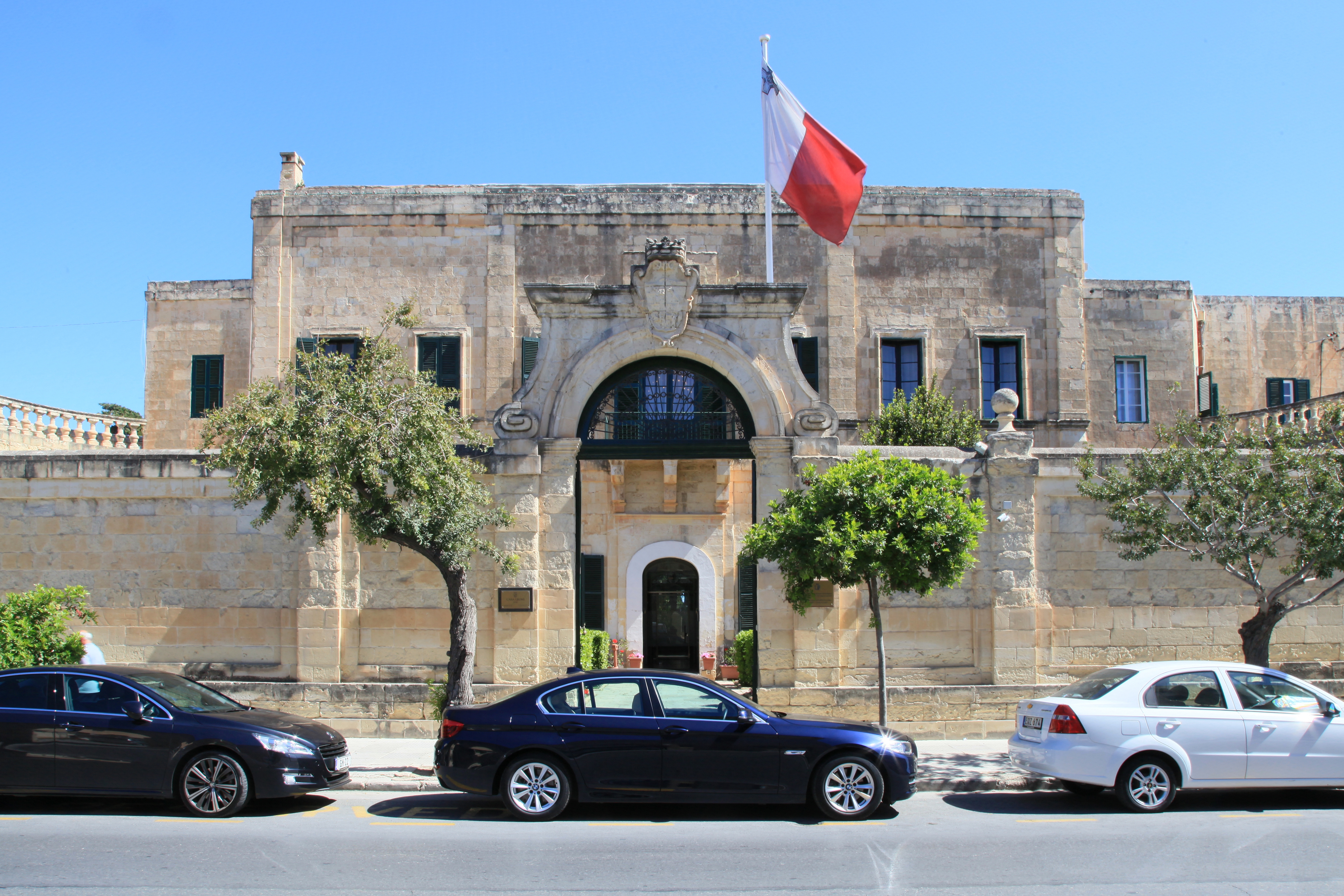
Casa Leoni

The Old Church of Santa Venera was built in 1473, and enlarged in 1500, rebuilt between 1658 and 1688 and again in the 19th century. It remained the parish church until 1989. A new church was consecrated in 2005.

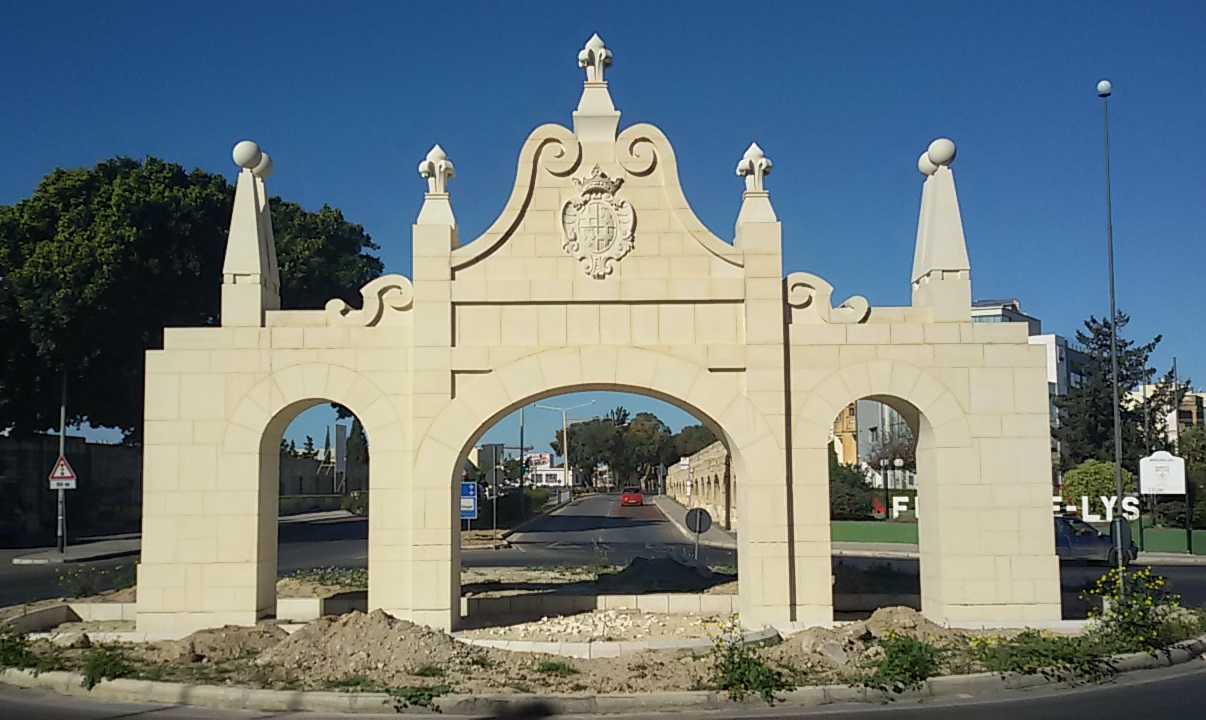
The reconstructed Wignacourt Arch

In 1610, Grandmaster Alof de Wignacourt financed the building of the Wignacourt Aqueduct to transport water from springs in Rabat and Dingli to the capital Valletta, passing through various towns along the way including Santa Venera. The aqueduct was finished in 1615, and an ornamental gateway built where it crossed the road between what is now Fleur-de-Lys and Santa Venera. The arches stopped at a tower known as it-Turretta (the Turret) also known as Tower Guard, also in Santa Venera. From this tower, water continued its journey to Hamrun, Blata l-Bajda, Floriana and Valletta through underground pipes.

Casa Leoni, also known as Palazzo Manoel, was built around 1730 during the reign of António Manoel de Vilhena. Its design is attributed to Charles François de Mondion, the French military engineer who also designed Mdina Gate and parts of Fort Manoel. During the French blockade, Casa Leoni served as a Maltese insurgent command base, and it later served as a residence of Governors of Malta, a depository of the Museums Department and a government primary school. It now houses the Ministry for Sustainable Development, the Environment and Climate Change. The palace has a large garden behind it, part of which was opened to the public in 1977 as Romeo Romano Gardens.

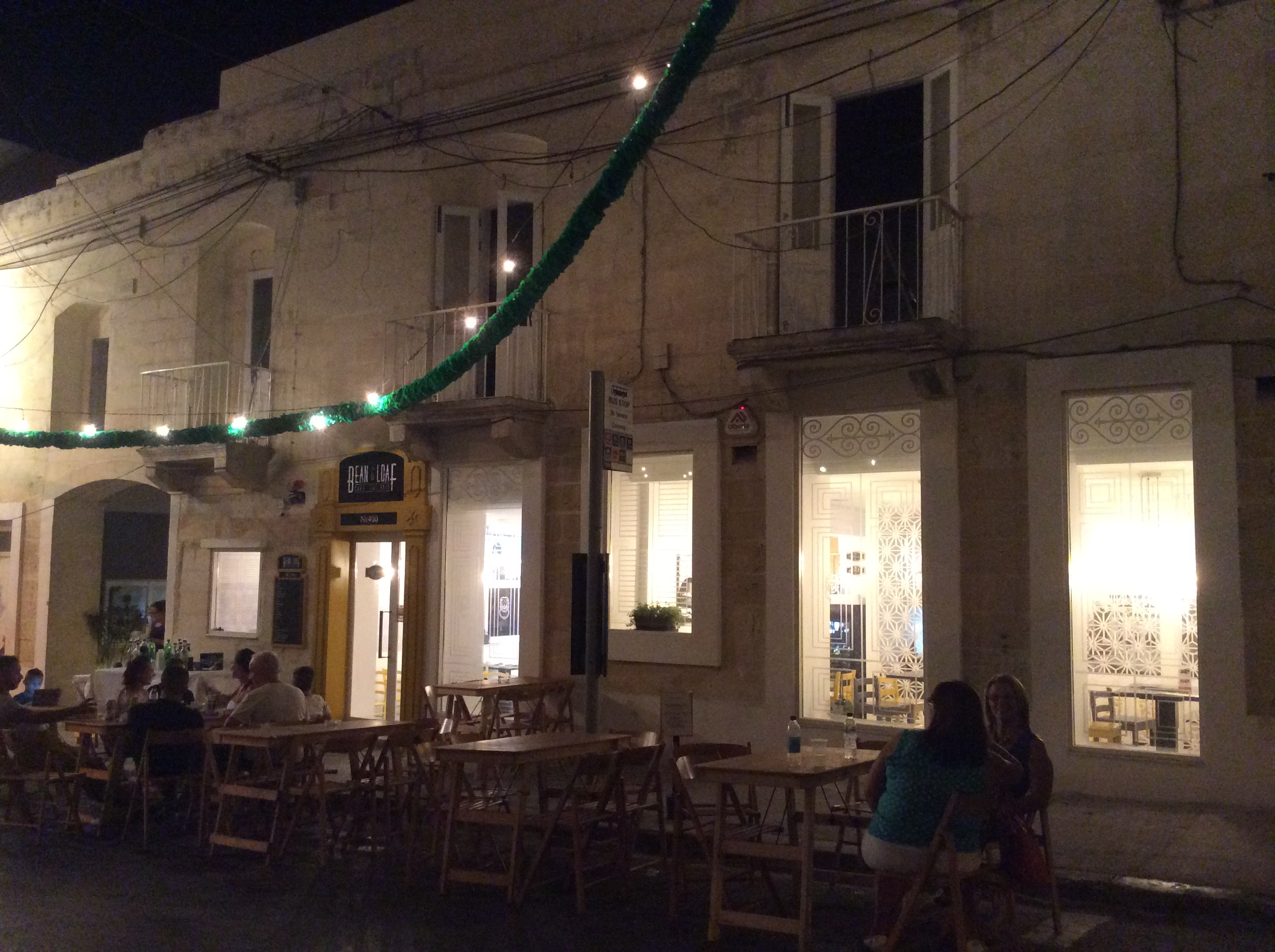
Former 7 Up factory, now multipurpose shops, restaurants and apartments

In the late 19th and early 20th centuries, the town of Santa Venera saw more development and various churches and institutes were built. The town was considered as part of Birkirkara until 1912, and became a separate parish six years later in 1918.

A 7 Up factory was located at Santa Venera until it was closed in 2002. The factory was demolished to make way for flats but the façades of the buildings were retained.

In 1990, a large church began to be built in Santa Venera. Although it is still unfinished as the belfries have not yet been built, it was consecrated in 2005 as the new parish church.

== Symbols ==
The flag and coat of arms of Santa Venera are red with a white stripe in the middle and three red fleur-de-lys on the stripe, taken from the coat of arms of the Grandmaster Alof de Wignacourt who ruled the islands from 1601 to 1622. The flag was introduced when Malta's local councils were created in 1993.

== Education ==
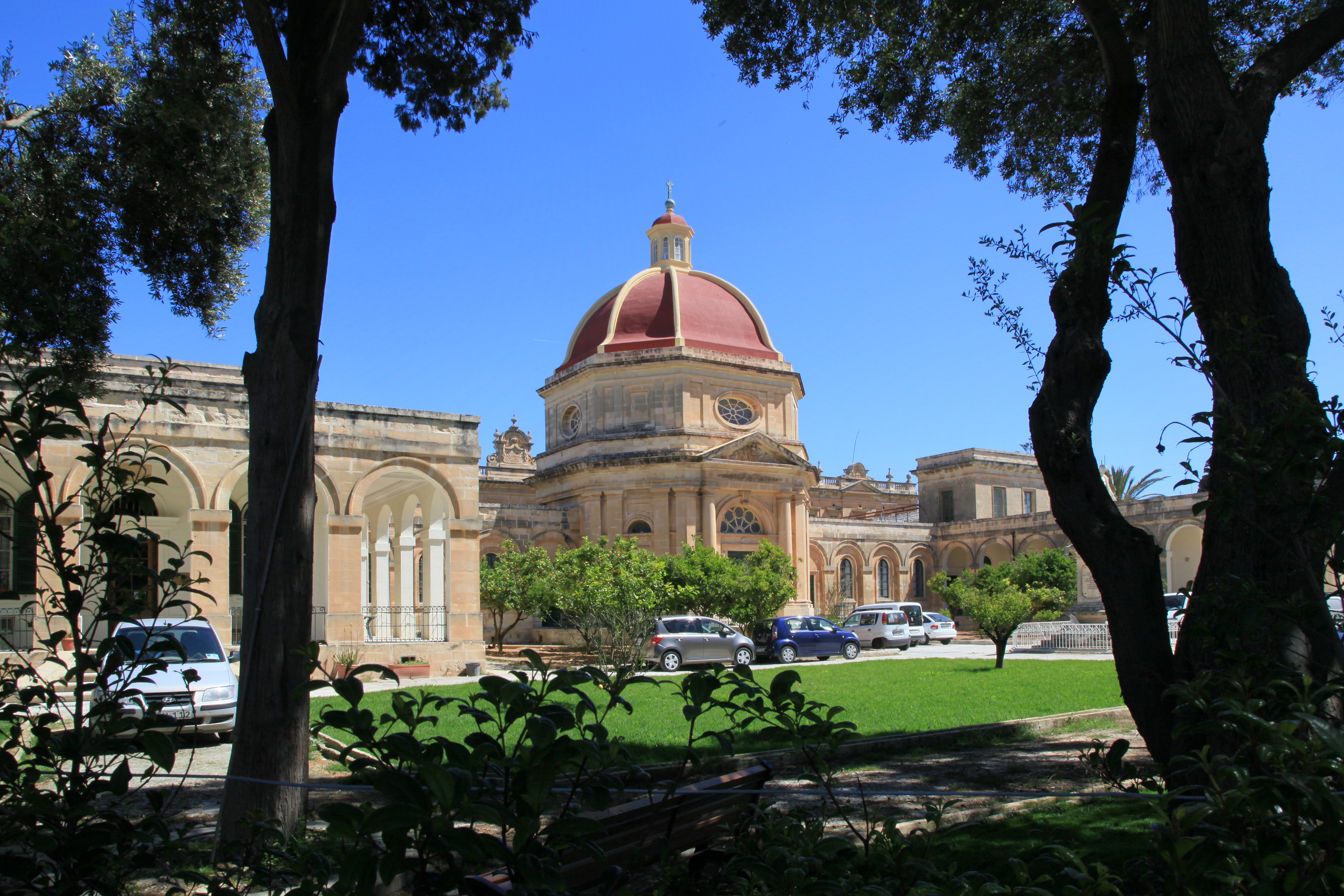
Vincenzo Bugeja Conservatory and Chapel of St Vincent

Santa Venera has a number of educational institutions which include the following:

- Saint Elias College a Catholic secondary school run by the Carmelite Friars. Its mission statement is to form a learning community where each individual is considered to be a child of God. Within a family framework, each individual has a unique value, irrespective of capabilities and achievements. In this manner, each individual can attain full growth through experiences which are academic, athletic, religious, creative, cultural and social.
- St Michael's College, a Catholic secondary school run by the Society of Christian Doctrine;
- Vincenzo Bugeja Conservatory;
- Dun Xand Cortis.

== Organizations ==
- St. Venera Band Club (Soċjeta' Filarmonika Santa Venera V.M. 1964)
- Kummissjoni Zghazagh Palmisti Santa Venera V.M. A.D. 1994
- Kumitat Festi Esterni Parrocca Santa Venera V.M - A.D.1971
- St.Venera United Youth Football Nursery
- Ghaqda tan-Nar 26 ta' Lulju - A.D 2009
- St. Venera Lightnings Football Club
- St. Venera Scout Group
- St. Venera Girl Guides

== Main roads ==
- Triq il-Ferrovija (Railway Road)
- Triq il-Kanun (Canon Road)
- Triq il-Kappillan Mifsud (Parish Priest Mifsud Street)
- Triq il-Kbira San Ġużepp (St Joseph High Road)
- Triq Reġjonali (Regional Road)

== Zones in Santa Venera ==
- Tal-Palazz l-Aħmar
- Hal Kaprat

== Gieħ Santa Venera ==
This is an award given every year to personalities who have left a mark in the locality of Santa Venera. In 2016, the award was given to ALS Malta founder, Bjorn Formosa M.Q.R. Previous winners include Mario Coleiro and Mario Calleja.

== Twin towns – sister cities ==
Santa Venera is twinned with:

- Orvieto, Italy
- Barbazan, France
- Santa Venerina, Italy
