= List of people with breast cancer =

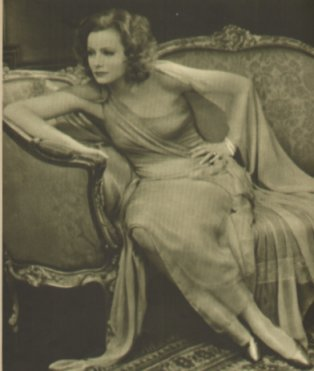
Actress Greta Garbo was a breast cancer patient

This list of notable people with breast cancer includes people who made significant contributions to their chosen field and who were diagnosed with breast cancer at some point in their lives, as confirmed by public information. Diagnosis dates are listed where the information is known.

Breast cancer is the second most common cancer in women after skin cancer. According to the United States National Cancer Institute, the rate of new cases of female breast cancer was 129.1 per 100,000 women per year. The death rate was 19.9 per 100,000 women per year. These rates are age-adjusted and based on 2014–2018 cases and 2015–2019 deaths. Approximately 12.9 percent of women will be diagnosed with female breast cancer at some point during their lifetime, based on 2016–2018 data. In 2018, there were an estimated 3,676,262 women living with female breast cancer in the United States. According to the United States National Cancer Institute, an estimated 321,910 new cases and 42,140 deaths (females only; no estimates for male victims due to size of sampling pool) would occur in the United States in 2026.

== Acting, directing, and filmmaking ==
Name	Life	Comments	Diagnosis	Reference
Kaye Abad	(1982–present)	Filipino actress	diagnosed in 2025 at age 43	
Josephine Abady	(1949–2002)	American stage director, film director, and producer; died at age 52		
Inga Abel	(1946–2000)	German actress; died at age 53		
Aisha Abimbola	(1970–2018)	Nigerian actress; died at age 47		
Christina Applegate	(1971–present)	American Emmy Award-winning actress	diagnosed in 2008 at age 37	
Luana Anders	(1938–1996)	American actress; died at age 58		
Sólveig Anspach	(1960–2015)	Icelandic-born French film director and screenwriter; died at age 54		
Erica Ash	(1977–2024)	American actress, comedian, singer, and model; died at age 46	diagnosed in 2008, cancer recurred in 2018	
Dame Eileen Atkins	(1934–present)	British BAFTA, Emmy, and Olivier award-winning actress	diagnosed in 1995 at age 61	
Fay Baker	(1917–1987)	American actress and novelist; died at age 70		
Jeanne Bal	(1928–1996)	American actress and model; died at age 67		
Brigitte Bardot	(1934–2025)	French actress and animal rights activist		
Marie-Christine Barrault	(1944-present)	French actress		
Ali Bastian	(1982-present)	English actress	diagnosed in 2024 at age 42	
Alexandra Bastedo	(1946–2014)	British model and actress; died at age 67		
Jeanne Bates	(1918–2007)	American actress; died at age 89		
Kathy Bates	(1948-present)	Academy Award-winning American actress; also survived ovarian cancer and battling lymphedema	diagnosed in 2012 at age 64	
Pat Battle	(1959-present)	American television journalist and news anchor	diagnosed in 2010	
Frances Bavier	(1902–1989)	American actress; died at age 86 from congestive heart failure, myocardial infarction, coronary artery disease and atherosclerosis, with breast cancer being a supporting factor		
Meredith Baxter	(1947-present)	American actress	diagnosed in 1999 at age 52	
Allyce Beasley	(1951–present)	American actress	diagnosed in 1998 at age 44	
Valérie Benguigui	(1961–2013)	French actress and theater director; died at age 47		
Ingrid Bergman	(1915–1982)	Academy Award-winning Swedish actress; died at age 67		
Juliet Berto	(1947–1990)	French actress, director, and screenwriter; died at age 42		
Bibi Besch	(1942–1996)	Austrian-American actress; died at age 54		
Aisha Bicknell	(1971–present)	daughter of British actress Rita Tushingham	diagnosed in April 2005 at age 33	
Shirley Temple Black	(1926–2014)	American actress and U.S. Ambassador to Ghana and Czechoslovakia; died from chronic obstructive pulmonary disease at age 85	diagnosed in 1972 at age 46	
Patricia Blair	(1933–2013)	American actress; died at age 80		
Carina Bleeth	(1942–1989)	American model and mother of actress Yasmine Bleeth; died of inflammatory breast cancer at age 47	diagnosed in 1988 at age 46	
Yelena Bondarchuk	(1962–2009)	Soviet and Russian actress; died at age 47		
Eileen Brennan	(1932–2013)	American actress and singer; survived breast cancer but later died at age 80 of bladder cancer		
Mariana Briski	(1965–2014)	born Mariana Marcela Briski, Argentine actress	diagnosed in 2004, later spread to her lungs; died at age 48	
Coral Browne	(1913–1991)	Australian-born American actress; died at age 77		
Heidi Brühl	(1942–1991)	German actress; died at age 49		
Janice Burgess	(1952–2024)	American television writer, producer, and executive	diagnosed in 2018; died at age 72	
Malandra Burrows	(1965–present)	born Malandra Elizabeth Newman, English actress and singer	diagnosed in 2022 at age 56	
Analí Cabrera	(1959–2011)	born Ana Luisa Cabrera Villarreal, also known as "Chelita", Peruvian actress, vedette, athlete, and dancer; died at age 52		
Anna Calder-Marshall	(1947–present)	English actress		
Beverley Callard	(1957–present)	English actress	diagnosed in 2026 at age 68	
Vanessa Bell Calloway	(1957–present)	American actress	diagnosed in 2009	
Anita Carey	(1948–2023)	British actress (Coronation Street, Doctors); died at age 75	diagnosed in 2010	
Diahann Carroll	(1935–2019)	born Carol Diann Johnson, American Oscar-nominated actress and singer	originally diagnosed in 1997 at age 62, Carroll died of a recurrence of the disease in 2019 at age 84	
Debra Chasnoff	(1957–2017)	American documentary filmmaker and activist	diagnosed in 2015; died at age 60	
Mahima Chaudhry	(1973–present)	Indian actress	diagnosed in 2022 at age 49	
Lois Chiles	(1947–present)	American actress and fashion model		
Melanie Clark Pullen	(1975–2022)	Irish actress, film producer and writer; died at age 46 following battle with breast cancer and diagnosis of a brain tumour; it is unclear if the two cancers were related	diagnosed in 2019 at age 44	
Linda Cook	(1948–2012)	American actress; died from undisclosed causes	diagnosed in 1992	
Sara Coward	(1948–2017)	English actress and writer; died at age 69	diagnosed in 2013 at age 65	
Yvonne Craig	(1937-2015)	American actress; died at age 78	diagnosed in 2013 at age 76	
Norma Crane	(1928–1973)	American actress; died at age 44		
Charlotte Cushman	(1816–1876)	American thespian; died at age 59		
Janet Davies	(1927–1986)	English actress (Dad's Army); died at age 59		
Bette Davis	(1908–1989)	American Oscar-winning actress; died at age 81	diagnosed in 1983 at age 75	
Linda Day	(1938–2009)	American television director; died in 2009 at age 71 after battling leukemia and breast cancer		
Ruby Dee	(1922–2014)	born Ruby Ann Wallace, American Oscar-nominated actress; died in 2014 from natural causes	diagnosed in 1970 at 48	
Shelagh Delaney	(1938–2011)	English dramatist and screenwriter; died at age 72		
Thérèse DePrez	(1965–2017)	American production designer; died at age 52		
Marilou Diaz-Abaya	(1955–2012)	Filipino award-winning film director; died at age 57		
Shannen Doherty	(1971–2024)	American Saturn-nominated actress	diagnosed in 2015 at age 44; died at age 53	
Gail Dolgin	(1945–2010)	American documentary filmmaker; died at age 65		
Diana Douglas	(1923–2015)	born Diana Love Dill, British-American actress; first wife of American actor Kirk Douglas and mother of American actor Michael Douglas; died of an undisclosed form of cancer in 2015, aged 92	diagnosed in mid-1990s	
Regina Dourado	(1952–2012)	Brazilian actress; died at age 52		
Carmen Duncan	(1942–2019)	Australian actress; died at age 76		
Sally Dynevor	(1963–present)	British actress	diagnosed in 2009 at age 46	
Julie Ege	(1943–2008)	Norwegian actress and model; died at age 64		
Jill Eikenberry	(1947–present)	American actress	diagnosed in 1986 at age 39	
Victoria Ekanoye	(1981–present)	English actress	diagnosed in 2021 at age 39	
Belinda Emmett	(1974–2006)	Australian actress; had a recurrence in 2001; died November 11, 2006, at age 32	diagnosed in 1998 at age 24	
Andrea Evans	(1957–2023)	American actress; died at age 66	diagnosed in 2011 at age 54	
Edie Falco	(1963–present)	American actress	diagnosed in 2003 at age 40	
Sally Farmiloe	(1948–2014)	South Africa-born British actress; died at age 66		
Jenna Fischer	(1974–present)	American actress		
Danielle Fishel	(1981-present)	American actress	diagnosed in 2024 at age 43	
Lesley Fitz-Simons	(1961–2013)	Scottish actress; died at age 51	diagnosed in 2009 at age 48	
Jane Fonda	(1937–present)	American activist and retired actress	diagnosed in 2010 at age 73	
Wenche Foss	(1917–2011)	Norwegian actress; survived breast cancer; died at age 93		
Karen Fraction	(1958–2007)	American actress, dancer, and model; died aged 49		
Kay Francis	(1905–1968)	born Katherine Edwina Gibbs, American actress, died at age 63	diagnosed in 1966 at age 61	
Maria Friedman	(1960–present)	British actress and singer	diagnosed in 2005 at age 45	
Helen Gahagan	(1900–1980)	American actress turned politician; died at age 80	diagnosed in 1972 at age 72; recurred in 1976	
Greta Garbo	(1905–1990)	born Greta Lovisa Gustafsson, Swedish-American Oscar-nominated actress; survived breast cancer following a double mastectomy; causes of death were kidney and stomach failure along with pneumonia; died in 1990 at age 84	diagnosed in 1984 at age 79	
Rebekah Gibbs	(1973–2014)	English actress; died at age 41		
Louan Gideon	(1955–2014)	American actress and musician; died at age 58		
Liza Goddard	(1950–present)	English actress		
Paulette Goddard	(1910–1990)	born Marion Levy, American Oscar-nominated actress; survived breast cancer, but died at age 79 following a brief battle with emphysema	diagnosed in 1975 at age 65	
Gloria Grahame	(1923-1981)	born Gloria Penelope Hallward, American actress	diagnosed in 1974 at age 50	died at age 58 of stomach cancer and peritonitis
Vanessa Greene	(1954–2017)	British-American television producer and screenwriter; died at age 63		
Linda Griffiths	(1953–2014)	Canadian actress and playwright; died at age 57		
Alvaleta Guess	(1955–1996)	American actress and singer; died at age 40		
Namrata Singh Gujral	(1976–present)	American actress; later developed lymphoma in 2013 due to effects of prior chemotherapy	diagnosed in 2008 at age	
Khrystyne Haje	(1968–present)	American actress and businessperson		
Alaina Reed Hall	(1946–2009)	American actress and singer; died at age 63		
Florence Halop	(1923–1986)	American actress; died at age 63 of lung cancer believed to have metastasized from her original breast cancer		
Kipp Hamilton	(1934–1981)	American actress; died at age 45		
Jane Hamsher	(1959–present)	American film producer, author, and liberal blogger		
Dame Sheila Hancock	(1933–present)	British actress	diagnosed in 1988 at age 55	
Julie Harris	(1925-2013)	American multi-Tony Award-winning and Oscar-nominated actress; died at age 87 in 2013 following a series of strokes	diagnosed in 1981 at age 56	
Marica Hase	(1981–present)	Japanese gravure model and adult actress	diagnosed in 2018 at age 37	
Grace Helbig	(1985–present)	American comedian, actress and internet personality		
Sabina Higgins	(1941–present)	Irish actress, political activist, and wife of former President of Ireland Michael D. Higgins		
Jacqueline Hill	(1929–1993)	British actress; died at age 63		
Judy Holliday	(1921–1965)	American actress, singer and comedian; died at age 43		
Karina Huff	(1961–2016)	British actress, showgirl and television personality; died at age 55		
Olivia Hussey	(1951–2024)	born Olivia Osuna, British actress; died at age 73		
Diana Hyland	(1936–1977)	born Diane Gentner, American actress; died at age 41	diagnosed in 1975	
Jill Ireland	(1936–1990)	British actress; died at age 54	diagnosed in 1984 at age 48	
Kate Jackson	(1948–present)	American actress; survived a recurrence in 1989 at age 41	diagnosed in 1987 at age 39	
Ann Jillian	(1950–present)	born Ann Jura Nauseda, American actress and entertainer	diagnosed in 1985 at age 35	
Jennifer Jones	(1919–2009)	born Phylis Lee Isley, American Oscar-winning actress; died at age 90 from natural causes		
Helen Kane	(1904–1966)	American actress and singer; died at age 62		
Tzeni Karezi	(1934–1992)	Greek actress; died at age 58		
June Keithley	(1947–2013)	Filipino actress, journalist, and activist; died at age 66		
Dorothea Kent	(1916–1990)	American film actress; died at age 74		
Anne Kirkbride	(1954–2015)	British actress; died in 2015 at age 60		
Rosalind Knight	(1933–2020)	British actress; died in 2020 at age 87		
Mao Kobayashi	(1982–2017)	Japanese actress and television presenter; died at age 34		
Sylva Koscina	(1933–1994)	Yugoslav-born Italian actress; died at age 61		
Gabriela Kownacka	(1952–2010)	Polish film and television actress; died at age 58		
Joi Lansing	(1929–1972)	American actress and model; died at age 43		
Barbara Loden	(1932–1980)	American actress, model and theatre director; died at age 48		
Lorna Luft	(1952–present)	American actress and singer		
Amanda Mealing	(1967–present)	English actress, director, and producer		
Hayley Mills	(1946–present)	English actress		
Koh Chieng Mun	(1960–present)	Singaporean actress		
Cheryl Ladd	(1951-present)	American actress and singer	revealed diagnosis in 2026 at age 74	
Sandra Lee	(1966–present)	American television chef and author		
Rachael Lillis	(1969–2024)	American voice actress and screenwriter; died at age 55	diagnosed in 2024 at age 54	
Lar Park Lincoln	(1961–2025)	American actress; died at age 63	diagnosed in 2008 at age 47	
Sacheen Littlefeather	(1946–2022)	American model who attained notoriety when she delivered Marlon Brando's Oscar rejection speech in 1973; died at age 75		
Sondra Locke	(1944–2018)	American actress and director; died from cardiac arrest related to breast and bone cancers; died at age 74		
Victoria Longley	(1960–2010)	Australian actress; died at age 49		
Julia Louis-Dreyfus	(1961-present)	American actress and comedian		
Myrna Loy	(1905–1993)	born Myrna Adele Williams, American actress; had mastectomies in 1975 and 1979, but died during surgery for undisclosed causes; died at age 88	diagnosed in 1975 at age 70	
Ruth Maleczech	(1939–2013)	American actress; died from breast cancer and chronic obstructive pulmonary disease at age 74		
Tyler Mane	(1966–present)	Canadian actor and professional wrestler; publicly revealed diagnosis in June 2026		
Linda Kay Manns	(1965–2008)	American model and businesswoman; died at age 43		
Maja Maranow	(1961–2016)	German actress; died at age 54		
Vera Maretskaya	(1906–1978)	Soviet and Russian actress and gourmand; died at age 72		
Arlene Martel	(1936–2014)	American actress and dancer; died at age 78 primary due to complications from coronary artery bypass surgery but had been battling breast cancer during the last five years of her life		
Jan Maxwell	(1956–2018)	Drama Desk Award-winning American actress and singer; died at age 61 from meningitis complicated by breast cancer		
Rue McClanahan	(1934–2010)	American Emmy Award-winning actress; reportedly treated successfully and in remission but died in 2010 at age 76 after suffering a stroke and a subsequent brain hemorrhage	diagnosed in 1997 at age 63	
Helen McCrory	(1968–2021)	English actress (Peaky Blinders, Harry Potter, Skyfall, The Queen, Doctor Who); died at age 52		
Hattie McDaniel	(1893–1952)	Academy Award-winning American actress; first African-American to win an Academy Award; died at age 57		
William McGhee	(1930–2007)	American actor, also suffered from colon and prostate cancer throughout his life; died at age 76		
Amanda Mealing	(1967–present)	British actress	diagnosed in August 2002 at age 35	
Sylvia Millecam	(1956–2001)	Dutch actress and comedian; died at age 45		
Charlotte Mitchell	(1926–2012)	English actress and poet. She died at age 85 rom pneumonia, after previously suffering from breast cancer and myeloma		
Yūko Mizutani	(1964–2016)	Japanese actress, voice artist, narrator and singer; died at age 51		
Mary Ann Mobley	(1937–2014)	American actress, television personality and Miss America (1959); died at age 77		
Karen Montgomery	(1949–2015)	American actress and film producer; died at age 66		
Shelley Morrison	(1936–2019)	born Rachel Mitrani, American actress; had a recurrence in 1998 and also battled lung cancer; died at age 83 of heart failure in 2019	diagnosed in 1988 at age 52	
Laila Morse	(1945–present)	English actress		
Kitten Natividad	(1948–2022)	born Francesca Isabel Natividad, Mexican actress and model; died of kidney failure at age 74	diagnosed in 1999 at age 51	
Alla Nazimova	(1879–1945)	born Marem-Ides (Adelaida Yakovlevna) Leventon, Russian-born American actress; survived breast cancer, but died due to a coronary thrombosis at age 66	diagnosed in 1936 at age 57	
Phyllis Newman	(1933–2019)	American Tony Award-winning actress and singer; died from a lung disorder.	diagnosed in 1983 at age 50	
Natalie Ng	(1974–2026)	Hong Kong actress; died at age 51		
Cynthia Nixon	(1966–present)	American actress and activist	diagnosed in 2006 at age 40	
Tig Notaro	(1971–present)	born Mathilde O'Callaghan Notaro, American comedian and actress	diagnosed in 2012 at 41	
Kim Novak	(1933–present)	American actress		
Nutan	(1936–1991)	born Nutan Samarth, Indian actress; died at age 54	diagnosed in 1990, aged 53	
Eilish O'Carroll	(1952–present)	Irish actress, writer, and comedian		
Elizabeth Owens	(1928–2005)	German-born American stage actress; died at age 77		
Dame Elaine Paige	(1945–present)	English actress and singer		
Sarah Parkinson	(1962–2003)	British actress, writer and television and radio producer; died at age 41		
Heather Peace	(1975–present)	English actress and singer		
Susan Peretz	(1940–2004)	American actress; died at age 64		
Patrícia Pillar	(1964–present)	Brazilian actress	diagnosed in 2001	
Kelly Preston	(1962–2020)	born Kelly Kamalelehua Smith, American actress and model	diagnosed in 2018; died in 2020 at age 57	
Nancy Priddy	(1941–present)	American retired actress and singer-songwriter; mother of American actress Christina Applegate	diagnosed in 1978; recurrence in 1986	
Kay Purcell	(1963–2020)	English actress; died at age 57 from breast and liver cancer as a result of metastasis		
Giuliana Rancic	(1974–present)	Italian-American television personality and infotainer		
Lynn Redgrave	(1943–2010)	British-American Golden Globe Award-winning and Oscar-nominated actress; died at age 67	diagnosed in 2002 at age 59	
Alma Reville	(1899–1982)	Alma Lucy Reville, Lady Hitchcock, English-born American assistant film director, actress, and wife of film director Alfred Hitchcock; died of natural causes at age 82		
Wendy Richard	(1943–2009)	born Wendy Emerton, British actress; had a recurrence in 2002 at age 59, third recurrence in 2008, at which point it had metastasized; died at age 65	diagnosed in 1995 at age 52	
Gina Riley	(1961–present)	Australian actress and singer		
Crystal-Donna Roberts	(1984–2025)	South African actress, television presenter, and writer (The Endless River, Arendsvlei); died at age 40		
Toby Robins	(1931–1986)	Canadian actress, television personality and journalist; died at age 55		
Krysta Rodriguez	(1984–present)	American actress and singer		
Lorena Rojas	(1971–2015)	Mexican actress and singer-songwriter; died at age 44		
Roxie Roker	(1929–1995)	American actress and mother of singer-songwriter Lenny Kravitz; died aged 66		
Richard Roundtree	(1942–2023)	American actor; treated successfully for breast cancer but died of pancreatic cancer in 2023 at age 81	diagnosed in 1993 at age 51	
Rosalind Russell	(1907–1976)	American actress and singer; died at age 69		
Jennifer Saunders	(1958–present)	English actress, comedian, and screenwriter.		
Irene Mayer Selznick	(1907–1990)	American socialite and theatrical producer; died aged 83		
Tracy Shaw	(1973–present)	English actress and singer		
Susan Sheridan	(1947–2015)	English actress and voice artist; died at age 68		
Morag Siller	(1969–2016)	Scottish actress, voice artist and radio personality; died at age 46		
Jean Simmons	(1929–2010)	British-American actress; was treated successfully for breast cancer, but later died at age 80 from lung cancer		
Susan Raab Simonson	(1969–2006)	American stage actress and theatre producer; died at age 37		
Jaclyn Smith	(1947–present)	American actress and businesswoman	diagnosed in 2002 at age 55	
Dame Maggie Smith	(1934–2024)	British Oscar, Tony and Emmy award-winning actress	diagnosed in 2008 at age 74; died of undisclosed causes at age 89	
Suzanne Somers	(1946–2023)	born Suzanne Marie Mahoney; American actress and businesswoman; died at age 76	diagnosed in 2001 at age 55	
Danielle Spencer	(1965–2025)	American actress and veterinarian; died from a cardiac arrest caused by an unrelated stomach cancer	Diagnosed in 2014	
Wendie Jo Sperber	(1958–2005)	American actress, founded WeSPARK Cancer Support Center following diagnosis; died at age 46	diagnosed in 1997	
Srividya	(1953–2006)	Indian actress; died at age 53		
Koo Stark	(1956–present)	born Kathleen Norris Stark, American former soft-porn actress and photographer; founded Keep A Breast cancer organization	diagnosed in 2002 at age 46	
Mindy Sterling	(1953–present)	American actress		
Pat Stevens	(1945–2010)	American actress; died aged 64		
Susan Strasberg	(1938–1999)	American actress (The Diary of Anne Frank); died aged 60		
Marcia Strassman	(1948–2014)	American actress and singer; died aged 66		
Gloria Stuart	(1910–2010)	born Gloria Stewart; American Oscar-nominated actress; died in 2010 at age 100 from unrelated causes	diagnosed circa 1982	
Stephanie Swift	(1972–present)	American pornographic film actress and 2006 AVN Hall of Fame inductee	diagnosed in 2009 at age 37	
Joan Sydney	(1936–2022)	English-born Australian actress	diagnosed in 2015	
Wanda Sykes	(1964–present)	American actress, stand-up comedian and writer	diagnosed in 2011 at age 47	
Myfanwy Talog	(1944–1995)	Welsh actress; died aged 50		
Yoshiko Tanaka	(1956–2011)	Japanese actress, member of Candies	diagnosed in 1992 at age 37; died in 2011 at age 55	
Gwen Taylor	(1939–present)	English actress		
Sam Taylor-Johnson	(1967–present)	English filmmaker, director and photographer		
Maura Tierney	(1965-present)	American actress	diagnosed in 2009 at age 44	
Penny Thomson	(1950–2007)	Scottish stage and television director; died aged 56		
Vanessa Trump	(1977–present)	American model and ex-wife of American businessman Donald Trump Jr., eldest child of the 45th and 47th President of the United States Donald Trump	diagnosed in May 2026	
Louise Troy	(1933–1994)	American actress; died aged 60		
Danitra Vance	(1954–1994)	American comedian and actress; died at age 40	diagnosed in 1990 at age 36	
Vivian Vance	(1909–1979)	born Vivian Roberta Jones; American actress and singer; died at age 70 from breast and bone cancer	diagnosed in 1973 at age 64	
Mary Wickes	(1910–1995)	American actress; died at age 85; she suffered from numerous ailments in the last years of her life, including kidney failure, massive gastrointestinal bleeding, severe hypotension and ischemic cardiomyopathy, with contributing causes listed as anemia and breast cancer		
Marcia Wallace	(1942–2013)	American comedic actress, game show panelist, and voice artist; died at age 70 from pneumonia, with breast cancer as a supporting factor	diagnosed in 1985 at age 43	
Liza Wang	(1947-present)	Hong Kong television personality, actress, singer and diva		
Anne Wiazemsky	(1947–2017)	French actress and novelist; died at age 70		
Rita Wilson	(1956-present)	American actress, singer and producer; wife of Tom Hanks	diagnosed in 2015 at 59	
Samantha Womack	(1972–present)	born Samantha Zoe Janus; British actress and singer	diagnosed in 2022 at age 49	
Gretchen Wyler	(1932–2007)	American actress, singer, and dancer		
Chen Xiaoxu	(1965–2007)	Chinese actress and Buddhist nun; died at age 41		
Aleksandra Yakovleva	(1957–2022)	born Aleksandra Evgenievna Ivanes; Soviet and Russian actress, and, later, a Russian rail transport executive and businesswoman; died at age 64	diagnosed in 2017	
Laura Ziskin	(1950–2011)	American film and television producer; died at age 61		

== Business ==
Name	Life	Comments	Diagnosis	Reference
Generosa Ammon	(1956–2003)	Widow of (and one-time suspect in the murder of) American businessman and multimillionaire Ted Ammon; died at age 47	diagnosed in 2002 at age 46	
Mary-Ellis Bunim	(1946–2004)	American film/TV producer; died at age 57	diagnosed in 1995 at age 48	
Nayana Ferguson	(1973-present)	African-American businesswoman; first Black woman to own a tequila company; also survived pancreatic cancer in 2005	diagnosed in 2012	
Fiamma Ferragamo	(1941–1998)	Italian shoe designer and businesswoman; died at age 57	diagnosed in 1989 at age 49	
Carly Fiorina	(1954-present)	American business executive		
Georgia Frontiere	(1927–2008)	American businesswoman and entertainer; died aged 80		
Jacqueline Gold	(1960–2023)	English businesswoman and Chief Executive Officer of Ann Summers; died at age 62		
Anne-Claire Goulon	(1974–2026)	French businesswoman; died at age 51		
Ruth Handler	(1916–2002)	born Ruth Marianna Mosko, American creator of Barbie and Nearly Me breast prosthetics; she survived breast cancer in the 1970s but died following colon cancer surgery at age 85	diagnosed in 1970 at age 54	
Teresa Heinz	(1938-present)	Portuguese-American businesswoman, philanthropist and wife of American politician John Kerry		
Mary Sue Hubbard	(1931–2002)	American businesswoman, religious figure and third wife of L. Ron Hubbard, founder of Dianetics; died at age 71		
Kathy Keeton	(1939–1997)	American Penthouse publisher and wife of Penthouse publisher Bob Guccione; died during surgery from complications after refusing chemotherapy and treating herself with hydrazine sulfate; died at age 58	diagnosed in 1995 at age 56	
Helen Kushnick	(1945–1996)	American talent agent and television producer; died at age 51	diagnosed in 1987 at age 42	
Evelyn Lauder	(1936–2011)	Austrian-American businesswoman, socialite, philanthropist and breast cancer awareness activist; died from ovarian cancer at age 75		
Hala Moddelmog	(1956–present)	American president and CEO of Susan G. Komen for the Cure	diagnosed in 2001 at age 45	

== Miscellaneous ==
Name	Life	Comments	Diagnosis	Reference
Anna Abrikosova	(1882–1936)	Also known as Mother Catherine of Siena, prominent Russian Greek Catholic religious sister		
Phil Alderson	(1971–present)	British male breast cancer survivor and awareness advocate who has worked with Breast Cancer Now, Macmillan Cancer Support, and Future Dreams charities	diagnosed in 2016 at age 44	,
Tun Endon Mahmood Ambak	(1940–2005)	Wife of the 5th Prime Minister of Malaysia, Tun Abdullah Ahmad Badawi; died at age 64. (Her twin sister, Noraini, also died from breast cancer in 2003.)		
Judi Bari	(1949–1997)	American environmentalist and labor leader; died at age 47	diagnosed in 1996 at age 46	
Céline Bellot	(1970–2026)	Canadian criminologist and academic; died at age 55		
Betty Berzon	(1928–2006)	American psychotherapist and lesbian activist; died at age 78		
Audrey Best	(1960–2011)	Montreal-based French lawyer and second wife of Lucien Bouchard; died at age 50		
Maggie Borg	(1952–2004)	Maltese activist for environmental and social rights; died at age 52		
Bimba Bosé	(1975–2017)	Italian-born Spanish model and singer; died at age 41		
Nancy Brinker	(1946–present)	born Nancy Goodman, American breast cancer activist and founder of the Susan G. Komen for the Cure, in honor of her sister	diagnosed in 1984 at age 37	
Michelle Brunner	(1953–2011)	British bridge player, writer and teacher; died at age 57		
Christine Buckley	(1946–2014)	Irish activist and campaigner; died at age 67		
Diana Capponi	(1953–2014)	Canadian mental health activist; died at age 61		
Yvonne Carter	(1959–2009)	British general practitioner and academician; died at age 50		
Rose Chan	(1925–1987)	born Chan Wai Chang, Chinese-born "Queen of Striptease" exotic dancer; died at age 62	diagnosed in 1980 at age 55	
Stephen Philip Cohen	(1945–2017)	American academic and scholar on Middle Eastern affairs; died at age 71		
Cheryl Cohen-Greene	(1944–present)	American sexual surrogate partner, speaker, and author		
Flick Colby	(1946–2011)	American dancer, choreographer and founder member of Pan's People; died from bronchopneumonia at age 65		
Katharine Ellis Coman	(1857–1915)	American social activist and professor	diagnosed in 1911 around age 54; died in 1915, aged 57	
Della Davidson	(1952–2012)	American modern dancer, choreographer and dance professor; died at age 60		
Priscilla Davis	(1942–2001)	American socialite; died at age 59		
Martina Davis-Correia	(1967–2011)	American civil rights and anti-capital punishment activist; died at age 44		
J. D. Disalvatore	(1966–2017)	American LGBT film and television producer/director and gay rights activist; died at age 51		
Sister Dora	(1832–1878)	English nun and nurse; died at age 46		
Amy Dowden	(1990–present)	Welsh professional ballroom and Latin American dancer		
Linda Evangelista	(1965–present)	Canadian supermodel		
Judith Campbell Exner	(1934–1999)	born Judith Eileen Katherine Immoor, John F. Kennedy relationship-related American celebrity; died at age 65	diagnosed in 1978 at age 44	
Sandra Feldman	(1940–2005)	born Sandra Abramowitz, American teacher and union leader (American Federation of Teachers); died at age 65	diagnosed in 2002 at age 62	
Kristina Fetters	(1980–2014)	American convicted murderer; died at age 34		
Jean B. Fletcher	(1915–1965)	American architect; died at age 50		
Saint Lucy Filippini	(1672–1732)	Italian Catholic nun and educator; died at age 69		
Karen Wynn Fonstad	(1945–2005)	American cartographer and academic; died at age 59		
Syvilla Fort	(1917–1975)	African-American dancer and choreographer; died at age 58	diagnosed in 1974 at age 57	
Loie Fuller	(1862–1928)	French-based American dancer and choreographer; died at age 65		
Barbara Gittings	(1932–2007)	American LGBT rights activist; died at age 74		
Fannie R. Givens	(died 1947)	born Fannie Rosalind Hicks, American advocate, policewoman, and artist		
Rosalie Gower	(1931–2013)	Canadian nurse, civil servant and city councillor; survived breast cancer, later died from a stroke		
Beverly Hall	(1946–2015)	American educator; died at age 68		
Kristin Hallenga	(1985–2024)	West German-born British news columnist turned activist for raising awareness about breast cancer who founded the charity CoppaFeel!; died at age 38	diagnosed at age 23	
Fannie Lou Hamer	(1917–1977)	born Fannie Lou Townsend, African-American anti-segregation activist; died at age 59	diagnosed in 1976 at age 58	
Klara Pölzl Hitler	(1860–1907)	Austrian mother of Adolf Hitler; died at age 47		
Anita Hoffman	(1942–1998)	American activist and writer; died at age 56		
Connie Johnson	(1977–2017)	Australian philanthropist; suffered from bone cancer at age 11, uterine cancer at age 22, and finally breast cancer at age 33; died from liver cancer at age 40		
Jean Keene	(1923–2009)	born Jean Marie Hodgdon, rodeo trick rider and "The Eagle Lady" of Homer, Alaska, famous for feeding 200-300 bald eagle daily during winter and early spring months for over 30 years	diagnosed in winter 1994 at age 71; underwent mastectomy; died of a respiratory illness in 2009, at age 85	
Kat Kinkade	(1930–2008)	Co-founder of the Twin Oaks experimental utopian community near Charlottesville, Virginia; died at age 77		
Susan G. Komen	(1944–1980)	born Susan Goodman, American breast cancer activist; sister of Nancy Brinker; died at age 36, namesake of the Susan G. Komen for the Cure organization	diagnosed in 1977 at age 33	
Shari Lewis	(1933–1998)	American ventriloquist, puppeteer, entertainer and singer; survived breast cancer, but later died from uterine cancer at age 65		
Juliette Gordon Low	(1860–1927)	born Juliette Magill Kinzie Gordon, American founder of Girl Scouts of the USA; died at age 67	diagnosed in 1923 at age 63	
Dame Helen Metcalf	(1946–2003)	British educator, academic and politician; died at age 57		
Claire Morissette	(1950–2007)	Quebec-based Canadian activist and cycling advocate; died at age 57		
John W. Nick	(1933–1991)	American male breast cancer patient and activist in whose name The John W. Nick Foundation was established; died at age 58		
Sister Dora Pattison	(1832–1878)	born Dorothy Wyndlow Pattison, Anglican nun and nurse; died at age 46	diagnosed in 1877	
Tatjana Patitz	(1966–2023)	German supermodel and actress; died at age 56		
Ellen Pence	(1948–2012)	American sociologist and social activist against domestic violence; died at age 63		
Nancy M. Petry	(1968–2018)	American psychologist; died at age 49		
Dame Rosemary Rue	(1928–2004)	British physician, civil servant and one-time regional general manager and medical officer of the Oxford Regional Health Authority; died from bowel cancer at age 76		
Ann Marie Rogers	(1952–2009)	British campaigner who won a landmark legal battle against the British NHS to allow people with cancer access to the drug Herceptin; died at age 57		
Ann Romney	(1949–present)	American philanthropist, author and wife of American U.S. senator Mitt Romney; she was diagnosed with mammary ductal carcinoma in situ and had a lumpectomy		
Carolyn Rovee-Collier	(1942–2014)	American psychologist, academic and educator; also suffered from multiple sclerosis; died at age 72		
Eve Kosofsky Sedgwick	(1950–2009)	American academic scholar in gender studies and queer theory; died at age 58		
Naomi Sims	(1948–2009)	American model, businesswoman and author; died at age 61		
Yumiko Shige	(1965–2018)	Japanese sailor; died at age 53		
Abigail Adams Smith	(1765-1813)	Daughter of John Adams and Abigail Adams, older sister to John Quincy Adams. She had a mastectomy performed by John Warren without anesthesia on October 8, 1811.	diagnosed in 1810 died at age 48	
Karin Spaink	(1957–2026)	Dutch journalist, social critic, and feminist; died at age 68	diagnosed at age 48 in 2006	
Athena Starwoman	(1945–2004)	world-famous astrologer, columnist for Vogue and Woman's Day; TV commentator; died at age 59		
Deborah Lynn Steinberg	(1961–2017)	American-British academic, author, educator and sociologist; died at age 55	diagnosed in 2007; recurrence in 2014	
Lynne Stewart	(1939–2017)	born Lynne Irene Feltham, American lawyer and activist; died at age 77	diagnosed in 2005 at age 66	
Jennie Faulding Taylor	(1843–1904)	British Protestant missionary to China; died at age 60		
Jane Tomlinson	(1964–2007)	born Jane Emily Goward, British cancer fundraiser; died at age 43	diagnosed in 1991 with a recurrence in 2000 at age 36 and died in 2007	
Carol Tomlinson-Keasey	(1942–2009)	American psychologist and educator; died at age 66		
Juliette Gordon Low	(1860–1927	American founder of Girl Scouts of the USA; died at age 67		
Cynthia Lufkin	(1962–2013)	American philanthropist, cancer research advocate, and co-chairwoman of The Breast Cancer Research Foundation; died at age 51		
Marie-Azélie Guérin Martin	(1831–1877)	French laywoman and mother of St Thérèse de Lisieux; died at age 45		
Hendrikje van Andel-Schipper	(1890–2005)	Dutch supercentenarian who was the "World's Oldest Person" from May 29, 2004 until her death on August 30, 2005. Successfully treated for breast cancer at the age of 100; later died from an unrelated stomach cancer at age 115		
Mary Ann Coady Weinand	(1959–2007)	American psychiatrist; died at age 47		
Dorothy Wilde	(1895–1941)	Anglo-Irish socialite and niece of Oscar Wilde; died at age 45		

== Music ==
Name	Life	Comments	Diagnosis	Reference
Shammi Akhtar	(1957–2018)	Bangladeshi playback singer; died at age 60		
Chrissy Amphlett	(1959–2013)	Australian musician and actress; died from breast cancer and multiple sclerosis aged 53		
A-Sun	(1975–2009)	Taiwanese Mandopop singer-songwriter; died at age 34	diagnosed in 2008 at age 33	
Anastacia	(1968–present)	born Anastacia Lyn Newkirk, American singer	diagnosed in 2003 at age 34	
Rim Banna	(1966–2018)	Palestinian singer, composer and activist; died at age 51		
Katreese Barnes	(1963–2019)	American musician, musical director, and songwriter; died at age 56		
Rajae Belmlih	(1962–2007)	Moroccan-Emirati singer; died at age 45		
Rachel Bissex	(1956–2005)	American folk singer-songwriter; died at age 48		
Helen Blackwood, Baroness Dufferin and Claneboye	(1807–1867)	Anglo-Irish songwriter, composer, poet, and author; died at age 60		
Blanche Calloway	(1902–1978)	American jazz singer, composer and bandleader; died at age 76		
Phyliss Carr	(1939–2006)	American singer (The Quin-Tones); died at age 66		
Agnes Chan	(1955–present)	Hong Kong-born Japanese singer, television personality, university professor, essayist and novelist	diagnosed in 2007	
Beth Nielsen Chapman	(1958–present)	American singer-songwriter	diagnosed in 2000	
Susan Chilcott	(1963–2003)	English soprano; died age of 40		
Lili Chookasian	(1921–2012)	Armenian-American contralto. She survived breast cancer twice during her lifetime; died from natural causes aged 90		
Odia Coates	(1941–1991)	African-American singer; died at age 49	died following a four-year battle	
Doris Coley	(1941–2000)	African-American singer (one of The Shirelles); died at age 58		
Teresa Cornelys	(c. 1723–1797)	born Anna Maria Teresa Imer, Italian operatic soprano; died in Fleet Prison, London in 1797 at age 73 or 74		
Beverley Craven	(1963–present)	British singer-songwriter ("Promise Me")		
Linda Creed	(1949–1986)	American songwriter; died at age 37	diagnosed at age 26 in 1975	
Peter Criss	(1945–present)	born Peter George Criscuola, American musician	diagnosed at age 62 in 2008	
Sheryl Crow	(1962–present)	American singer/musician	diagnosed in 2006 at age 44	
Tamara Danz	(1952–1996)	born Lenore Tamara Danz, German lead singer and lyricist of the East German rock group Silly	diagnosed in 1995; died the following year at age 43	
Delia Derbyshire	(1937–2001)	English pianist and composer of electronic music; died from kidney failure while recovering from surgery		
Lhasa de Sela	(1972–2010)	Mexican-American-Canadian singer-songwriter; died at age 37		
Anita Doth	(1971–present)	born Anita Daniëlle Dels, Eurodance singer who was part of the Dutch duo 2 Unlimited	diagnosed in 2009 at age 37	
Melissa Etheridge	(1961–present)	American singer/songwriter and lesbian rights activist whose grandmother and aunt died from breast cancer	diagnosed in 2004 at age 43	
Marianne Faithfull	(1946–2025)	British singer/actress	diagnosed in 2006 at age 59	
Kathleen Ferrier	(1912–1953)	English contralto; died at age 41	diagnosed in 1951 at age 38	
Catrin Finch	(1980–present)	Welsh harpist, arranger, composer and former Royal Harpist		
Lola Flores	(1923–1995)	born María Dolores Flores Ruiz, Spanish singer, flamenco dancer, and businesswoman	first diagnosed in diagnosed in 1972; died at age 72	
France Gall	(1947–2018)	French yé-yé singer and winner of the Eurovision Song Contest 1965; died from an infection complicated by cancer of an undisclosed nature		
Nanci Griffith	(1953–2021)	American singer/songwriter	diagnosed in 1996 at age 43	
Kim Gordon	(1953–present)	American musician, vocalist, visual artist, record producer, video director, and fashion designer		
Sarah Harding	(1981–2021)	born Sarah Nicole Hardman, English singer, model, and actress, died at age 39	diagnosed in 2020 at age 38	
Junko Hirotani	(1956–2020)	Japanese singer; died at age 63		
Shirley Horn	(1934–2005)	American jazz singer; also suffered from diabetes and arthritis; died at age 71		
Marsha Hunt	(1946–present)	African-American singer, novelist, breast cancer activist and mother of Mick Jagger's first child, Karis Jagger	diagnosed in 2004 at age 58	
Jessie J	(1988–present)	born Jessica Ellen Cornish, English singer-songwriter	diagnosed in 2025 at age 37	
Floor Jansen	(1981–present)	Dutch metal vocalist	diagnosed in 2022 at age 41	
Jocelyne Jocya	(1942–2003)	French singer-songwriter and children's rights advocate; died at age 61		
Puma Jones	(1953–1990)	American singer; died at age 36		
Kaori Kawamura	(1971–2009)	Soviet-born Japanese pop singer; died at age 38		
Helen Keane	(1923–1996)	American music producer and manager; died at age 73		
Irene Kral	(1932–1978)	American jazz singer; died at age 46	diagnosed in 1972 at age 40	
Pastelle LeBlanc	(1979/1980–2022)	Canadian folk musician; died at age 42	diagnosed in 2020	
Lorraine Hunt Lieberson	(1954–2006)	American mezzo-soprano opera singer; died at age 52; in 2000 her younger sister Alexis also died due to breast cancer	diagnosed in 2000 at age 46	
Linda McCartney	(1941–1998)	born Linda Louise Eastman, American singer, activist, wife of British former Beatles member Sir Paul McCartney; died at age 56	diagnosed in 1995 at age 54	
Susannah McCorkle	(1946–2001)	American jazz singer; survived breast cancer but suffered for many years from clinical depression and committed suicide by jumping off the balcony of her apartment in Manhattan at age 55		
Kylie Minogue	(1968–present)	Australian singer and actress. Sister of Dannii Minogue.	diagnosed in 2005 at age 36	
Anna Moffo	(1932–2006)	Italian-American singer and operatic soprano who died from a stroke after grappling with complications of breast cancer for a decade; died at age 73	diagnosed in 1996	,
Dame Hinewehi Mohi	(1964–present)	New Zealand musician and producer	diagnosed in 2011	
Charlotte Moorman	(1933–1991)	American cellist and performance artist; died at age 57	diagnosed in the late 1970s in her 40s	
Phyllis Nelson	(1950–1998)	American singer; died at age 47		
Dame Olivia Newton-John	(1948–2022)	British-Australian singer, actress and activist; died at age 73	diagnosed in 1992 at age 44	
Nightbirde	(1990–2022)	stage name of Jane Kristen Marczewski, American singer-songwriter; died at age 31		
Marni Nixon	(1930–2016)	American ghost singer, soprano, voice artist and actress; died at age 86		
Bernie Nolan	(1960–2013)	Irish singer, actress, television personality and former member of the 1970s pop band, The Nolans; died at age 52	diagnosed in 2010 at age 49	
Linda Nolan	(1959–2025)	Irish singer, actress and former member of the 1970s pop band, The Nolans; died at age 65 from double pneumonia secondary to breast cancer that had metastasised to her brain, pelvis, and liver	diagnosed in 2006 at age 46	
Screechy Peach	(1959–2007)	American singer-songwriter; died at age 47		
Minnie Pearl	(1912–1996)	born Sarah Ophelia Colley, American Grand Ole Opry star, country comic, singer and philanthropist who survived breast cancer but died in 1996 of complications from a stroke; died at age 83	diagnosed in 1985 at age 73	
Raylene Rankin	(1960–2012)	Canadian singer (The Rankin Family); died at age 52		
Sandra Reemer	(1950–2017)	Indo-Dutch singer and television presenter; died at age 66		
Rita Reys	(1924–2013)	Dutch jazz singer who received the title of "Europe's First Lady of Jazz" at the 1960 French Jazz Festival of Juan-les-Pins; died from a stroke at age 88		
Minnie Riperton	(1947–1979)	American singer-songwriter	diagnosed in 1976 at age 29	
Poly Styrene	(1957–2011)	born Marianne Joan Elliott-Said, British singer	treated for breast cancer, which spread to her spine and lungs; died at age 53	
Calypso Rose	(1940–present)	Tobagonian calypso musician		
Tara Simmons	(1984–2019)	Australian musician		
Carly Simon	(1945–present)	American singer	diagnosed in 1998 at age 53	
Lucy Simon	(1940–2022)	American singer and composer; died at age 82		
Katarzyna Sobczyk	(1945–2010)	Polish singer; died aged 65		
Soraya	(1969–2006)	born Soraya Raquel Lamilla Cuevas, Colombian-American singer/songwriter and breast cancer advocate; her mother (Yamila Cuevas Gharib; (1941–1992)), aunt, and grandmother also died due to breast cancer; died at age 37	diagnosed in 2000 at age 31	
Dusty Springfield	(1939–1999)	born Mary Isobel Catherine Bernadette O'Brien, British songwriter/singer; died at age 59	diagnosed in 1994 at age 54	
Kaye Stevens	(1932–2011)	American singer and actress; died at age 79		
Ruth Ann Swenson	(1963–present)	American operatic soprano	diagnosed in 2006 at age 43	
Dame Jools Topp	(1958–2026)	born Julie Bethridge Topp, New Zealand folk singer and activist (one of the Topp Twins); died at age 68	diagnosed in 2006 at age 48	
Dame Lynda Topp	(1958–present)	born Lynda Bethridge Topp, New Zealand folk singer and activist; one of the Topp Twins	diagnosed in 2006 at age 48	
Tatiana Troyanos	(1938–1993)	American operatic mezzo-soprano; died at age 54	diagnosed in the mid-1980s and later in remission; found in July 1993 to have metastasized to her liver	
Dawn Upshaw	(1960–present)	American operatic soprano diva	diagnosed in 2006 at age 46	
Linda Waterfall	(1950–2019)	American singer-songwriter; survived breast cancer but died at age 69 following an undisclosed long illness		
Yao Beina	(1981–2015)	Chinese singer-songwriter		

== Politics and government ==
Name	Life	Comments	Diagnosis	Reference
Bella Abzug	(1920–1998)	born Bella Savitsky, American politician, lawyer, and women's movement leader; battled breast cancer for years before developing heart disease, which claimed her life; it was never publicly disclosed if the cancer had metastasized; died at age 77	diagnosed in 1994 at age 73	
Judith Adams	(1943–2012)	born Judith Anne Bird, New Zealand-born Australian politician, midwife, nurse, and farmer; died at age 68	diagnosed with first-stage breast cancer in 1998, and secondary breast cancer in 2008; died in 2012	
Barbara Allen	(1961–present)	American politician, Kansas State Senator	diagnosed in 2005	
Asma al-Assad	(1975-present)	Former First Lady of Syria from 2000 to 2024. Wife of ousted former President Bashar al-Assad. Survived breast cancer a year after her diagnosis.	diagnosed in 2018	
Rose Bird	(1936–1999)	American judge, first female Chief Justice of California, and the first/only (to date) Chief Justice in California history to lose a retention election; died at age 63	diagnosed in 1976 at age 40	
Maggie Borg	(1952–2004)	Maltese activist and environmentalist; died at age 52		
Dame Joyanne Bracewell	(1934–2007)	Judge of the Family Division of the High Court of Justice (UK); died at age 72		
Rhona Brankin	(1950–present)	Scottish politician and Member of the Scottish Parliament	diagnosed in 2000s	
Edward Brooke	(1919–2015)	male African-American former U.S. Senator of Massachusetts; died at age 95 of natural causes	diagnosed in 2002 at age 83	
Robin Carnahan	(1961–present)	American politician, Missouri Secretary of State	diagnosed in 2006	
Stella Chen	(1950–2025)	Taiwanese politician; died aged 75		
Mary Jo Codey	(1955–present)	born Mary Jo Rolli, former First Lady of New Jersey, school teacher and wife of former Governor of New Jersey Richard Codey; Mary Jo's mother died due to breast cancer	diagnosed in 2002 at age 47	
Nellie Connally	(1919–2006)	born Idanell Brill, American wife of former Texas Governor John Connally; survived breast cancer and died of natural causes at age 87; established the Nellie B. Connally Breast Cancer Fund in 1989	diagnosed in 1988 at age 69	
Carol Connor	(1950–2004)	American judge; died at age 54		
Margaret "Maggie" Daley	(1943–2011)	born Margaret Ann Corbett, wife of American politician Richard M. Daley; First Lady of Chicago; died at age 68	diagnosed with metastatic breast cancer in 2002	
Virgilia D'Andrea	(1888–1933)	Italian political activist and poet; died at age 45		
Pat Danner	(1934–present)	American politician		
Jo Ann Davis	(1950–2007)	born Jo Ann Sides, American politician; died at age 57	diagnosed in September 2005 at age 55	
Sandra Deal	(1942–2022)	born Emilie Sandra Dunagan, American education advocate; first lady of Georgia (2011–2019); died at age 80	diagnosed in January 2018°	
Mary Beth Dolin	(1936–1985)	born Mary Elisabeth Brugger, American-Canadian politician and activist; died at age 49		
Peggy Duff	(1910–1981)	born Margaret Doreen Eames, British political activist and organiser of the Campaign for Nuclear Disarmament; died at age 71		
Eileen Dugan	(1945–1996)	American politician; Brooklyn, New York State Assemblywoman; died at age 51	diagnosed in 1992 at age 37	
Elizabeth Edwards	(1949–2010)	born Mary Elizabeth Anania, American lawyer and wife of John Edwards; died at age 61	diagnosed in 2004 at age 55	
Lorraine Elliott	(1943–2014)	Australian politician; died at age 70		
Margaret Ewing	(1945–2006)	born Margaret Anne McAdam, Scottish National Party politician and Member of the Scottish Parliament and wife of fellow MSP Fergus Ewing; died at age 60	diagnosed in 2002 at age 57	
Rita Fan	(1945–present)	Hong Kong politician		
Kaci Kullmann Five	(1951–2017)	Norwegian politician; died at age 65		
Betty Ford	(1918–2011)	born Elizabeth Anne Bloomer, First Lady of the United States (1974-1977) and founder of the Betty Ford Center; died at age 93	diagnosed in 1974 at age 56	
Jennie Formby	(1960–present)	British trade unionist and politician		
Bea Gaddy	(1933–2001)	born Beatrice Frankie Fowler, African-American Baltimore City Council member and advocate for the poor; recurrence in 2001; died at age 68	diagnosed in 1998 at age 65	
Luisa Gándara	(1954–2023)	Puerto Rican politician, first lady (2005–2009) and member of the House of Representatives (2013–2017); died at age 69 in 2023	diagnosed in 2011	
Jane Garrett	(1973–2022)	Australian politician; died at age 49		
Megan Lloyd George	(1902–1966)	born Megan Arvon George, Welsh politician and the first female Member of Parliament (MP) for a Welsh constituency; died at age 64 in 1966		
Anne Grommerch	(1970–2016)	French politician, member of the National Assembly of France		
Pia Hallström	(1961–2016)	Swedish politician, MP for Värmland (2010–2016); died 55		
Patricia Roberts Harris	(1924–1985)	Served as Secretary of Housing and Urban Development and Secretary of Health and Human Services during the Carter administration; died at age 60	diagnosed in 1983 at age 59	
Cathy Harvin	(1953–2010)	American politician		
Heidi Heitkamp	(1955–present)	North Dakota politician and lawyer; United States Senator of North Dakota from 2013 to 2019	diagnosed in 2000 at age 45	
Ángela Hernández	(1990–2022)	Colombian lawyer, journalist, and politician; died at age 31	diagnosed in 2020 at age 29	
Janette Howard	(1944–present)	born Janette Parker, wife of Australian Prime Minister John Howard	diagnosed in 1996 at age 52	
Melanie Johnson	(1955–present)	British Labour politician, former Member of Parliament		
Susan Kadis	(1953–present)	Canadian Member of Parliament	diagnosed in 1995 at age 42	
Vera Katz	(1933–2017)	American politician, first female Speaker of the Oregon House of Representatives, and 45th Mayor of Portland, Oregon; was later diagnosed with adenosarcoma, and died from leukemia.		
Joan Bennett Kennedy	(1936–2025)	born Virginia Joan Bennett, former wife of late Senator Edward M. Kennedy (Massachusetts); died at age 89 of dementia	diagnosed in 2005 at age 68	
Angela King	(1938–2007)	Jamaican diplomat; died at aged 68		
Lynne Kosky	(1958–2014)	Australian politician; died aged 56		
Jewel Lafontant	(1922–1997)	American politician and activist; died at age 75		
Joy Langan	(1943–2009)	Canadian politician and writer; died at age 66		
Peg Lautenschlager	(1955–2018)	American attorney, politician and activist; died at age 62		
Laura Liu	(1966–2016)	American judge; died at age 49		
Marilyn Lloyd	(1929–2018)	American politician and businesswoman; died at age 89		
The Baroness Maddock	(1945-2020)	British politician and life peer; died at age 75		
Datin Seri Endon Mahmood	(1940–2005)	wife of the Prime Minister of Malaysia Abdullah Ahmad Badawi; her twin sister, Noraini, died due to breast cancer in 2003; died at age 64	diagnosed in 2002 at age 61	
Carol Los Mansmann	(1942–2002)	born Carol Los, American lawyer, prosecutor, and judge; died at age 59	diagnosed in 1989	
Judy Eason McIntyre	(1945–present)	African-American politician, Oklahoma State Senator	diagnosed in August 2006	
Tucker L. Melancon	(1947–present)	male United States District Judge, Western District of Louisiana, 5th Circuit since 1994	diagnosed in 2002 at age 56	
Olga A. Méndez	(1925–2009)	American politician; died at age 82		
Dame Helen Metcalf	(1946–2003)	born Helen Pitt, British educator and politician; died at age 57	diagnosed in 1991	
Corinna Miazga	(1983–2023)	German politician; died at age 39		
Kathryn Morrison	(1942–2013)	American politician; died at age 71		
Joan Patricia Murphy	(1936/1937–2016)	American politician; died at age 79		
Sue Myrick	(1941–present)	American politician		
Sue Napier	(1948–2010)	Australian politician and first female Leader of the Tasmanian Opposition Party; died at age 62		
Janet Napolitano	(1957–present)	American politician, former Governor of Arizona, Secretary of Homeland Security	diagnosed in 2000 at age 43	
Jocelyn Newman	(1937–2018)	born Jocelyn Margaret Mullett, former barrister, solicitor, Senator from the Australian Parliament for Tasmania; treated successfully and died of Alzheimer's disease in 2018 at age 80	diagnosed in 1993 at age 56	
Meyera Oberndorf	(1941–2015)	American politician and 23rd Mayor of Virginia Beach, Virginia (1988–2008); died at age 74		
Anna Belle Clement O'Brien	(1923–2009)	Tennessee politician who worked for legislation to benefit breast cancer patients following her own diagnosis in the 1980s; died from a fall		
Eileen O'Connell	(1947–2000)	Member of the Legislative Assembly of Nova Scotia, Canada, for Halifax-Fairview; died on September 27, 2000, at age 53	diagnosed in 1998 at age 51	
Sandra Day O'Connor	(1930–2023)	American retired attorney and first female Associate Justice of the Supreme Court of the United States; died from complications related to advanced dementia and respiratory illness	diagnosed in 1988 at age 58	
Siobhán O'Hanlon	(1963–2006)	Northern Irish Sinn Féin official and former Provisional Irish Republican Army member; died at age 43 on 11 April 2006	diagnosed in October 2002 at age 39	
Susan Ople	(1962–2023)	Filipina politician and Overseas Filipino Workers' (OFW) rights advocate; died at age of 61		
Katherine O'Regan	(1946-2018)	born Katherine Victoria Newton, New Zealand county councillor, MP, and Associate Minister of Health (National Party)	diagnosed in 2008; died at age 71	
Irma Rangel	(1932–2003)	American politician, Texas State Representative; died of inflammatory breast cancer (also suffered from ovarian and brain cancers); died at age 71		
Nancy Reagan	(1921–2016)	born Anne Frances Robbins, former First Lady of the United States and wife of former President Ronald Reagan; died of natural causes at age 94	diagnosed in 1987 at age 66	
M. Jodi Rell	(1946–2024)	born Mary Carolyn Reavis, American politician, Governor of Connecticut; died at age 78	diagnosed in 2004 at age 58	
Fiona Richardson	(1966–2017)	Australian politician and officeholder; went into remission and returned to Parliament; in 2017, she announced she had several tumours - it was unclear if the breast cancer recurred or if it was a different cancer	diagnosed in 2013	
Happy Rockefeller	(1926–2015)	born Margaretta Large Fitler, American socialite and wife of the late former N.Y. Governor and U.S. Vice President Nelson Rockefeller; died following a short illness	diagnosed in 1974 at age 48; died at age 88	
Debbie Wasserman Schultz	(1966–present)	American politician		
Debra Shipley	(1957–present)	British politician, Labour Party Member of Parliament	diagnosed in 2005 at age 47	
Rochelle Lee Shoretz	(1972–2015)	American civil servant and founder of Sharsheret; died age 42		
Claire Shulman	(1926–2020)	born Claire Kantoff, American politician (1st female Borough President of Queens, New York City) and registered nurse; died at age 94 in 2020		
Ricky Silberman	(1937–2007)	born Rosalie Gaull, American conservative activist who co-founded the Independent Women's Forum; died at age 69		
Soong Mei-ling	(1898–2003)	Chinese political figure, painter and First Lady of the Republic of China as the wife of Generalissimo and President Chiang Kai-shek; died from natural causes at age 105		
Gloria Steinem	(1934–2026)	American founder of Ms. magazine, journalist, feminist and activist	diagnosed in 1986 at age 52	
Lynne Stewart	(1939–2017)	American lawyer and activist; died at age 77 from complications from breast cancer and a series of strokes		
Heather Stilwell	(1944–2010)	Canadian politician who strongly opposed homosexuality, abortion and sex education; died at age 66		
Anne Swarbrick	(c. 1952–present)	Canadian politician and activist		
Jan Tinetti	(1968–present)	New Zealand politician, Member of parliament (Labour Party)	diagnosed in 2019	
Linda Tripp	(1949–2020)	born Linda Rose Carotenuto, American federal government employee and Monica Lewinsky's former confidant; died from pancreatic cancer at age 70	diagnosed in 2001 at age 51	
Margaret Tor-Thompson	(1962–2007)	Liberian politician and member of Freedom Alliance Party of Liberia; biblical scholar; died at age 44		
Ann Veneman	(1949–present)	former head of the U.S. Dept. of Agriculture	diagnosed in 2002 at age 52	
Barbara Vucanovich	(1921–2013)	born Barbara Farrell; American politician (R-NV), the first woman to represent Nevada in the United States House of Representatives (1983–1997); died from natural causes at age 91	diagnosed in 1983	
Pat Ward	(1957–2012)	American politician and Iowa State Senator (2004–2012); died at age 55		
Jenna Welch	(1919–2019)	born Jenna Louise Hawkins, mother of American First Lady Laura Bush	diagnosed in 1997 at age 78	
Andrea West	(1952–2010)	Australian teacher and politician; died at age 57		
Anne Wexler	(1930–2009)	American lobbyist and political advisor; died at age 79		
Jodi White	(1946–2024)	Canadian political operative (1993 chief of staff to the prime minister); died at age 77		
Susie Wiles	(1957–present)	American political consultant serving as the 32nd White House Chief of Staff under 45th and 47th President Donald Trump	diagnosed in March 2026	

== Royalty ==
Name	Life	Comments	Diagnosis	Reference
Anne of Austria	(1601–1666)	mother of King Louis XIV of France and Philippe I, Duke of Orléans, wife of King Louis XIII, daughter of Habsburg parents, King Philip III of Spain and Margarita of Austria, sister of King Philip IV of Spain, aunt and mother-in-law of Spanish Habsburg princess Maria Theresa of Spain; died at age 64		
Louise Marie Adélaïde de Bourbon, Duchess of Orléans	(1753–1821)	French noblewoman		
Abigail Kuaihelani Campbell	(1858–1908)	born Abigail Kuaihelani Maipinepine Bright, member of the nobility of the Kingdom of Hawaii; died at age 50		
Lady Anne Hyde	(1637–1671)	Duchess of York, first wife of James, Duke of York (the future King James VII and II), mother of Queen Mary II and Anne, Queen of Great Britain, and daughter of Edward Hyde, 1st Earl of Clarendon; died at age 34		
Atossa, Queen of Persia	(550 BC–475 BC)	daughter of Persian King Cyrus the Great, half-sister and wife of Persian and Egyptian King Cambyses II, later wife of Cambyses II's brother, Persian and Egyptian King Smerdis, later wife of Persian and Egyptian King Darius I, and mother of Persian and Egyptian King Xerxes I; died at about age 75, circa 475 BC		
Queen Elizabeth the Queen Mother	(1900–2002)	born Elizabeth Angela Marguerite Bowes-Lyon, mother of Queen Elizabeth II and Princess Margaret, Countess of Snowdon; died at age 101 (breast and colon cancer survivor, only revealed posthumously)		
Princess of Ukok	(c. 500 BC)	"Siberian Ice Maiden", a Scytho-Siberian woman whose remains were found in Republic of Altai, Russia		
Elizabeth Seymour, Duchess of Somerset	(1667–1722)	Mistress of the Robes to Anne, Queen of Great Britain; died at age 55		
Empress Theodora	(c. 500–548)	empress of the Byzantine Empire and wife of Emperor Justinian I; both are commemorated on November 14 as saints in the Eastern Orthodox Church; died before the age of 50		
Victoria, Princess Royal	(1840–1901)	German Empress and Queen of Prussia by her marriage to Frederick III; eldest daughter of Queen Victoria and mother of Kaiser Wilhelm; died at age 60		
Amalie von Wallmoden, Countess of Yarmouth	(1704–1765)	Principal Mistress of King George II of Great Britain; died at age 61		
Sonja, Countess Bernadotte af Wisborg	(1944–2008)	Second wife of Count Lennart Bernadotte; died at age 64		

== Science ==
Name	Life	Comments	Diagnosis	Reference
Nalie Agustin	(1988–2022)	Canadian health and wellness advocate, public speaker, and author; died at age 33		
Claudia Alexander	(1959–2015)	Canadian-born American geophysicist and planetary scientist; died at age 56		
Elda Emma Anderson	(1899–1961)	American physicist and health researcher; died from breast cancer and leukemia at age 61		
Mary Anning	(1799–1847)	English fossil collector and paleontologist from Lyme Regis, Dorset, England; subject of the book Mary Anning of Lyme Regis by Crispin Tickell; died at age 48	diagnosed in 1845 at age 46	
Mary Astell	(1666–1731)	English philosopher and feminist writer; died at age 65	diagnosed in 1731 at age 65	
Dame Patricia Bergquist	(1933–2009)	born Patricia Rose Smyth, New Zealand zoologist and professor; died at age 76		
Yvonne Brill	(1924–2013)	born Yvonne Madelaine Claeys, Canadian-American rocket and jet propulsion engineer; died at age 88		
Constance Brinckerhoff	(1942–present)	American microbiologist and academic	diagnosed in 1996	
Rachel Carson	(1907–1964)	American environmentalist and author (Silent Spring); died at age 56	diagnosed in 1960 at age 53	
Dorothy Leavitt Cheney	(1950–2018)	American primatologist and scholar; died at age 68		
Willey Glover Denis	(1879–1929)	American biochemist and physiologist; died at age 49		
Anna Donald	(1966–2009)	born Anastasia Katherine Courtice, Australian epidemiologist and company director; died at age 42		
Ruth Marguerite Easterling	(1898–1943)	African-American physician and pathologist; worked with William Augustus Hinton to help develop the Hinton test for syphilis; died at age 45		
Sophie Germain	(1776–1831)	French mathematician; died at age 55		
Regine Hildebrandt	(1941–2001)	German biologist and politician; died at age 60		
Carolyn Kaelin	(1961-2015)	American physician, surgean and breast cancer researcher; survived breast cancer, died at age 54 from a glioblastoma multiforme brain tumor	diagnosed in 2003	
Lisa Lodwick	(1988–2022)	British archaeologist; died at age 34		
Glenda MacQueen	(1965–2020)	Canadian medical researcher and medical college professor at the University of Calgary; died at age 55		
Agnes Mary Mansour	(1931–2004)	American biochemist and former Catholic nun; died at age 73		
Maryam Mirzakhani	(1977–2017)	Iranian mathematician and academic; died at age 40		
Susan Niebur	(1972/1973–2012)	American planetary scientist; died at age 39	diagnosed in 2007	
Jerri Nielsen	(1952–2009)	born Jerri Lin Cahill, American physician who famously treated herself for breast cancer while stuck in the South Pole after discovering a lump on her breast, as depicted in the movie Ice Bound; died at age 57	diagnosed in 1999 at age 47	
Edith Pechey	(1845–1908)	aka Mary Edith Pechey-Phipson, British female physician and women's rights activist; died at age 63	diagnosed in 1907 at age 62	
Marjorie Shostak	(1945–1996)	American anthropologist; died at age 51	diagnosed in 1989 at age 44	
Nettie Stevens	(1861–1912)	American geneticist who discovered sex chromosomes; died aged 50		
Reina Torres de Araúz	(1932–1982)	Panamanian anthropologist, ethnographer and professor; aged 49		
Janice E. Voss	(1956–2012)	American engineer and NASA astronaut; died aged 55		
Judith D. Zuk	(1951–2007)	American conservationist, horticulturist and environmentalist; died at age 55		

== Sports ==
Name	Life	Comments	Diagnosis	Reference
Kathy Ahern	(1949–1996)	American professional golfer; died aged 47	diagnosed c. 1991	
Aïda Ba	(1983–2022)	French rugby union player; died at age 39		
Jen Beattie	(1991-present	Scottish professional footballer (Arsenal)	diagnosed in October 2020	
Raelene Boyle	(1951–present)	Australian Olympic champion athlete; in 2000; also surviving ovarian cancer	diagnosed in 1996 at age 45	
Kirsten Venetta Brown	(1963–2006)	African-American slalom canoeist; died at age 43		
Helen Callaghan	(1923–1992)	Canadian-born American baseball player; died at age 69		
Edna Campbell	(1968–present)	African-American professional basketball star	diagnosed in 2002 at age 34	
Candy Csencsits	(1955–1989)	American athlete and bodybuilder; died at age 33		
Marina Dalglish	(1951–present)	Founder of the Marina Dalglish Appeal; wife of Scottish former international football player Kenny Dalglish	diagnosed in 2003 at age 49	
Faye Dancer	(1925–2002)	Former star of the All-American Girls Professional Baseball League and the inspiration for Madonna's character in the film A League of Their Own; died at age 77	diagnosed in 2000 at age 75	
Eleanor Dapkus	(1923–2011)	American baseball player; died at age 87		
Cecilia De La Hoya	(1951–1990)	born Cecilia Gonzalez, mother of boxing champion Oscar De La Hoya who founded the Cecilia Gonzalez De La Hoya Cancer Center in her memory; died at age 39	diagnosed in 1988 at age 37	
Lydia de Vega	(1964–2022)	Filipino Olympic athlete; died at age 57		
Ebony Dickinson	(1977–2009)	American professional basketball player; died at age 32		
Kelly Jo Dowd	(1965–2007)	born Kelly Jo Dennis, American mother of golfer Dakoda Dowd	diagnosed in 2002 at age 37	
Ludmila Engquist	(1964–present)	Russian-Swedish hurdler	diagnosed in 1999 at age 34	
Heather Farr	(1965–1993)	American LPGA Tour golfer; died at age 28	diagnosed in 1989 at age 24	
Deanna Favre	(1968–present)	American author and founder of The Deanna Favre Hope Foundation; wife of American football quarterback Brett Favre	diagnosed in 2004 at age 35	,
Peggy Fleming	(1948–present)	American Olympic champion figure skater	diagnosed in 1998 at age 50	
Irina Gabashvili	(1960–2009)	Georgian-born Soviet gymnast		
Ernie Green	(1938–present)	African-American former professional Cleveland Browns football player; his two sisters were also diagnosed with breast cancer, one of whom died due to the disease	diagnosed in 2005 at age 67	
Sunny Hale	(1968–2017)	American polo player; died at age 48		
Dorothy Hamill	(1956–present)	American Olympic champion figure skater		
Shelley Hamlin	(1949–2018)	American professional golfer	diagnosed in 1991 at age 42; died at age 69	
Nina Hoekman	(1964–2014)	Ukrainian-born Dutch draughts player and coach; died at age 49		
Akira Hokuto	(1967–present)	born Hisako Uno, Japanese professional wrestler	diagnosed in 2015 at age 48	
Tiffany Jackson	(1985–2022)	American basketball player	died in 2022 at age 37	
Vivien Jones	(1951–2010)	British award-winning professional lacrosse player and physical education teacher; died at age 59		
Helene Mayer	(1910–1953)	German world champion Olympic fencer; died at age 42		
Nancy McDaniel	(1966–2024)	American golf coach and Golf Coaches Association Hall of Fame inductee; died at age 57		
Jane McGrath	(1966–2008)	born Jane Louise Steele, cancer support campaigner and wife of Australian cricket champion Glenn McGrath; died at age 42 from complications during brain tumor surgery	diagnosed in 1997 at age 31	
Ellen Meliesie	(1963–2026)	Dutch rower (women's lightweight double sculls event at the 1996 Summer Olympics); died at age 63		
Karen Muir	(1952–2013)	South African competitive swimmer; died at age 60		
Martina Navratilova	(1956–present)	Czech-American former professional tennis player		
Gayle Olinekova	(1953–2003)	Canadian marathon runner and bodybuilder; died at age 50		
Jenny Olsson	(1979–2012)	Swedish cross-country skier; died at age 32		
Lily Parr	(1905–1978)	English professional women's football player; died at age 73		
Mona-Lisa Pursiainen	(1951–2000)	Finnish female athlete and sprinter; died at age 49		
Judy Rankin	(1945–present)	born Judy Torluemke, American Hall of Fame professional golfer	diagnosed in 2006 at age 61	
Betsy Rawls	(1928–2023)	American Hall of Fame professional golfer	diagnosed in 1999 at age 71	
Keani Reiner	(1952–1994)	American surfer and sailor; died at age 42		
Dorothy Shula	(1933–1991)	born Dorothy Alice Bartish, American wife of Miami Dolphins football coach Don Shula who founded the Don Shula Foundation for breast cancer research; died at age 57 from breast and lung cancer	diagnosed in 1985 at age 51	
Annarita Sidoti	(1969–2015)	Italian race walker; died at age 45		
Rell Sunn	(1950–1998)	American world surfing champion; died at age 47	diagnosed in 1983 at age 32	
Mickey Wright	(1935–2020)	American Hall of Fame professional golfer; died from a heart attack at age 85. At the time, she had been hospitalized following a fall a few weeks prior.	diagnosed in 2006	
Kay Yow	(1942–2009)	American head coach of the women's basketball team at North Carolina State University; died at age 66	diagnosed in 1987 at age 45; recurrence in 2004 at age 62	

== Television and radio ==
Name	Life	Comments	Diagnosis	Reference
Cecilia Alvear	(1939–2017)	Ecuadorian-born American journalist		
Sarah Beeny	(1972–present)	English broadcaster and entrepreneur	diagnosed in 2022 at age 50	
Rachael Bland	(1978–2018)	English journalist and podcast presenter; member of You, Me and the Big C	diagnosed in 2016 at age 38; died in 2018 at age 40	
Alison Booker	(1963–2010)	English radio broadcaster; died at age 47		
Julia Bradbury	(1970–present)	Irish-born English television presenter and journalist	diagnosed in 2021 at age 51	
Pattie Daly Caruso	(1944–2017)	mother of American television personality Carson Daly; died of a heart attack at age 73	diagnosed in 2008 at age 64	,,
Sarah Cawood	(1972–present)	English broadcaster and presenter	diagnosed in 2021 at age 49	
Julia Child	(1912–2004)	born Julia Carolyn McWilliams; American television chef, known as "The French Chef"; survived breast cancer and died of natural causes at age 91	diagnosed in 1967 at age 55	
Pattie Coldwell	(1952–2002)	English television presenter and journalist. sSurvived breast cancer twice, first being diagnosed in 1997 and then again in 1998; eventually died from a brain tumour at age 50	diagnosed in 1997; recurred in 1998	
Joan Riddell Cook	(1922–1995)	American journalist and labor activist and founder of J.A.W.S. (Journalism and Women Symposium); died at age 73		
Victoria Derbyshire	(1968–present)	British journalist, newsreader and broadcaster		
Helen Dewar	(1936–2006)	American journalist and news reporter; died at age 70		
Anne Diamond	(1954–present)	English journalist, broadcaster and television presenter		
Janice Dickinson	(1955–present)	American television personality, model, businesswoman and writer		
Brenda Edwards	(1969–present)	English singer, actress and television presenter	diagnosed in 2019 at age 50	
Eva Ekvall	(1983–2011)	Venezuelan television newsreader, author and former Miss Venezuela; died aged 28		
Linda Ellerbee	(1944–present)	born Linda Jane Smith; American television journalist, newsreader and author	diagnosed in 1991 at age 47	
Sarah Ferguson	(1959–present)	English author, television personality, and former member of the British royal family as the former wife of Andrew Mountbatten-Windsor		
Pegeen Fitzgerald	(1904–1989)	American radio personality; died at age 84		
Mary Lou Forbes	(1926–2009)	American journalist and commentator; died age 83		
Lacey Fosburgh	(1942–1993)	American journalist and author		
Trisha Goddard	(1957–present)	British television presenter		
Jennifer Griffin	(1969–present)	American journalist		
Samantha Harris	(1973–present)	American television personality, presenter and model		
Laura Ingraham	(1963–present)	American radio host/pundit	diagnosed in 2005 at age 41	
Rita Henley Jensen	(1947–2017)	American journalist and founder of Women's eNews		
Christine Kay	(1964–2019)	American journalist and editor; died at age 54		
Caron Keating	(1962–2004)	Northern Irish television celebrity; the Caron Keating Foundation was founded in her honor; died at age 41	diagnosed in 1997 at age 34	
Judy Lee Klemesrud	(1939–1985)	American journalist (The New York Times); died at age 46		
Hoda Kotb	(1964–present)	American television newsreader, journalist and correspondent		
Rose Kushner	(1929–1990)	American journalist and advocate for breast cancer patients		
Jane Larkworthy	(1962–2025)	American journalist and editor; died at age 62		
Geralyn Lucas	(1967–present)	American journalist, television producer and writer		
Joan Lunden	(1950–present)	American television journalist and newsreader		
Jennifer Lyon	(1972–2010)	American contestant on the CBS reality television series Survivor: Palau; died at age 37	diagnosed in 2005 at age 33	
Lauren Mahon	(1985–present)	British cancer activist and podcast presenter		
Michele Marsh	(1954–2017)	American television journalist and news anchor; died at age 63		
Davina McCall	(1967–present)	English television presenter		
Debbie McGee	(1958–present)	English television, radio and stage performer	diagnosed in 2018 at age 59	
Carol McGiffin	(1960–present)	English radio and television broadcaster	diagnosed in 2014 at age 54	
Wendy Mesley	(1957–present)	Canadian television presenter and reporter for CBC Television	diagnosed in January, 2005 at age 48	
Andrea Mitchell	(1946–present)	American television journalist, anchor, reporter, and commentator		
Diana Moran	(1939–present)	born Diana Ruth Dicker, British model, fitness expert and journalist; known as "The Green Goddess" on BBC1's Breakfast Time television programme in the 1980s	diagnosed in 1988 at age 47	
Dame Jenni Murray	(1950–2026)	born Jennifer Susan Bailey, British BBC presenter	diagnosed in 2006 at age 56	
Deborah Orr	(1962–2019)	Scottish journalist and author (The Guardian, The Independent); died at age 57		
Vikki Orvice	(1962–2019)	British sports journalist; died at age 56		
Ruth Picardie	(1964–1997)	English journalist and editor; died at age 33		
Heather Pick	(1970–2008)	American television news reporter and activist for breast cancer and type 1 diabetes awareness		
Amy Robach	(1973–present)	American television news correspondent		
Dede Robertson	(1927–2022)	born Adelia Elmer, American nurse, author, television personality, and activist; wife of American Christian televangelist Pat Robertson; died at age 94	diagnosed in 1986 at age 59	
Cokie Roberts	(1943–2019)	American journalist, author and television personality; died at age 75		
Robin Roberts	(1960–present)	American television broadcaster, basketball player and LGBT rights activist.		
Rod Roddy	(1937–2003)	American radio and television announcer; died at age 66 and also suffered from colon cancer throughout his life		
Sara Sidner	(1972–present)	American newsreader and journalist		
Susan Stamberg	(1938–present)	born Susan Levitt, American radio journalist for National Public Radio	Diagnosed in 1986 at age 48	
Caroline St John-Brooks	(1947–2003)	Anglo-Irish journalist and academic; died aged 56		
Betty Thompson	(1934–1994)	Canadian television host of a children's programme produced at CKCO's studios; founded the annual Betty Thompson Golf Classic for breast cancer fundraising; died at age 60	diagnosed in 1990 at age 56	
Beverly Thomson	(1964–2025)	Canadian television journalist and correspondent (CTV News Channel); died aged 61		
Marietta Peabody Tree	(1917–1991)	American socialite and political reporter; died aged 74		
Laura Valenzuela	(1931–2023)	Spanish television presenter, actress and model; after successfully being treated for breast cancer, later died from Alzheimer's disease at age 92		
Harriet Van Horne	(1920–1998)	American newspaper columnist and television critic; died at age 77		
Amelyn Veloso	(1974–2017)	Filipino journalist and broadcaster; died at age 43		
Geraldine Warrick-Crisman	(1930–2007)	American television executive and former assistant New Jersey state treasurer; died at age 76		Notice of death of Geraldine Warrick-Crisman; accessed November 1, 2015.
Sian Williams	(1964–present)	Welsh journalist and current affairs presenter		
Rebecca Wilson	(1961–2016)	Australian sports journalist; died at age 54		

== Visual arts ==
Name	Life	Comments	Diagnosis	Reference
Harriet Barber	(1968–2014)	English figurative painter; died at age 46		
Coosje van Bruggen	(1942–2009)	Dutch-American sculptor, art historian and critic; died at age 66		
Lucy, Lady Duff-Gordon	(1863–1935)	born Lucy Christiana Sutherland, London-born Canadian early 20th century fashion designer known as "Lucile"; sister to screenwriter Elinor Glyn; survivor of the sinking of The Titanic; died at age 71		
Joan Eardley	(1921–1963)	Scottish artist; died aged 42		
Miriam Engelberg	(1958–2006)	American graphic artist/writer/blogger; died on October 18, 2006, at age 48	diagnosed in 2001 at age 43	
Char Fontane	(1952–2007)	American actress and singer; died at age 55		
Lona Foote	(1950/1951–1993)	American photographer; died on April 15, 1993, at age 42		
Marti Friedlander	(1928–2016)	British-New Zealand photographer; died at age 88		
Margaret Furse	(1911–1974)	British costumer; died at age 63		
Marie-Suzanne Giroust	(1734–1772)	French painter; died aged 38		
Arlene Gottfried	(1950–2017)	American photographer; died at age 66		
Kate Greenaway	(1846–1901)	British illustrator; died at age 55		
Kelly Hoppen	(1959–present)	South African-born British interior designer and author		
Trina Schart Hyman	(1939–2004)	American children's book illustrator; died at age 65		
Betsey Johnson	(1942–present)	American fashion designer	diagnosed in 1999 at age 47	
Margaret Kilgallen	(1967–2001)	American artist; died at age 33		
Tina Knowles	(1954–present)	born Celeste Ann Beyoncé, American fashion designer and author, mother of singers Beyoncé and Solange Knowles	diagnosed in 2024 at age 70	
Shirley Ardell Mason	(1923–1998)	American artist, inspiration for the book and film Sybil; died at age 75		
Matuschka	(1954–present)	born Joanne Motichka, American fine art photographer and breast cancer activist	diagnosed in 1991	
Jean Muir	(1928–1995)	English fashion designer; died at age 66		
Polixeni Papapetrou	(1960–2018)	Australian photographer; died at age 57		
Sandra Sakata	(1940–1997)	American fashion designer and retailer; died at age 57		
Hollis Sigler	(1948–2001)	American painter; died at age 53	diagnosed in 1985, the cancer returned in 1991; by 1993, it had spread to her bones, pelvis and spine; Sigler's mother and a great-grandmother had also succumbed to the disease	
Olabisi Obafunke "Bisi" Silva	(1962–2019)	Nigerian contemporary art curator		
Jo Spence	(1934–1992)	British photographer; died at age 58	diagnosed in 1982 at age 48	
Hendrickje Stoffels	(1626–1663)	Artist model and mistress of the Dutch painter Rembrandt		
Deborah Sussman	(1931–2014)	American graphic designer and artist; died at age 83		
Barbra Walz	(1950/1951–1990)	American fashion photographer; died at age 39		
Thelma Wood	(1901–1970)	American sculptor; died at age 69		

== Writing ==
Name	Life	Comments	Diagnosis	Reference
Kathy Acker	(1947–1997)	born Karen Lehman, American author, playwright, and essayist; died at age 50	diagnosed in 1996, aged 49	
Valentine Ackland	(1906–1969)	born Mary Kathleen Macrory Ackland, British poet; died at age 63		
Lisa Bonchek Adams	(1969–2015)	born Lisa Deborah Bonchek, American writer known as @AdamsLisa; died at age 45	diagnosed in 2012	
Ingela Agardh	(1948–2008)	Swedish journalist and television personality; died at age 59		
Margery Allingham	(1904–1966)	British mystery writer; died at age 62		
V. C. Andrews	(1923–1986)	born Cleo Virginia Andrews, American author; died at age 62		
Lisa A. Barnett	(1958–2006)	American science fiction writer and editor; also suffered from a brain tumor		
Sally Belfrage	(1936–1994)	British author and journalist; died at age 57		
Caroline Benn	(1926–2000)	American-born British educationalist and writer; died at age 74		
Clara Berenbau	(1980–2013)	Uruguayan writer, journalist, presenter, and announcer; died aged 32		
Jami Bernard	(1956–present)	American author and film critic for the New York Daily News	diagnosed in 1996 at age 40	
Judy Blume	(1938–present)	American writer diagnosed with invasive ductal carcinoma in August 2012; long-term cervical cancer survivor		
Erma Bombeck	(1927–1996)	born Erma Louise Fiste, American columnist and author; survived breast cancer but died during a kidney transplant at age 69	diagnosed in 1992 at age 55	
Sherwood Bonner	(1849–1883)	born Katherine Sherwood Bonner, American author and feminist (died at age 34)	diagnosed in 1881	
Anna Bunina	(1774–1829)	Russian poet and writer; died at age 55		
Frances Burney	(1752–1840)	English novelist, diarist and playwright; survived breast cancer; died at age 88		
Anna Petrovna Bunina	(1774–1829)	Russian poet and writer; died at age 55		
A. V. Christie	(1963–2016)	American poet; died aged 53		
Jackie Collins	(1937–2015)	British-American romance novelist and actress; died at age 77		
Joan Riddell Cook	(1922–1995)	American journalist and labor activist; founded JAWS (Journalism and Women Symposium); died at age 73		
Cheryl Crane	(1956–present)	American writer, real estate broker and model		
Julia Darling	(1956–2005)	Award-winning British writer; died at age 48		
Antoinette-Thérèse Des Houlières	(1659–1718)	French poet; died at age 59		,
Antoinette du Ligier de la Garde Deshoulières	(1638–1694)	French poet; died at age 56		
Helen Dewar	(1936–2006)	American political reporter for The Washington Post newspaper; died at age 70		
Sarah Dorsey	(1829–1879)	American novelist and historian; died aged 50		
Siobhan Dowd	(1960–2007)	British children's writer and activist; died aged 47		
Shirley Graham Du Bois	(1896–1977)	born Lola Shirley Graham Jr., African-American author, playwright, composer and activist; married to W.E.B. DuBois; died at age 80		
Susan Duncan	(1951–2024)	Australian author and magazine editor		
Barbara Ehrenreich	(1941–2022)	born Barbara Alexander, American author, political activist and ethicist		
Miriam Engelberg	(1958–2006)	American graphic novelist and blogger; died at age 48		
Judith Exner	(1934–1999)	American author; died at age 65		
Annalee Fadiman	(1917–2002)	born Annalee Whitmore, World War II foreign correspondent for Life and Time magazines and author. Committed suicide at age 85 after suffering from breast cancer and Parkinson's disease		
Oriana Fallaci	(1929–2006)	Italian writer and journalist; died at age 77		
Harriet Fier	(1950–2018)	American magazine editor; died at age 67		
Caitlin Flanagan	(1961–present)	American magazine writer, editor and book author	diagnosed in 2003 with stage 3 breast cancer, which later metastasized to other parts of her body	
Mary Lou Forbes	(1926–2009)	born Mary Lou Werner, aka Ludie Forbes, American journalist and commentator	diagnosed in 2009, several weeks before her death at age 83	
Lacey Fosburgh	(1942–1993)	American author; died at age 50		
Lynn Franklin	(1946–2021)	American author; died at age 74		
Margaret Frazer	(1946–2013)	American historical novelist; died at age 66		
Alta Gerrey	(1942–2024)	American prose writer, poet, and publisher; died at age 81		
Margaret Gibson	(1948–2006)	Canadian novelist and short story writer; died at age 57		
Kathi Kamen Goldmark	(1948–2012)	American author, columnist, publishing consultant and music producer; died at age 63		
Emily Gosse	(1806-1857)	English poet, author, religious tract writer; died at age 50		
Rose Gray	(1939–2010)	English chef and cookery writer; died at age 71		
Lady Augusta Gregory	(1852–1932)	Irish nationalist writer and landowner; died at age 80		
Jane Hamsher	(1959–present)	born Jane Murphy, American film producer, author and liberal blogger	diagnosed 3rd time in December 2006 at age 47	
Emma Hannigan	(1972–2018)	Irish author and blogger known for blogging about her cancer experience	diagnosed in 2007; died at the age of 45	
Virginia Hamilton	(1936–2018)	American novelist and children's book author; died at age 67		
Teva Harrison	(1976–2019)	Canadian-American writer, poet, memoirist, and graphic artist; died at age 42	diagnosed roughly six years before her death	
Sara Henderson	(1936–2005)	Australian author and pastoralist; died at age 68		
Dorothy Hewett	(1923–2002)	Australian writer, poet and playwright; died at age 79		
Molly Ivins	(1944–2007)	American journalist and author diagnosed with inflammatory breast cancer; died at age 62	diagnosed in 1999 at age 55	
Alice James	(1848–1892)	American diarist, sister of American psychologist William James and American author Henry James and daughter of American theologian Henry James Sr.; died at age 43		
Mandy Jenkins	(1980–2023)	American journalist and editor; died at age 42	diagnosed four years before her death	
E. Pauline Johnson	(1861–1913)	Canadian poet and orator; died at age 51		
June Jordan	(1936–2002)	African-American professor of African-American studies, poet and author of 28 books; died at age 62	diagnosed in 1992 at age 56	
Nikhat Kazmi	(1958/1959–2012)	Indian writer and film critic; died at age 53		
Kris Kovick	(1951–2001)	American writer, cartoonist and LGBT rights activist; died at age 50		
Jennifer Lash	(1938–1993)	aka Jini Fiennes; British writer/artist (mother of Ralph, Joseph, Martha, Magnus, Sophie and Jacob Fiennes); died at age 55	diagnosed in the 1980s	
Frances Lear	(1923–1996)	Lear magazine publisher; died at age 73		
Violette Leduc	(1907–1972)	French novelist and memoirist; died at age 65		
Betsy Lehman	(1955–1994)	Boston Globe newspaper columnist; she and Maureen Bateman, a teacher, both of whom had advanced breast cancer, died of medication overdoses at Boston's Dana Farber Institute; the Betsy Lehman Center for Patient Safety and Medical Error Reduction was created in the aftermath of the scandal (Lehman died at age 39 and Bateman died at age 55)		
Anna Maria Lenngren	(1754–1817)	Swedish feminist writer and poet; died at age 62		
Élisabeth Leseur	(1866–1914)	born Pauline Élisabeth Arrighi, French mystic and diarist; died at age 47		
Nikolai Leskov	(1831–1895)	male Russian writer; died at age 64		
Andrea Levy	(1956–2019)	English novelist; died at age 62		
Audre Lorde	(1934–1992)	born Audrey Geraldine Lorde, African-American author; died at age 58	diagnosed at 44 in 1978	
Geralyn Lucas	(1968–present)	American journalist, television producer, and writer	diagnosed in 1995 at age 27	
Lisa Lynch	(1979–2013)	English journalist, known for writing about her experiences of having cancer in The C-Word; died at age 33		
Sarah Maguire	(1957–2017)	English poet, broadcaster and translator; died aged 60		
Zoleka Mandela	(1980–2023)	South African writer; she was treated for breast cancer in 2011, which returned in 2016; died at age 43		
Marisa Acocella Marchetto	(1962–present)	American writer, cartoonist and memoirist		
Melissa Nathan	(1968–2006)	British novelist; died at age 37	diagnosed in 2001 at age 32; breast cancer recurred in 2003	
Ai Ogawa	(1947–2010)	National Book Award-winning American poet, writer and educator; died at age 62		
Grace Paley	(1922–2007)	American poet, writer and political activist; died at age 84		
Ruth Picardie	(1964–1997)	British writer and columnist for The Observer; died at age 33	diagnosed in October 1996 at age 32	
Barbara Pym	(1913–1980)	British author/writer; died at age 66		
Dina Rabinovitch	(1963–2007)	British journalist for The Guardian and book author; died at age 45	diagnosed in June 2004	
Elayne Rapping	(1938–2016)	American author, critic/analyst of popular culture; died at age 77		
Claire Rayner	(1931–2010)	born Claire Berenice Berkovitch (later Chetwynd), British journalist, broadcaster, novelist and nurse; died at age 79	diagnosed in 2002	
Cokie Roberts	(1943–2019)	American author, journalist, and television news anchor; died at age 75	diagnosed in 2002 at age 58	
Betty Rollin	(1936–2023)	American author, retired TV correspondent; died by assisted suicide following health decline at the Pegasos Swiss Association in Basel, aged 87	first diagnosed in 1975 at age 39; second diagnosis in 1984 at age 48	
Kate Ross	(1956–1998)	American mystery writer and lawyer; died at age 41		
Deidre Sanders	(1945–present)	born June Deidre Sanders, English columnist and agony aunt	diagnosed in 2022 at age 77	
May Sarton	(1912–1995)	Belgium-born American poet, novelist, and memoirist; died at age 83		
Dame Daphne Sheldrick	(1934–2018)	Kenyan-British author, conservationist and expert in animal husbandry; died at age 83		
Carol Shields	(1935–2003)	Canada-based U.S. author; died at age 68		
Anya Krugovoy Silver	(1968–2018)	American poet; died at age 49		
Ingrid Sischy	(1952–2015)	South African-born American magazine editor and critic; died at age 63		
Susan Sontag	(1933–2004)	born Susan Rosenblatt, American author, diagnosed with metastatic breast cancer, but died due to leukemia traceable to the massive doses of radiotherapy and chemotherapy received decades earlier for her breast cancer; also diagnosed with a rare form of uterine cancer; died at age 71	diagnosed at 42 in 1975	
Karin Stanford	(1961–present)	African-American writer and professor		
Barbara Strauch	(1951–2015)	American author, reporter and newspaper editor; died at age 63		
Rose Pastor Stokes	(1879–1933)	American writer, feminist and socialist; died at age 53		
Marie Stopes	(1880–1958)	Scottish author, palaeobotanist, and birth control advocate; died at age 78		
Jacqueline Susann	(1918–1974)	born Jacqueline Susan, American writer; died at age 56	diagnosed in 1962 at age 44; recurred in January 1973 at age 55	
Joni Eareckson Tada	(1961–present)	American evangelical Christian author, radio host, and disability advocate		
Melanie Tem	(1949–2015)	American horror and dark fantasy author; died at age 65		
Amy Uyematsu	(1947-2023)	American poet, activist, educator	diagnosed in 2021	
Joyce Wadler	(1948–present)	American journalist and memoirist (also surviving ovarian cancer)		
Margaret Walker	(1915–1998)	American poet, writer and academic; died at age 83		
Tricia Walker	(1964–2018)	British author; died at age 53		
Angela Webber	(1955–2007)	Australian writer and comedian; died at age 52		
Dolly Wilde	(1895–1941)	English socialite, niece of Irish writer Oscar Wilde and friend of American writer Natalie Clifford Barney; died at age 45 of undisclosed causes	diagnosed in 1939	
Kim Yale	(1953–1997)	American writer and editor for multiple comic book companies (including Marvel, DC, First and Warp Graphics); died at age 43		
