= Ángela Hernández =

Ángela Hernández may refer to:

- Ángela Hernández Álvarez (1990–2022), Colombian lawyer, journalist, and politician
- Ángela Hernández Cajo (born 1961), Peruvian lawyer and politician
- Ángela Hernández Núñez (born 1954), Dominican Republic writer, educator and feminist
