= Fusion Magazine =

Fusion Magazine may refer to:

- Fusion, a music magazine published in Boston, Massachusetts, from 1967 to 1974
- Fusion Magazine (Kent State University)
- Fusion Magazine (political magazine), founded and edited by Glenn Beck and published in the United States
- Fusion Magazine, a scientific magazine published by the LaRouche movement, shut down by the U.S. government in 1987 and later succeeded by 21st Century Science and Technology
- Fusion, an online arts magazine published by Berklee College of Music
- Fusion, the quarterly staff magazine of Associated-Rediffusion and later Rediffusion, London from 1958 until 1967
- Fusion, a video game magazine that succeeded Electronic Games and ran from 1995 to 1996
