= Chiswick School =

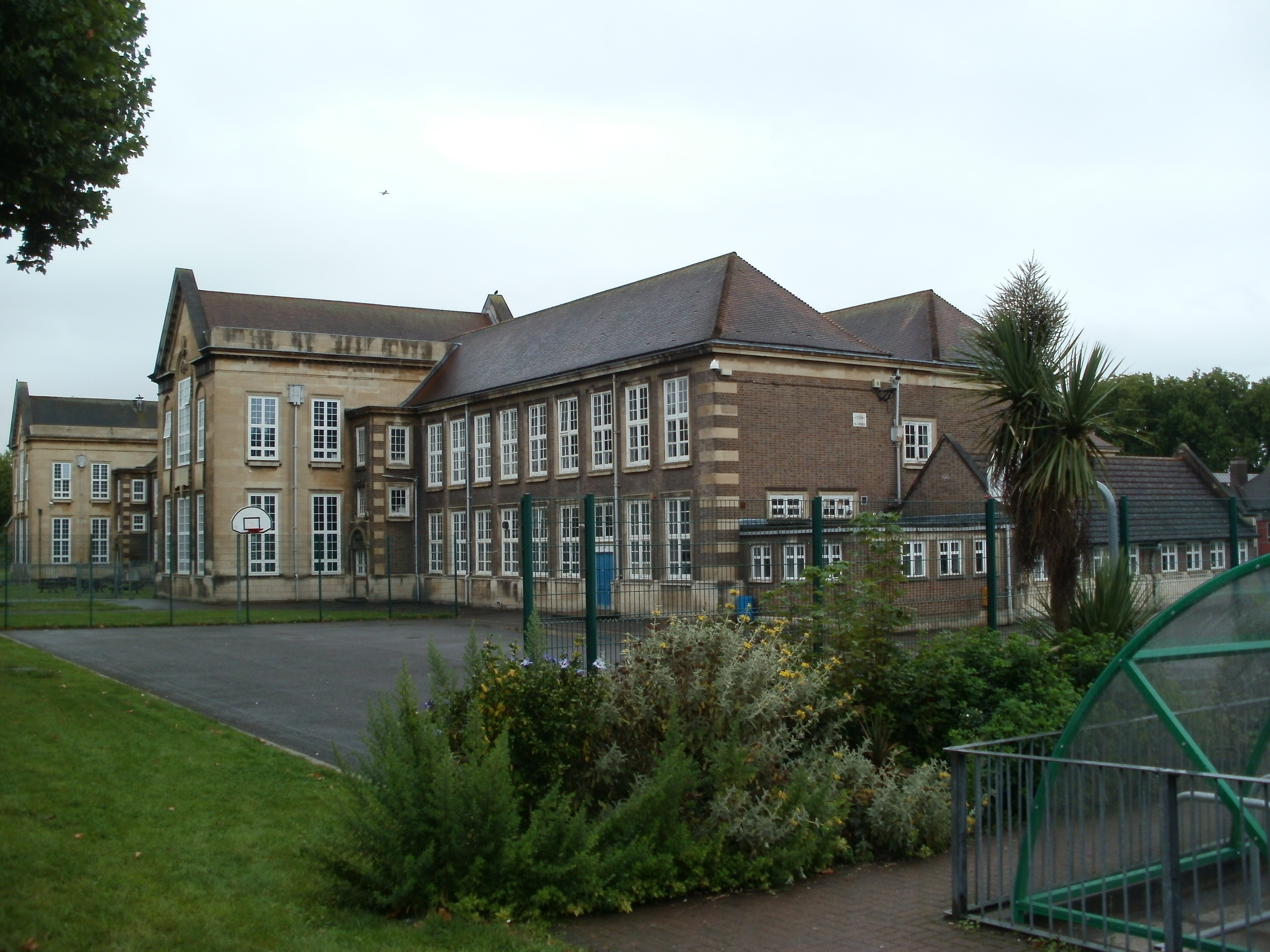

Location
- Burlington Lane – Staveley Road; Chiswick, London, W4 3UN; England; 51.48192°N 0.25981°W

Information
- Type: Academy
- Established: 1968; precursors from 1916
- Founder: R.K Hands
- Department for Education URN: 137907 Tables
- Ofsted: Reports
- Headteacher: Laura Ellener
- Gender: Mixed
- Age: 11 to 18
- Enrolment: 1590
- Colour: Royal Blue Navy White
- Publication: Chiswick School News
- Website: http://www.chiswickschool.org

Chiswick School /ˈtʃɪzɪk/ is an English secondary school with academy status in Chiswick, West London. It educates more than 1,500 pupils, aged 11 to 18 years.

This number includes 400 pupils studying at the upper school sixth form within the school grounds. The current headteacher is Laura Ellener. The school operates a very wide curriculum, mainly focusing on Science and the Arts, and has many co-curricular activities.

== Admissions ==
The school has a wide catchment, encompassing its native borough of Hounslow, but also areas including Kensington and Chelsea, Richmond, and Hammersmith and Fulham. Half of the school's students are of minority ethnic backgrounds, and 44% are from ‘disadvantaged’ backgrounds. 50% have English as their second language. The percentage of disadvantaged students receiving help from the pupil premium is also above average.

In 2023, the School changed its Year 7 admissions policy to admit 'up to 10 pupils who show musical aptitude and qualify for pupil premium funding', making it the only school in the UK with such an arrangement.

== History ==
Chiswick County School for Girls opened in 1916 in Burlington Lane, and Chiswick County School for Boys opened in 1926 beside the girls' school. Rory K. Hands was appointed head of the boys school in 1963, and in 1966, he oversaw a merger of the two institutions, to form the co-educational Chiswick County Grammar School. Shortly thereafter, the Borough proposed that Hands' grammar school should be merged with two nearby secondary modern schools to form a comprehensive school, following Circular 10/65. This amalgamation created Chiswick Comprehensive School, which opened in 1968. The new school operated across two sites, with the lower school (for ages 11 to 14) occupying what had been the secondary modern school's buildings at Staveley Road, and the upper school operating on the old grammar school site at Burlington Lane.

In 1973, some of the buildings at Staveley Road had to be closed as they were made of brittle high alumina cement. The school was forced to operate with a "village of huts"; Hands maintained school morale with a production of The Gondoliers by Gilbert and Sullivan. He retired the headship in 1975 after suffering a series of heart attacks. Dame Helen Metcalf was the school's headteacher from 1988 to 2001, providing strong and emotionally intelligent leadership. Sometime after 1978 the school was renamed Chiswick Community School; the name reverted to Chiswick School when it became an academy on 1 March 2012.

== Awards ==
- Chiswick Calendar Community Participation Award, Winner 2023 & 2024
- Secondary School of the Year, Pearson Teaching Awards, Bronze Winner 2025
- National Schools Theatre Award-Best Play 2024 ( Animal Farm)
- TES Excellence in Creative Arts 2023
- Great Big Dance off Regional winners (SW and London) 2025

== Notable pupils ==
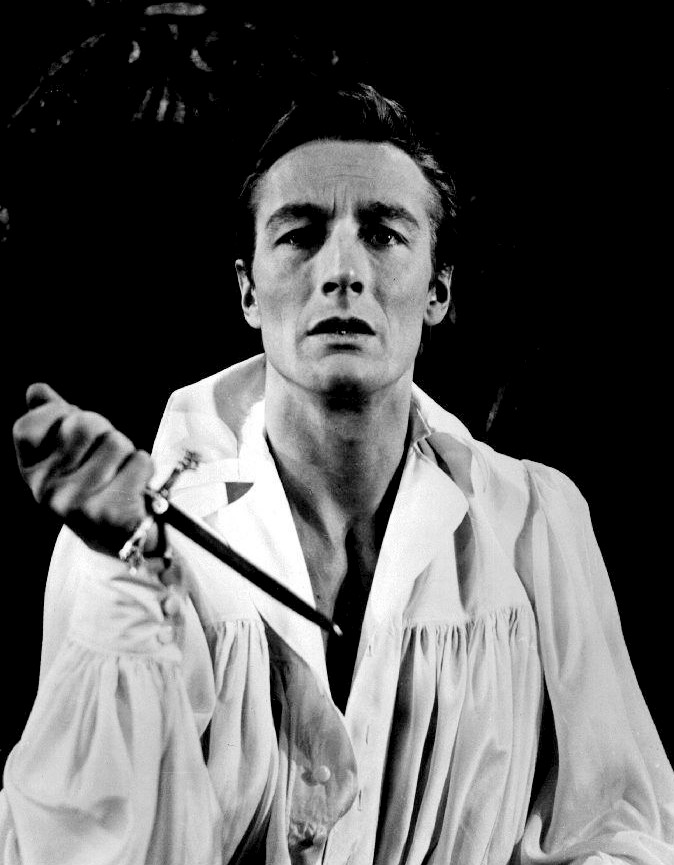
John Neville as Hamlet (1959)

- John Stuart Archer (1943–2007) – petroleum engineer, president of the Institution of Chemical Engineers
- Henry Badowski - musician
- Carlton Cole – footballer
- Phil Collins – lead singer of Genesis and solo artist
- Phoebe Fox – actor
- Kenneth Holmes (1934–2021) - molecular biologist
- John Neville (1925–2011) – actor
- Nana Ofori-Twumasi – footballer
- Natalie Sawyer – TV presenter
- Kyle Simmons – keyboard player for Bastille
- James Stevenson, guitarist
- Allegra Stratton – journalist, political aide
- Don Taylor (1936–2003) – director and playwright
- Brian Tesler (1929–2024) – chairman of London Weekend Television
