= Mandy Jenkins =

American journalist (1980–2023)

Mandy Marie Jenkins
- Born: August 16, 1980; Aurora, Colorado, U.S.
- Died: February 26, 2023 (aged 42); Zanesville, Ohio, U.S.
- Education: Kent State University
- Website: zombiejournalism.com

Mandy Marie Jenkins (August 16, 1980 – February 26, 2023) was an American journalist and editor, known for creating several online local news outlets and her work in the development of digital journalism.

== Early life ==
Jenkins was born in Aurora, Colorado to Roddy Jenkins and Anita Clark in 1980, and was later raised in Zanesville, Ohio. She graduated from West Muskingum High School in 1998 and attended Kent State University from 1998 until 2004, receiving both a bachelor's and master's degree in journalism.

== Career ==
While a student at Kent State University, Jenkins was heavily involved with student media, writing for and managing the Daily Kent Stater and leading The Burr Magazine as editor-in-chief. Jenkins also co-founded Fusion Magazine, an LGBTQ+ publication for students, in 2002; she served as editor-in-chief from 2003 until 2004.

Fusion is still the only student magazine focused on LGBTQ+ issues in Northeast Ohio. "It was pretty groundbreaking at the time to have an LGBTQ-facing news product magazine, and I think it's been an incredibly valuable asset for our students to have those voices be out and represented,” Sue Zake, a former professor of Jenkins', said.

Professionally, Jenkins started her career as a fellow at WKSU in 2002, before moving to work for the Milwaukee Journal Sentinel as a digital producer in 2004 and The Cincinnati Enquirer in 2007. While at these organizations (and others, including the Huffington Post and Digital First Media), Jenkins developed and honed the newsrooms' transitions to digital formats from print media, spearheading web layouts and online news strategy.

Jenkins began working with digital media outlet Storyful in 2014, later serving as its editor-in-chief in 2017. She was a Knight Journalism Fellow at Stanford in 2018 and 2019, and researched the disconnect between news organizations and news consumers.

In 2021, Jenkins became the head of product at Factal, an organization focused on risk assessment and responses, especially for disaster response, for businesses and newsrooms created by the Breaking News Network.

=== Local newsroom start-ups ===
In 2010, Jenkins had a critical role in launching TBD.com with WJLA-TV, which combined the work of the station's broadcast staff with community engagement-driven journalism and blogs.

Following her Knight fellowship, Jenkins managed The Compass Experiment, a partnership between news publisher McClatchy and the Google News Initiative. The partnership's goal was to create several online newspapers in communities without consistent or any news coverage, and initially targeted Youngstown, Ohio, which had recently dealt with the planned closing of its print daily paper, The Vindicator. From the partnership, Jenkins launched Mahoning Matters, a hyperlocal news site for the Mahoning Valley, in just 40 days in fall 2019.

After the success of Mahoning Matters, Jenkins launched the Longmont Leader, a publication in Longmont, Colorado meant to fill the void by the Longmont Times-Call and the closure of the Longmont Observer.

In 2021, The Compass Experiment partnership dissolved, and the ownership of the two newsrooms transitioned to different organizations; Mahoning Matters was transferred to McClatchy, while the Longmont Leader was bought by Canadian publisher Village Media. As of August 2023, both newsrooms are still running, and serve as news sources for their respective communities.

“Local news is where I started my career and I feel it is began of our industry’s connection with the audience,” Mahoning Matters quotes Jenkins as having written prior to its founding. “Local news tells their stories, lives in their communities, and earns their trust through the kind of accountability that comes when you might run into your area reporter at the grocery store.”

=== Online News Association ===
Jenkins was active in the Online News Association, and acted in several roles on its board for eight years; she served as president of the organization in 2018 and 2019. She helped to develop the organization's Women's Leadership Accelerator program in 2015, which is focused on the training and coaching of female journalists in digital media.

== Personal life ==
Jenkins died of breast cancer in Zanesville in 2023, aged 42, after four years of treatments. She lived in New York City with her husband, Ben Fischer, a reporter for the Sports Business Journal. They met while studying at Kent State University and working for the student newspaper.

== Awards ==
- 2019 John S. Knight Journalism Fellow
- 2023 Rich Jaroslovsky Founder Award, Online News Association (posthumous)

== See also ==
- Fusion (Kent State University)
- Online News Association
