= Ángela Hernández Núñez =

Dominican writer, educator and feminist

Angela Hernández Núñez
- Born: May 6, 1954 (age 72); Jarabacoa, Dominican Republic
- Citizenship: Dominican Republic
- Education: Universidad Autónoma de Santo Domingo
- Writing career
- Notable awards: Dominican National Literary Award: Short Story (1998)

Ángela Hernández Núñez (born May 6, 1954) is a writer, educator and feminist in the Dominican Republic.

== Life ==
Núñez was born in Jarabacoa and studied chemical engineering at the Universidad Autónoma de Santo Domingo. She was the director of the Centro Nacional de Ayuda y Estudio de la Mujer and a member of the Dominican Chapter of Criticism for Latin America. She was an active member of the Circulo de Mujeres Poetas (Circle of Women poets) and a founding member of the Grupo de Mujeres Creadoras (Group of Creative Women).

In 1998 she was awarded the Dominican National Literary Award for her short story, Piedra de Sacrificio.

== Selected works ==
- Emergencia del silencio (Emerging from silence), essays (1985)
- Tizne y cristal (Dust and crystal), poems (1985)
- Edades del asombro (Ages of amazement), poems (1985)
- De críticos y creadores (Critics and creators), essays (1988)
- Alótropos (Allotropes), stories (1989)
- Masticar una rosa (To chew a rose), stories (1993)
- Arca espejada (Mirrored ark) (1994)
- Telar de rebeldía (Loom of defiance), poems (1998)
- Piedra de sacrificio (Sacrificial stone), stories 1999), won the Premio Nacional de Cuentos

== Awards ==
- 1998 Dominican National Literary Award: Short Story for Piedra de Sacrifico
