= The Quin-Tones =

- Origin: York, Pennsylvania, United States
- Genres: Doo-wop
- Years active: 1957–1960, 1986–1990s
- Labels: Chess, Red Top Records, Hunt Records
- Past members: Roberta Haymon; Carolyn Holmes; Jeannie Crist; Phyliss Carr; Ronnie Scott; Kenny Sexton; Vince Carr; Ceaser Westbrook; Buck Generetta

The Quin-Tones were an American doo wop group from York, Pennsylvania, United States. They had one hit record, "Down the Aisle of Love" in 1958.

== History ==
The group's members all attended William Penn High School (York, Pennsylvania), and originally formed in 1957 under the name The Quinteros to sing at local functions. Paul Landersman, a disc jockey at WHGB in Harrisburg, Pennsylvania became their manager and had them record four songs. The first to be released was "Ding Dong", issued on Chess Records in 1958; the song did not chart but the group received some notice for the tune.

"Down the Aisle of Love" was the next single, a marriage song which opened with the melody of "Here Comes the Bride". It was initially released on Red Top Records but, once it started to sell, was redistributed by Hunt Records. The song became a nationwide hit, reaching No. 5 on the US Billboard R&B chart, and No. 20 on the Billboard Hot 100. Following this the group appeared on American Bandstand and toured the country, including an August 23, 1958, show at the Apollo Theater with The Coasters, The Olympics, The Spaniels, and The Chantels, at which they received a standing ovation.

"There Be No Sorrow" and "Heavenly Father," follow-up singles recorded under new management, failed to chart. The group never recorded after this, having only released five singles, and broke up in 1960 when lead vocalist Roberta Haymon married. The group reunited in 1986 and continued with an altered lineup into the 1990s; some of the original members died in this decade. Phyliss Carr managed the band in the 1980s and 1990s after retiring from performance. She died on April 20, 2006, from breast cancer, at the age of 66.

== Members ==
The Quin-Tones

- Roberta Haymon (d. 1996)
- Carolyn "Sissie" Holmes (d. 1995)
- Jeannie Crist (d. 2008)
- Phyliss Carr (d. 2006)
- Ronnie Scott(d.2019)
- Kenny Sexton(d.2017)

The New Quin-Tones

- Vince Carr(d.2016)
- Ceaser Westbrook
- Buck Generetta

== Bibliography ==
- Clemente, John ed. (2013). Girl Groups — Fabulous Females Who Rocked The World (Second ed.). Authorhouse Publishing. pp. 384–387. ISBN 978-1-4772-7633-4
