= Lona Foote =

American photographer

Lona Foote (July 19, 1950 – April 15, 1993) was an American photographer who specialised in photographing the avant-garde jazz, dance and art scenes of New York City in the 1980s and early 1990s. Her photographs appeared in The New York Times, Down Beat, Ear and The Village Voice.

Together with the photographer Bob Parent, who died in 1987, Foote is commemorated annually by the Lona Foote/Bob Parent Award for Career Excellence in Photography since 2001 at the Jazz Journalists Association Jazz Awards.

Foote died of breast cancer on April 15, 1993, aged 42, at Beth Israel Medical Center, Manhattan.

== Bibliography ==
- Foote, Lona (March 1988). "Meet the Composer: George Lewis". EAR: New Music News. 13 (2): 30–31.
- Foote, Lona (May 1988). "Meet the Composer: Jeanne Lee". EAR: New Music News. 13 (3): 28–29.
