= Miriam Engelberg =

American comics artist (1958–2006)

- Born: January 7, 1958; Philadelphia, Pennsylvania, U.S.
- Died: October 17, 2006 (aged 48); San Francisco, California, U.S.
- Known for: Cartoonist, illustrator, blogger
- Spouse: James Gormley
- Children: 1

Miriam Linda Engelberg (January 7, 1958 – October 17, 2006) was a graphic novelist and illustrator, whose battle with metastatic breast cancer was chronicled in her bestselling comic memoir, Cancer Made Me a Shallower Person.

Engelberg was born to a Jewish family in Philadelphia but raised in Lexington, Kentucky as a Quaker. She began practicing Judaism during college and later converted to Catholicism. She referred to herself as a "Catholic-Quaker-Jew". She worked as a teacher which provided fodder for her and a friend, Gayle Schmitt, to write and perform a black comedy, Spit Out Your Gun, It's School Policy. In 2001, at the age of 43, she was diagnosed with breast cancer. She observed the harrowing and difficult experience she had with cancer treatment. These observations, drawn in Engelberg's primitive style, would eventually be published as Cancer Made Me a Shallower Person. In August 2006, she revealed in her blog that her cancer had spread to her brain, and she was receiving palliative care through home hospice. As of October 2006, Engelberg was still continuing to publish comics through her website, although her once weekly comic updates were growing less frequent and consistent.

== Death and legacy ==
Miriam Engelberg died on October 17, 2006, aged 48. She was survived by her husband and son. As a staff member at CompassPoint Nonprofit Services, she served as both a technology trainer and resident cartoonist. Her cartoon Planet 501c3 was the first cartoon series depicting life in the nonprofit sector. She was credited with coining the term "accidental techie", describing many of her students who had a role as technology experts in small nonprofits despite having little or no formal training in technology. The term is widely used in the nonprofit sector and was inspiration for the book Accidental Techie: Supporting, Managing, and Maximizing Your Nonprofit's Technology.

== Works ==
- Cancer Made Me a Shallower Person, HarperCollins, New York City ISBN 0060789735
- Welcome to Planet501c3: Tales from The Nonprofit Galaxy, CompassPoint
- Accidental Techie: Supporting, Managing, and Maximizing Your Nonprofit's Technology, amazon.com

Her work was also published in the San Francisco Bay Guardian, Nonprofit Quarterly, and CASE's Currents Magazine.
