= Natalie Ng =

Hong Kong actress (1974–2026)

- 吳文忻
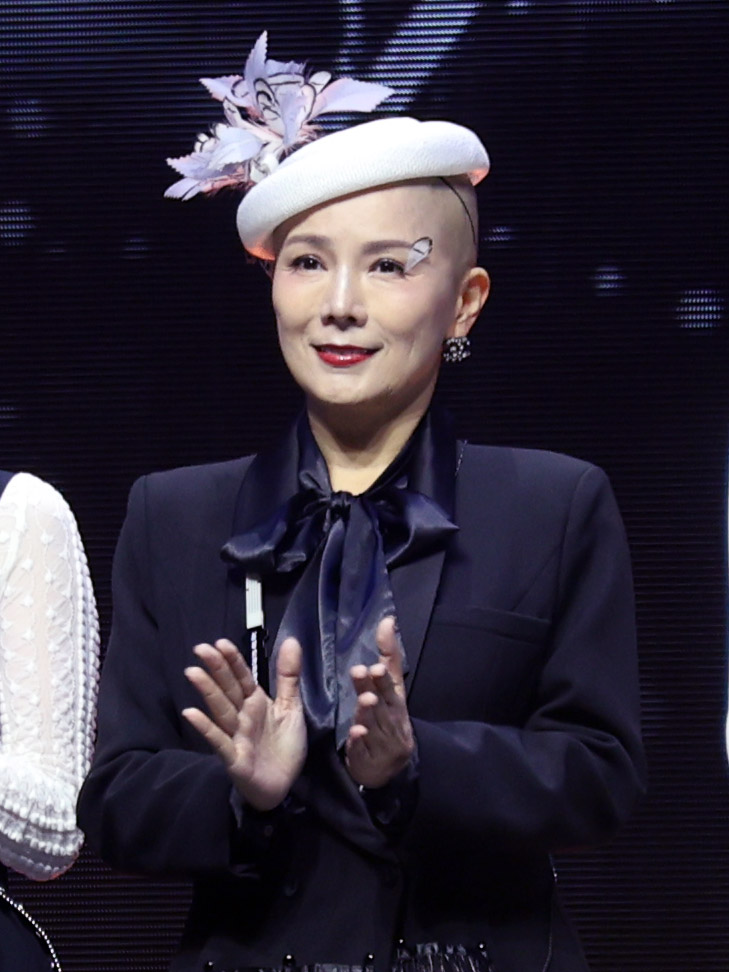
- Ng in December 2025
- Born: Ng Man-yan; 14 October 1974 (age 51); Hong Kong
- Died: 9 June 2026 (aged 51); Hong Kong
- Occupation: Actress

Natalie Ng Man-yan (Chinese: 吳文忻; 17 October 1974 – 9 June 2026) was a Hong Kong actress.

== Life and career ==
Ng was born on 17 October 1974 in Hong Kong. In 1998, Ng placed third in the Miss Hong Kong 1998 contest. Throughout her career, Ng appeared in a number of television series including The Kung Fu Master (2000), Fairy Tale of the Market (2004).

== Illness and death ==
In 2022, Ng was diagnosed with breast cancer and was in remission for a while, but the cancer recurred at stage III, and the cells spread to the lymph glands. In 2025, it worsened to the fourth stage. The cancer cells moved to the liver.

Ng died from the cancer on 9 June 2026, at the age of 51.
