= Joan Riddell Cook =

American journalist

- Born: January 5, 1922; Portland, Oregon, U.S.
- Died: February 5, 1995 (aged 73); New York City, U.S.
- Occupations: Journalist, editor, labor unionist
- Notable credit(s): The New York Times, The Detroit News, New York Herald-Tribune, Minneapolis Star Tribune

Joan Riddell Cook (January 5, 1922 – February 5, 1995) was an American journalist, editor and trade unionist who a founding director of the Journalism and Women Symposium (JAWS).

== Early life ==
Cook was born on January 5, 1922, in Portland, Oregon. She was a 1939 graduate of Marlborough School, a all-girls day and boarding school in Los Angeles.

== Career ==
Cook started her career at the Minneapolis Star Tribune. She later left and started working at the New York Herald Tribune. Cook later worked for two years as women's editor at The Detroit News.

Cook started working for The New York Times in 1959, where she worked until her retirement in 1991. She was one of seven named plaintiffs in a successful class action Title VII sex discrimination lawsuit against the Times that was filed in 1974. Cook served as head of the Times unit of the New York City Newspaper Guild labor union and was only the second woman ever elected to the post.

Cook also served as president of the Silurians, which is the oldest press club in New York.

Cook first joined JAWS (Journalism and Women Symposium) in 1989 and became a member of the first board of directors.

== Death ==
Cook died of breast cancer, on February 5, 1995, aged 73 in New York City.

== Legacy ==
Cook appears by name in The Girls in the Balcony: Women, Men, and the New York Times by author Nan C. Robertson and A Place in the News: From the Women's Pages to the Front Page by Kay Mills.

=== Joan Cook Scholarship Fund ===
After her death, JAWS created the Joan Cook Scholarship Fund in her honor. It provides yearly grants to young women through JAWS.
