= Helen Metcalf =

British academic, educator and politician

Helen Metcalf

Dame Helen Metcalf, DBE, FRSA (née Pitt; 7 October 1946 – 3 December 2003) was a British academic, educator, and politician.

== Biography ==
Born as Helen Pitt in Enfield, Middlesex, she attended Enfield Grammar School and Manchester University and earned a teaching diploma at Roehampton University. Later she earned her Master's in Economic History at the London School of Economics (LSE). In 1968 she married David Metcalf, a fellow student at Manchester University, and later a professor of economics at the LSE; they had one child, a son, Tom.

Among the schools at which she taught were Dame Alice Owens from 1972; Islington Green Comprehensive from 1974; and Acland Burghley Comprehensive from 1982. She took a hiatus from teaching after being elected as a Labour councillor in Islington in 1971. She resigned from local politics in 1978 and returned to teaching. She became headteacher at Chiswick Community School in 1988.

For most of her time as head of Chiswick Community School (1988–2001) she was ill, battling breast cancer which had been initially diagnosed in 1991. She died in 2003, aged 57, in London. In recognition of her achievements, Helen Metcalf was appointed a Dame Commander of the Order of the British Empire for her "services to education" in 1998.
