= Anne-Claire Goulon =

French businesswoman (1974–2026)

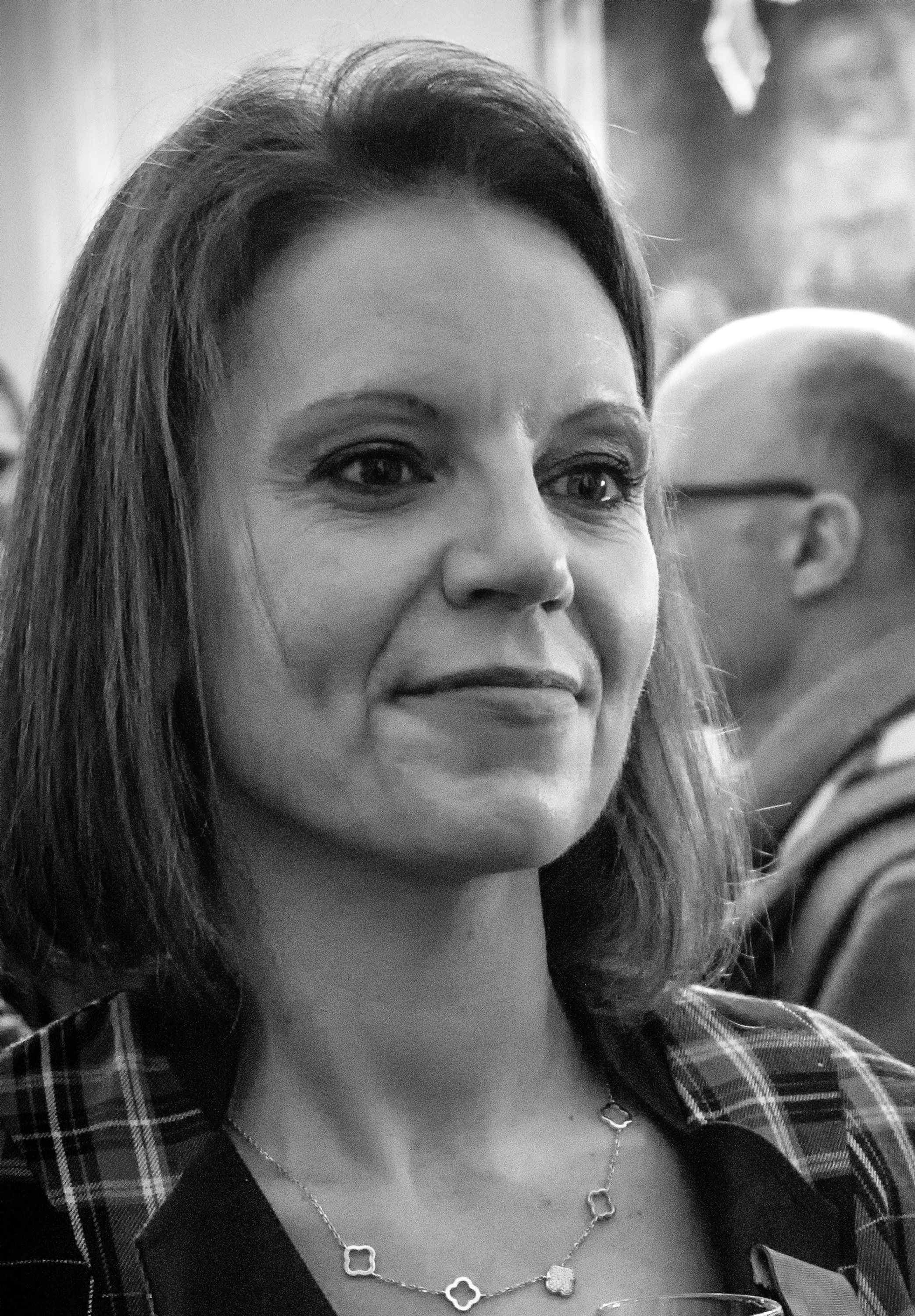
- Goulon in 2020
- Born: 1 April 1974; Pont-à-Mousson, France
- Died: 4 January 2026 (aged 51)
- Education: ESC Lille
- Occupation: Businesswoman

Anne-Claire Goulon (French: [an klɛʁ gulɔ̃]; 1 April 1974 – 4 January 2026) was a French businesswoman.

== Life and career ==
Born in Pont-à-Mousson on 1 April 1974, Goulon completed her primary and secondary studies in her hometown. After working on a farm throughout much of her childhood, she attended ESC Lille, graduating in 1996. That year, she began working for Johnson & Johnson before leaving in 2001 to work in transportation, eventually joining MGE in 2010. In 2016, she began working for Livio, a construction and civil engineering firm and worked alongside Frédéric Peduzzi, the founder's grandson. She oversaw the transition of the company's operational structure and launched a corporate social responsibility policy. She also worked on a merger between company departments.

In 2017, Goulon became president of the Fondation Agir Contre l'Exclusion (FACE) in Vosges, with the goal of building bridges between marginalized job seekers and businesses. She brought together more than 160 companies and institutions and developed numerous innovative initiatives. These included initiatives focused on professional integration, such as "matches for employment," which bring together employers, HR representatives, employees, and job seekers for a series of sporting events designed to break the ice and build relationships more quickly. From 2018 to 2019, she managed the recruitment of 100 people for a waste incineration plant project in Rambervillers. In 2019, she proposed to the government the implementation of an economic inclusion program through employment. She organized direct meetings between people who had left the job market and companies affiliated with FACE. In 2021, she stepped down and was succeeded by Sophie Tachon-Simonnet.

Goulon was also a member of the Réseau des ambassadeurs des Vosges and sought to promote the department's economic strengths. In 2018, she organized the 80th anniversary of the Livio Group in the presence of Olympians Matthieu Péché and Gauthier Klauss, the Vosges natives who became world champions in two-person canoe. That year, she was diagnosed with breast cancer, though she continued to work and gave her testimony to the way she benefited from the support of her superiors and colleagues, which further motivated her to fight, and eventually enter a long period of remission before a recurrence. Amidst the COVID-19 pandemic in France, she supported photographer Michel Laurent to create a series of portraits of masked people with the aim of highlighting the systemic damage of the pandemic. This exhibition, initially digital and then physical, served as an educational tool in schools. For International Women's Day in 2023, she joined a cohort of 12 women who sought to climb Mount Kilimanjaro.

Goulon died of complications from breast cancer on 4 January 2026, at the age of 51.

== Awards ==
- Trophées des Femmes de l’économie dans le Grand Est dans la catégorie Innovation Sociale (2017)
- Ambassadrice pour l'égalité hommes-femmes dans les Vosges (2020)
- Carrier of the Olympic flame for Lille (2 July 2024)

== Distinctions ==
- Knight of the Ordre national du Mérite (2019)
