= Aisha Abimbola =

Nigeria actress (1970–2018)

- Born: Aisha Abimbola; December 19, 1970; Lagos State, Nigeria
- Died: May 15, 2018 (aged 47); Canada
- Citizenship: Nigerian
- Education: Lagos State Polytechnic
- Occupation: Actress
- Known for: No Pain, No Gain, Awarijaye, So wrong So Right, Omoge Campus
- Awards: City People Entertainment award Yoruba Personality of the year

Aisha Abimbola (December 19, 1970 – May 15, 2018) was a Nigerian actress and a Yoruba movie star.

== Early life and education ==
Abimbola was born in Epe, Lagos State into a Muslim family and later converted to Christianity, the religion she practiced till the time of her death. In a New Telegraph interview, she said her desire to be an actress stopped her from becoming a pastor. She married Victor Ibrahim Musa, and they had two children. Aisha attended her secondary education at Ebute Elefun High School and was the Head Girl of the ‘1994 set’. She later attended Lagos State Polytechnic (LASPOTECH) where she graduated with HND in Catering and Hotel Management, and did her youth service in 2002.

== Career ==
Abimbola started her journey into the movie industry with Wale Adenuga Production. She walked up to director Antar Laniyan and asked him for a role. Fortunately for her, the director was waiting for one of the cast members and the role was given to her. This was like manna sent down from heaven. She did her best in that role which eventually landed her into more roles. However, a role in the movie Omoge Campus by Bola Igida turned everything around for her. This movie placed her on the stardom of talented actresses in 2001. She easily and talentedly interpreted her roles in indigenous and non-indigenous productions swaying her fans with her skills. At a point in her career, she ventured into movie production with her debut on a movie titled T’omi T’eje in 2016. This was presented in Atlanta and the music was performed by King Rokan.

== Selected filmography ==
- No Pain, No Gain
- Awerijaye
- So Wrong So Right
- Omoge Campus
- Kamsons and Neighbour

== Award ==
- City People Entertainment Award for Yoruba Movie Personality of the Year (2015).

== Death ==
Abimbola died from breast cancer in a hospital at Canada, aged 47. She is buried at Meadowvale Cemetery in Brampton.

She had two children whom her best friend, Lola Alao, won the custody of after taking Abimbola's husband to court and winning the case.
