= Mary Lou Forbes =

American journalist (1926–2009)

- Born: Mary Lou Werner; June 21, 1926; Alexandria, Virginia
- Died: June 27, 2009 (aged 83); Alexandria, Virginia, USA
- Occupation: Journalist
- Known for: Pulitzer Prize

Mary Lou "Ludie" Forbes (née Werner: June 21, 1926 – June 27, 2009) was an American journalist and commentator. She spent six decades at the Washington Evening Star and The Washington Times, serving as the Times commentary editor until weeks before her death. As Mary Lou Werner she won the annual Pulitzer Prize for Local Reporting (Edition Time) for her Evening Star coverage of the 1958 school integration crisis in Virginia in the aftermath of the 1954 Supreme Court of the United States decision in Brown v. Board of Education.

== Life ==
Mary Lou Werner was born in Alexandria, Virginia, and raised by her widowed mother. She graduated from George Washington High School (later one of the constituent schools of T. C. Williams High School). Briefly, she attended the University of Maryland, College Park, where she majored in math but was forced to drop out due to financial considerations. Werner had applied for a position at the Washington Evening Star because it was located in Washington, D.C., along a bus route that ran to her home in Alexandria. She had seen a newspaper ad for an accounting position, but accepted a position as a copy girl after finding out that the spot she had wanted was already filled. She mentored to reporters such as Carl Bernstein, whom she met when he began at the Star as a copyboy.

Werner covered the "massive resistance" program of opposition to school integration that had been undertaken by U.S. Senator Harry F. Byrd and followed by Governor of Virginia J. Lindsay Almond, who had proclaimed in his 1958 inaugural address that "integration anywhere means destruction everywhere". Under the constant pressure of meeting deadlines at an afternoon paper that published five editions daily, she reported on a rapidly progressing story over the course of a year, compiling information from late-breaking court actions and other events and synthesizing them into a coherent story. Werner observed that "Ninety percent of my stuff would be dictated, right off the top of my head."

She was named as the commentary page editor at the Times in 1984, two years after it was established, where she helped foster the career of conservative commentator and pundit Cal Thomas, whose columns first appeared in the paper in the mid-1980s.

== Death ==
Forbes died of breast cancer at Inova Alexandria Hospital in Alexandria, Virginia on June 27, 2009, six days after her 83rd birthday. She had been diagnosed only several weeks earlier.
