= Dakoda Dowd =

American golfer

Dakoda Flowie Dowd (born April 3, 1993), also known as "Koda", is an American amateur golfer. On April 27, 2006, 24 days after her 13th birthday, she became the youngest player to compete in an LPGA tournament. This record was broken a year later when 12-year-old Alexis Thompson qualified for and played in the 2007 U.S. Women's Open.

== Career ==
Dowd, who lives in Palm Harbor, Florida, has won more than 185 junior trophies. In 2006, she was ranked number one among United States sixth graders. As of June 2008, Golfweek ranked her 231st among all junior U.S. girls golfers.

In March 2006, Dowd received a sponsor's exemption to play in the inaugural LPGA Ginn Open after Bobby Ginn was made aware of a story in The Tampa Tribune about Kelly Jo Dowd, Dakoda's mother. Kelly Jo was fighting cancer and her dream was to see her daughter play in an LPGA event. Once the exemption was granted, Dakoda and Kelly Jo's story attracted considerable media attention and she was followed by a large gallery during the tournament. After a birdie at the first hole she went on to finish the first round with a 2-over par score of 74. She completed her first two rounds 12 strokes over par, missed the cut, and finished near the bottom, tied for 156th place out of 162 competitors.

In 2007, she attempted to qualify for the U.S. Women's Open but did not make it to the second round of qualifying.

== Family ==
Dowd's mother, Kelly Jo, was diagnosed with breast cancer in the fall of 2002. Kelly Jo underwent a double mastectomy and chemotherapy treatments. Doctors believed the cancer had gone into remission, but several years later, Kelly Jo was discovered to have metastatic cancer which had spread to her bones and liver. Dakoda scaled back her golf activities in order to spend more time with her mother, who doctors said could have only months to live. The Dowds were moved into a studio apartment due to medical costs and the loss of Kelly Jo's income, despite fundraising efforts by Kelly Jo's former employer, Hooters. Hooters also became active in the Susan G. Komen Foundation.

Kelly Jo died of cancer on May 24, 2007. She was named among the Top HOOTERS girls of all time in 2008 as part of the restaurant's chain 25th anniversary. Lorena Ochoa, the winner of the Ginn Open in 2008 was awarded the Kelly Jo Dowd trophy in her honor.
