= John W. Nick =

American activist

John W. Nick (April 17, 1933 – June 11, 1991) was a male breast cancer patient and activist in whose name the eponymous John W. Nick Foundation was founded in 1996 by his daughter, Nancy Nick, who is the Foundation's president. The Foundation, a 501(c)(3) non-profit organization, works to raise awareness of male breast cancer.

In part due to the Foundation's efforts the AMA issued a new policy statement to recognize breast cancer as a condition that affects men as well as women. In issuing this statement the AMA went on record to support the expansion of education and awareness efforts about the risks, signs and symptoms of male breast cancer.
