= Fusion (Kent State University) =

Student magazine at Kent State University

- Cover of the Fall 2012 issue
- Editor-in-Chief: Selected Each Semester
- Categories: Social Media
- Frequency: produced by students twice per academic year
- Circulation: 5,000
- Founded: 2002
- Company: Kent State University
- Country: United States
- Based in: Kent, Ohio
- Language: English
- Website: http://ohiofusion.com

Fusion Magazine is an LGBTQ focused student run magazine at Kent State University. It was started in the fall of 2002 by founding editors Mandy Jenkins, Marie Cornuelle, and advisor Kate Common, eventually becoming a permanent part of student media.

Since then, the magazine has won several awards and continues to expand its audience base. Published twice a year by KSU students, Fusion addresses sexuality issues using in-depth feature articles and photo essays. Past stories tackled political trends, religion and sexuality, domestic partner benefits, LGBT athletes in the NCAA, anti-discrimination policies, parents coming out to spouses and children, gay adoption, AIDS support groups, physical and mental health issues, social change and more.

Its national advertisers have included the popular lesbian magazine, Curve, as well as Pride & Equality Magazine. The magazine received recognition from the Society of Professional Journalists, including First Place for the Best Student Magazine published more than once a year in print and also First Place for Best All-Around Online Student Magazine.

The combined efforts of student media advisor Kate Common and award winning The Burr Magazine editor-in-chief Mandy Jenkins interviewing Kent State University President Carol Cartwright resulted in Fusion Magazine eventually gaining a permanent office in Kent State University's Student Media and Professional School of Journalism.

The magazine received a $2,000 grant from the Gay Community Endowment Fund of Akron Community Foundation in December 2006.

== Awards ==
=== 2003 ===
Society of Professional Journalists Mark of Excellence Awards:

- First Place: Photo Illustration, Scott Galvin, "Fighting homophobia on the field"
- Second Place: Best All-Around Online Student Magazine, Staff
- Third Place: Feature Photography, Pat Jarrett, "My (Gay) Fraternity Life"
- Honorable Mention: Best Student Magazine (published once a year), Staff

=== 2004 ===
Society of Professional Journalists Mark of Excellence Awards:

- First Place: Best Student Magazine (Published More Than Once a Year), Staff
- First Place: Best All-Around Online Student Magazine, Staff

=== 2006 ===
Society of Professional Journalists Mark of Excellence Awards:

- First Place: Best Student Magazine, Staff
- Third Place: Best Affiliated Web site, Staff

=== 2013 ===
Association for Education in Journalism and Mass Communication Magazine Division Awards:

- Third Place: Design, Staff

=== 2015 ===
Association for Education in Journalism and Mass Communication Magazine Division Awards:

- Honorable Mention: People, “All About Andrew", Dana Woods
- Third Place: Single Issue of an Ongoing Magazine, Brittany Rees, Editor

=== 2018 ===
Association for Education in Journalism and Mass Communication Magazine Division Awards:

- First Place: General Excellence, Staff

=== 2022 ===
Fusion's staff was recognized in 2022 by the Society of Professional Journalists Mark of Excellence (MOE) Awards Region 4 as "Best Student Magazine."
