= Ángela Hernández Álvarez =

Colombian lawyer, journalist, and politician (1990–2022)

Ángela Hernández
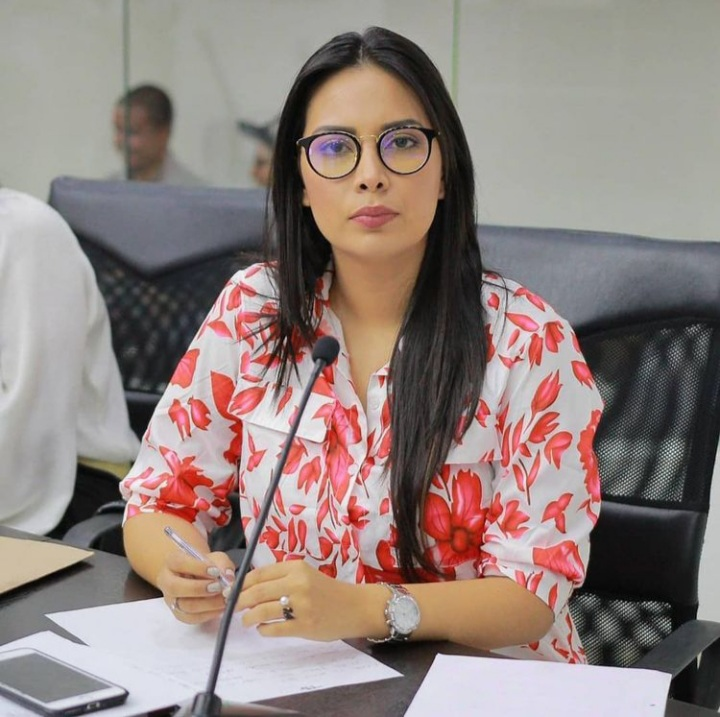

Member of the Municipal Council of Floridablanca
- In office 1 January 2013 – 31 December 2015

Personal details
- Born: Ángela Patricia Hernández Álvarez; 14 October 1990 Floridablanca, Colombia
- Died: 1 May 2022 (aged 31) Bucaramanga, Colombia
- Party: Union Party for the People
- Spouse: Jefferson Vega Buitrago
- Children: 1
- Education: Corporación Universitaria de Ciencia y Desarrollo
- Occupation: Lawyer; Journalist
- Known for: Family movement

Ángela Patricia Hernández Álvarez (14 October 1990 – 1 May 2022) was a Colombian lawyer, journalist, and politician. She served in the Departmental Assembly of Santander and was a candidate for governor of Santander.

== Biography ==
Hernández was born into a traditional family and grew up with a taste for leadership and politics. When she was appointed to the Municipal Council of Floridablanca, she was the youngest municipal councilor in Colombia. At the age of 25, she was elected to the Departmental Assembly of Santander.

=== Controversy with the Ministry of Education ===
While in the Departmental Assembly of Santander, Hernández claimed that the Ministry of National Education was advancing a "homosexual colonization" in the country's schools in response to a 2013 law that established a national teaching of school coexistence and training on the exercise of human rights. She claimed that parents in Santander had reached out to her disparaging the implementation of mixed bathrooms and uniforms, while assuring the public that she was not homophobic. However, she continued to take a stand against the idea that new customs and ideas were trampling existing, traditional ones.

=== Controversy on the LGBT flag in the Bucaramanga mayor's office ===
On 29 July 2016, the mayoral office in Bucaramanga made the decision to raise the LGBT flag in solidarity with the community amidst homophobia, rejection, and bullying in schools. Hernández questioned the decision along with educational projects which sought to include gender ideology in classes. Because of this, she was criticized for her positions on the LGBT community while claiming that the "rights of the LGBT community are also privileges". She also claimed that the Ministry of National Education was biased and that "it imposes gender ideology on schools".

=== Candidacy for governor of Santander ===
In 2019, Hernández ran for governor of Santander with the Union Party for the People, with support from the Colombian Liberal Party, on a platform of improving infrastructure and trade and fighting corruption. During her campaign, her law degree from the Corporación Universitaria de Ciencia y Desarrollo came into question. She defended herself on her personal Twitter account displaying her diploma.

== Personal life ==
Hernández was married to veterinarian Jefferson Vega Buitrago, with whom she had a son. She was diagnosed with cancer in 2020 and underwent a right mastectomy. She succumbed to breast cancer in Bucaramanga on 1 May 2022 at the age of 31.
