= Maggie Borg =

Maltese social and environmental activist (1952-2004)

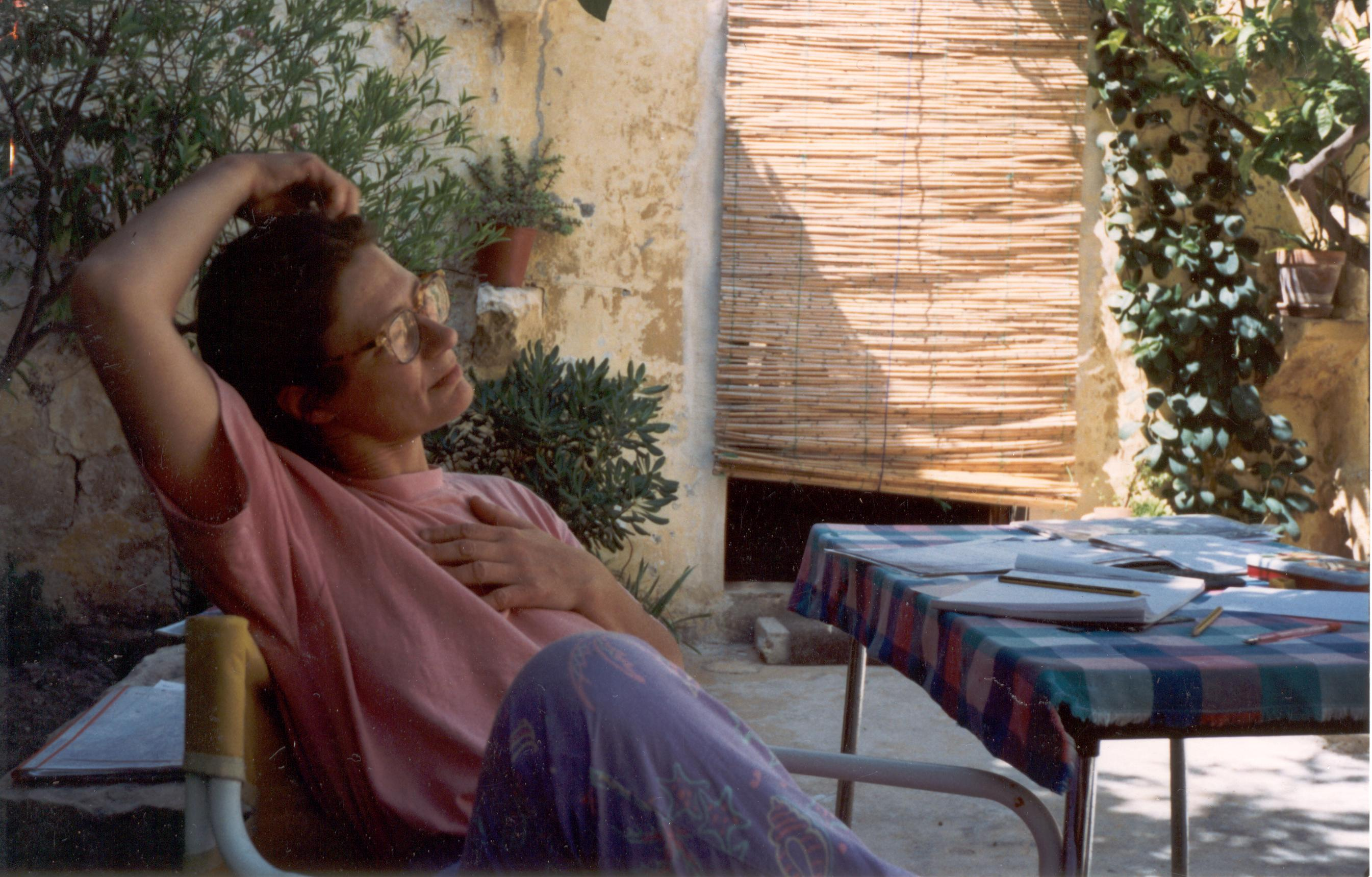
Maggie Borg at home in Zebbug in 1993

Maggie Borg (14 January 1952 – 3 August 2004) was a Maltese activist for environmental and social rights.

== Environmental activist ==
Maggie Borg was a Maltese environmentalist. She worked with Friends of the Earth (Malta) and Greenpeace Mediterranean.

Her main objectives were the promotion of recycling and clean energy in Malta and the Mediterranean countries, and the preservation of nature in rural areas. She worked with other Maltese activists such as Julian Manduca. The Maltese rock band Dripht dedicated their album Global Warning to both environmentalists.

== Biography ==
Maggie Borg was born in Cospicua on 14 January 1952. She was the eldest daughter in a family of 10 siblings. After an education at Cospicua Public School she worked as a tourist guide, a shop assistant and as a self-employed designer and manufacturer of woollen sweaters before joining Greenpeace. Borg married at a young age but the marriage ended.

She lived in Naxxar and Mosta before moving to Zebbug. She continued her education as a mature student at the University of Malta where she earned a master's degree in Sociology & Environmental Studies in 1993. She developed a course in environmental studies for the secondary school curriculum and started teaching senior classes at San Anton School. Her approach to teaching was appreciated by pupils and parents alike. Quoting Malta Independent columnist Daphne Caruana Galizia: "Her methods were considered unorthodox until her pupils began scoring 1s and 2s in their MATSEC exams."

== Death ==
Maggie Borg died of breast cancer on 3 August 2004, aged 52, after having the disease for almost ten years. She remained active until she died, supporting various causes including the Malta Cancer Foundation.
