= Karl Schembri =

Maltese writer (born 1978)

Karl Schembri (born in 1978 in Malta) is a Maltese author, journalist and humanitarian. Schembri also occupied the post of News Editor and Deputy Editor at Malta Today. He started working in journalism with In-Nazzjon and Il-Mument in 1995, moving on to Bay Radio, The Malta Independent, The Malta Independent on Sunday and Malta Today. He left Malta in 2009 to join the Palestinian news agency Ramattan in the occupied Palestinian territory.

== Career ==
Schembri's investigative journalism led to the clampdown on the trading of ancient Mesopotamian artefacts from Iraq on eBay via Malta, the first ever exposure of rampant child rape by Catholic priests in a children's institution, fraudulent faith healers, and the serious security lapses at Malta's world heritage and fine arts museums from where priceless pieces have been stolen. In an April 2006 investigation, Schembri revealed internal armed forces communications logs showing that Maltese army rescuers were given orders to “keep at a distance” from a boat carrying 200 migrants in gale-force winds, hours before 9 of them drowned and at least 20 went missing in a shipwreck off the coast of Sicily.

He has reported extensively from Libya, Kosovo, Albania, and the Occupied Palestinian Territories, and won the 2000 Malta press award for his reporting. He also contributes to The Sunday Telegraph, Russian Newsweek and The Guardian Weekly and is the founding chairman of The Journalists' Committee.

In 2009, Schembri joined Palestinian news agency Ramattan as their English service editor, first in Ramallah and then in the Gaza Strip, where he lived for four years before moving to Jordan.

Over the past years, Schembri has been based in the Middle East working as a media adviser with humanitarian organisations including Oxfam, the Norwegian Refugee Council and Save the Children. He has covered humanitarian crises in the region in Yemen, Syria, Palestine and Iraq, as well as the Syrian refugee crisis in Jordan and Lebanon.

== Writing ==
A sociology graduate from the University of Malta, he has written two novels, Taħt il-Kappa tax-Xemx in 2002 and Il-manifest tal-killer in 2006. His book of poetry Passju Taħt ix-Xita was published in 2012 as was his book of poetry in English Remember The Future, published in the US. In 2020 a children's book called It-Tifel li Salva d-Dinja (The Boy who Saved the World) was published by Merlin Publishers in Malta.

He is also the co-author of the anthology of poems Frekwenzi ta' Spriti fis-Sakra (1997) and co-editor with fellow author Adrian Grima of Id-Demm Nieżel bħax-Xita (2009) - an anthology of poems in solidarity with Palestinians published during the 22-day war on Gaza. Il-manifest tal-killer was censored by the University of Malta's radio station, Campus FM, after the management learnt that it was going to be read in the literary programme series Wara Arrigo in January 2007. Malta public library readers were also banned from lending the book outside libraries. An adaptation by Bryan Muscat was staged in October 2008 by Lemonhead Productions.

In 2019, several of his Maltese and English poems were published in Arabic translation in the book I turn every stone in the forest, (Egypt: Safsafa Publications, 2019). His poetry has been published in Arabic, Spanish, English, French, Turkish, Greek, Romanian and Slovenian translation. He has been invited to read in literature festivals in France, Australia, Nicaragua, Peru, Colombia, Indonesia, Romania and Morocco.

Fellow Maltese writer and critic Mario Azzopardi (born in 1944 in Ħamrun Malta) describes Schembri as "a pioneer in his generation that has assaulted his nation that is lubricated on hypocrisy, nepotism and corruption", while author Ramona Depares describes his fiction as "being grounded in reality".
