= Radio 101 (Malta) =

Coordinates: 35°53′20″N 14°29′39″E

NET FM (Radio 101)
Malta
- Frequency: 101.0 MHz

Ownership
- Owner: NET Media, previously known as Media.link Communications (Nationalist Party)

History
- First air date: 28 September 1991; 34 years ago

Technical information

Links
- Website: netfm.com.mt

NET FM (previously known as Radio 101) is a Maltese radio station owned by Media.link Communications, the media arm of the Nationalist Party.

== History ==
Radio 101 emerged when the government repealed the state monopoly that was given to Xandir Malta (the current PBM/PBS) in the late 1980s. The Nationalist Party had to resort to Sicily for its radio broadcasts, while it was refused to broadcast from Malta because it did not align with the state broadcaster's ideologies.

On the evening of 28 September 1991, Radio 101 started broadcasting from a studio in San Gwann. Following a speech from prime minister Eddie Fenech Adami, the station's jingle was played, followed by a cover of John Lennon's Imagine. The station's breakfast show went live on the following morning.

During the opposition government between 1996 and 1998, the station became a hotbed of PN-aligned refugees, especially to Clyde Puli's call-in programme, which exposed the Labour government's flaws. Said programme eventually became its flagship; its signature tune was the theme to 1492: Conquest of Paradise, from Greek composer Vangelis.

On 2 July 2018, the station was renamed Net FM, tying in with its sister TV outlet, NET TV. The rebranding was based on surveys the station had been conducting with Maltese and Gozitans since 2003, where its branding did not click in with some demographics, causing the need for a rename in order to increase its listener base. In conjunction with the new name, a new slogan was unveiled ("we are the change") and a new line-up.
