= Villa Rosa (St. Julian's) =

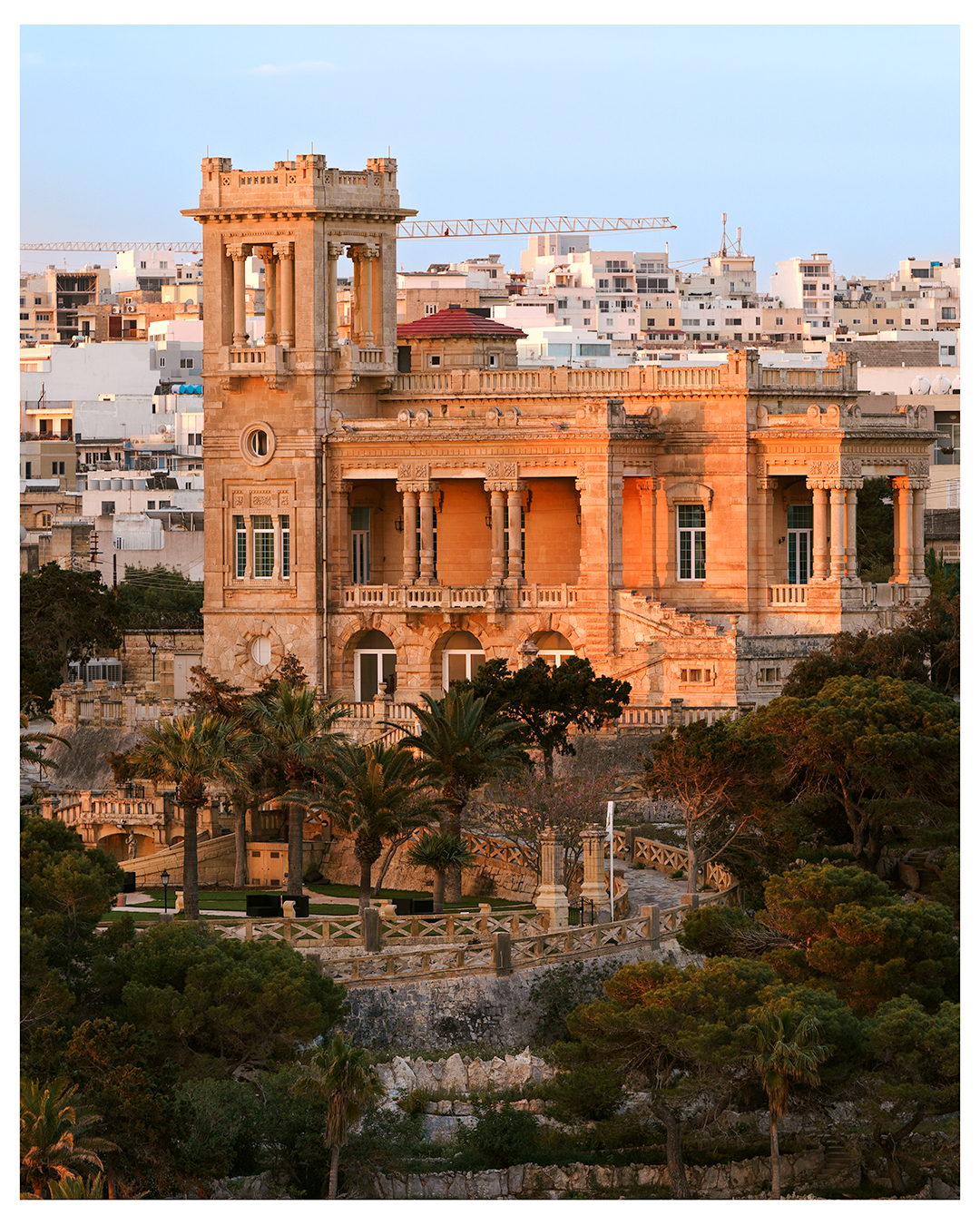
- Interactive map of the Villa Rosa area

General information
- Status: Intact
- Type: Villa
- Architectural style: Art Nouveau
- Location: St. Julian's, Malta
- Coordinates: 35°55′29.39″N 14°29′11.26″E

Design and construction
- Architect: Andrea Vassallo

Villa Rosa is a villa in Triq in-Nemes, St. Julian's, Malta, overlooking St.George's Bay. One of the few Art Nouveau mansions on the island, it was designed by architect Andrea Vassallo in the 1920s and remained largely intact, together with its gardens descending towards the bay.

Vila Rosa is listed on the National Inventory of the Cultural Property of the Maltese Islands among the monuments in St. Julian's.

== History ==
The villa was commissioned by Luigi Apap as his summer residence (he lived in Valletta in Strada Vescovo) and named after his wife Rosa Cicolari. At the time, the bay only featured St.George’s Barracks on the eastern side, and later the Corinthia hotels.

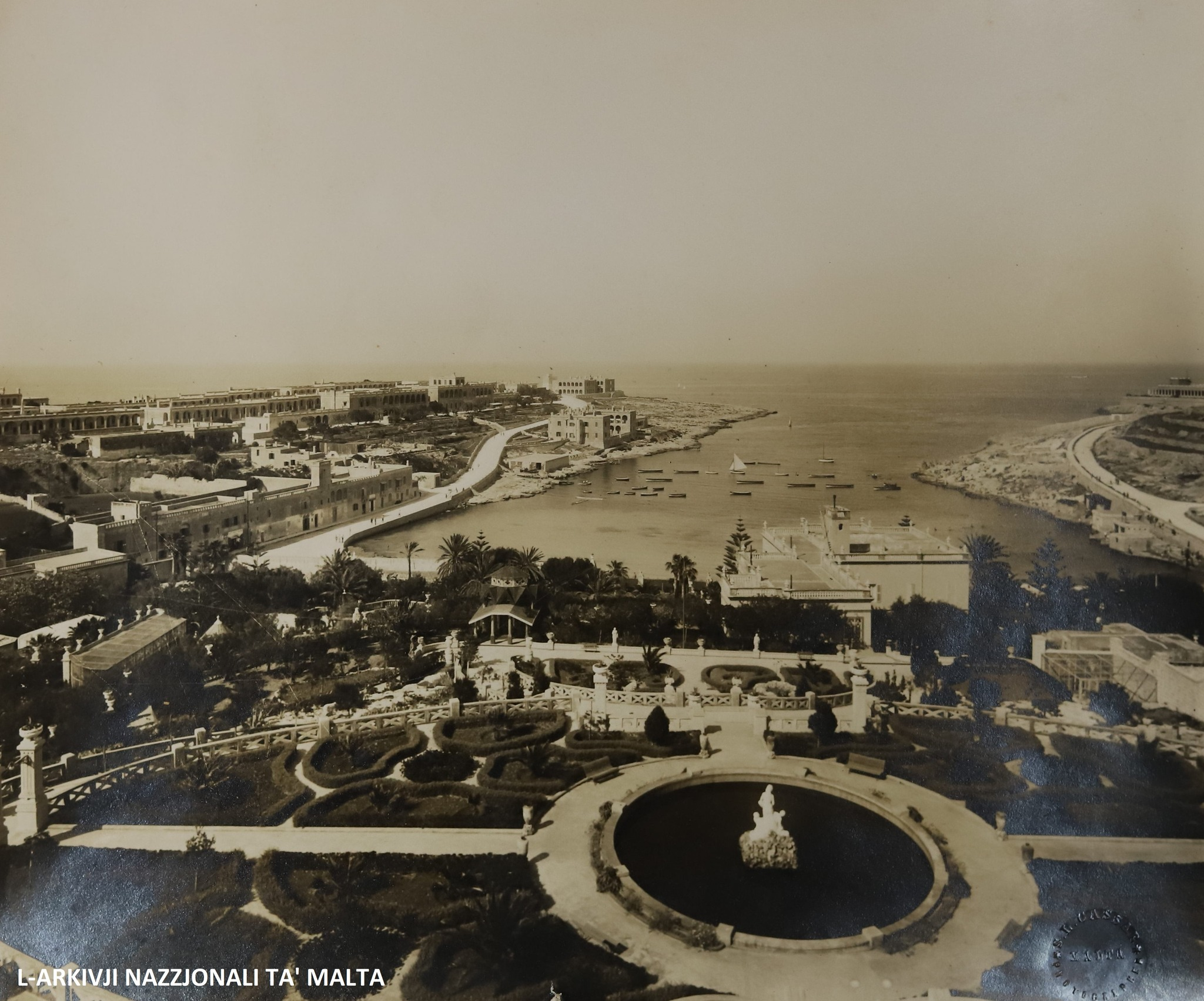

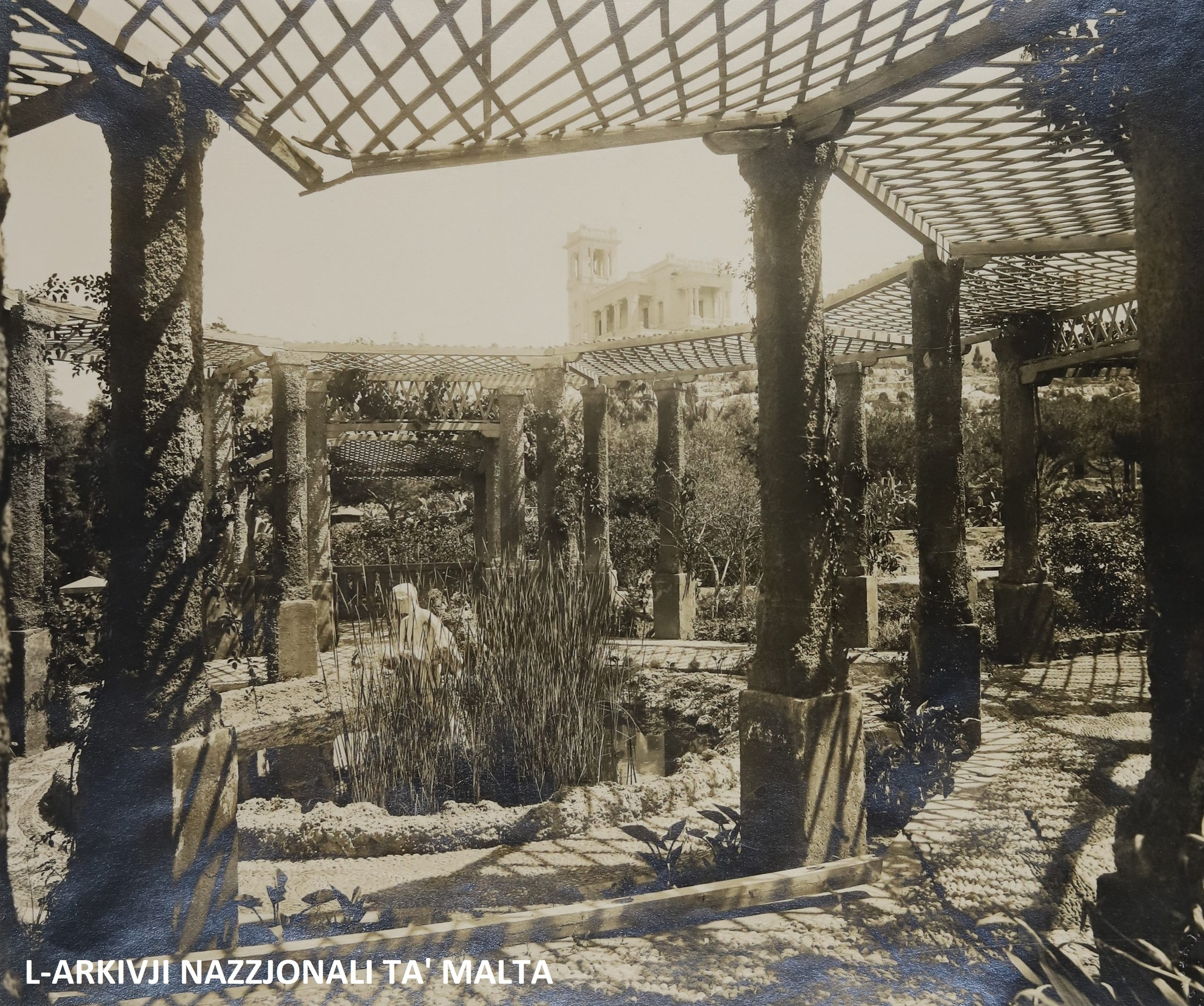

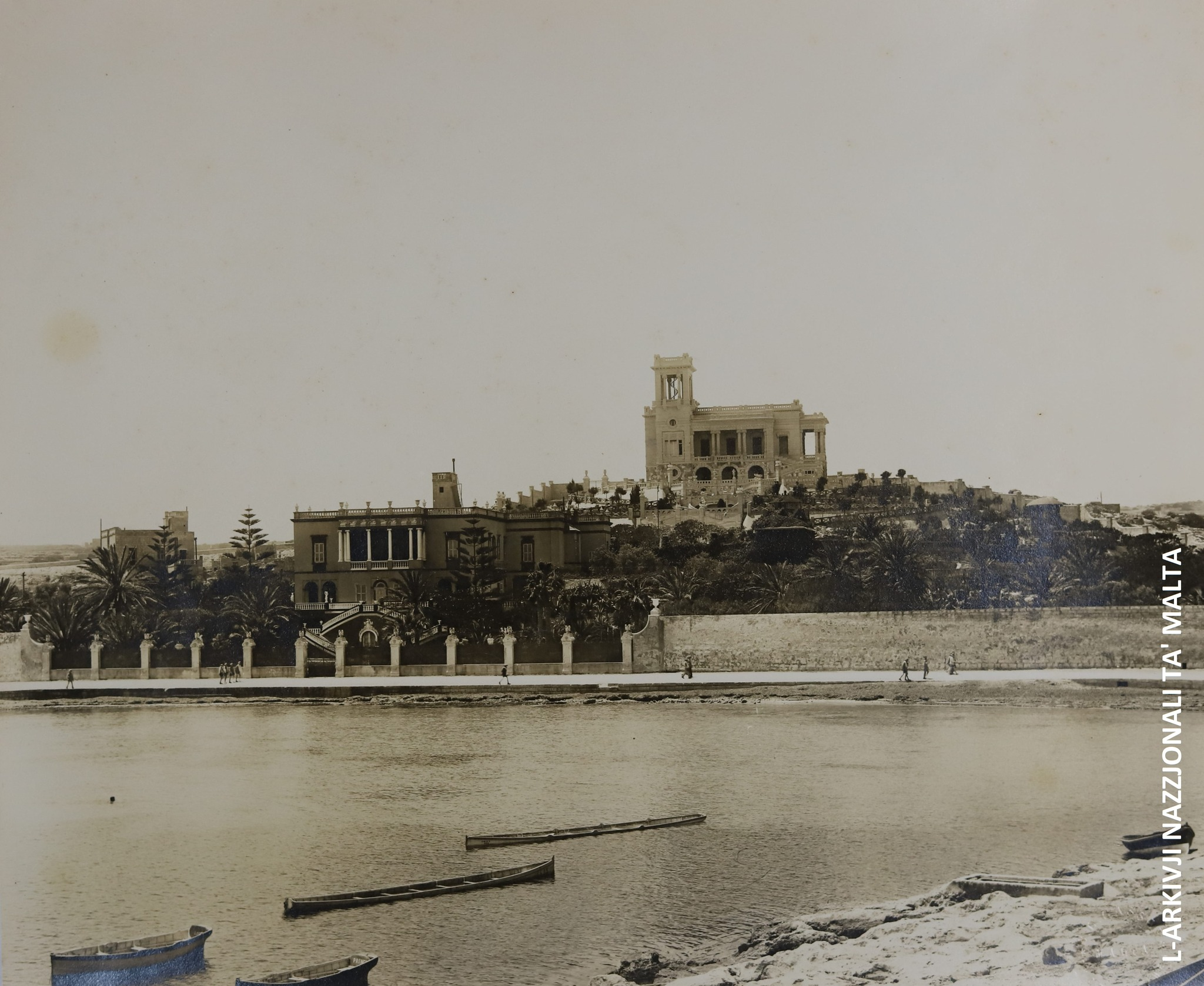

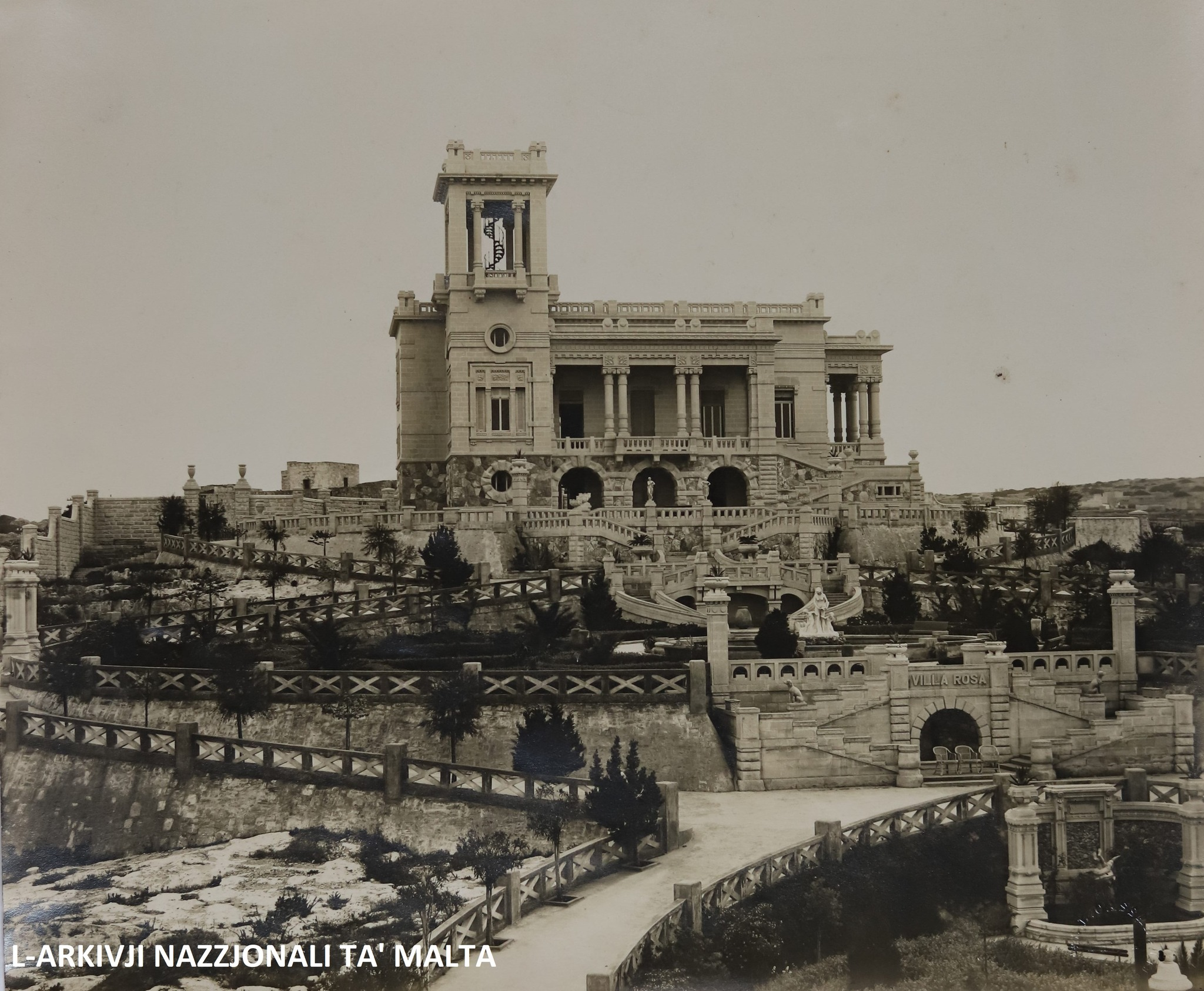

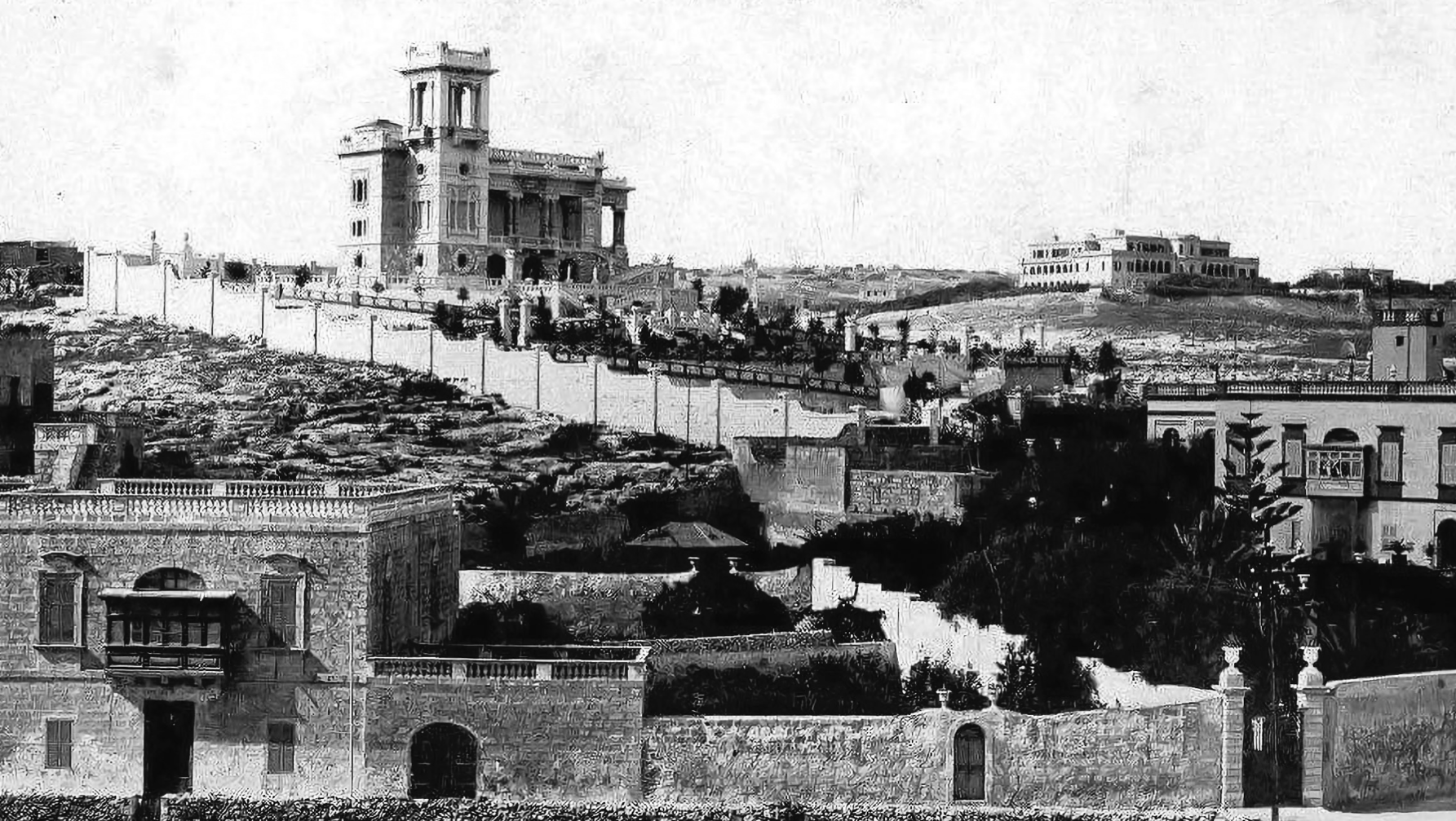

== Development projects ==
The local plans approved in August 2006 split the grounds of Villa Rosa into nine zone, of which four for tourism, residential, and commercial development, with a maximum of seven floors. The upper gardens were to be protected. The plan stated that any development should not have compromised the setting of the villa, valley, and bay. These changes anyway increased the value of the site. Villarosa belonged for about twenty years to a Sicilian family called Sgandurra and was later sold in 2009. for €34.6 million.

In October 2013 Anton Camilleri applied for a planning development in line with the local plan together with a four-floor, 56-room hotel at Cresta Quay on the east side of St. George's bay. This was approved in February 2018. The project included 15 two-storey villas with private pools in the valley area. The historical Moynihan House and Dolphin House were set to be demolished and redeveloped into a car park, restaurants, offices, and a language school, despite the environmental impact statement having concluded that Moynihan House deserved Grade 2 protection.

In May 2016, Malta Today disclosed Camilleri's plans for a 36-floor high rise, designed by Zaha Hadid, overlooking St George’s Bay.

In November 2016, the new Paceville masterplan excluded high-rise developments on Villa Rosa grounds, while endorsing three high-rise buildings on the Cresta Quay coast site, also owned by Camilleri. This masterplan is put on hold in August 2018, after it is revealed that the same consultants were working on Joseph Portelli’s Mercury House project.

In January 2022 Anton Camilleri presents a project development statement to increase floor space from 141,000 sq.m to 237,000 sq.m by opting for a high-rise development, by invoking a policy which allows hotels to rise above local plan limits. In April, during the campaign for the 2022 Maltese general election, the Lands Department transfers to Camilleri ownership of a public alley in the Villa Rosa site, allowing him to roof it over for €134,000. In August, Camilleri presents a new planning application, including the high-rise development.

In March 2023, Camilleri presents an environmental impact assessment to two towers of 35 and 27 floors housing 789 serviced apartments, 247 hotel rooms, and a total of 16,000sq.m of office space. A study sounds the alarm for negative visual impacts, including on the setting of the villa and a shadowing effect on the public beach.

In October 2024, the Government of Malta orders the Planning Authority to launch a public consultation on changes that would allow Camilleri to build his project based on the hotel derogation to local plan height limits.
