= Manduca (surname) =

Manduca is a surname. Notable people with the surname include:

- Gustavo Manduca (born 1980), Brazilian footballer and manager
- Jorge Manduca (born 1979), Argentine footballer
- Julian Manduca (1958–2005), Maltese environmentalist
- Paul Manduca (born 1951), British businessman
