= Julian Manduca =

Environmentalist from Malta

Julian Manduca (2 July 1958 – 17 May 2005) was one of the foremost environmentalists in Malta. He was part of the management team of an ethical trade organisation and consultant editor with liberal and pro-environment newspaper MaltaToday.

A former Friends of the Earth Malta activist, Manduca never feared to express his concerns in a country where the urban sprawl has eaten away most of the natural terrain, criticising adverse political decisions that favoured building magnates rather than the silent countryside. Active with the Maltese Green Party Alternattiva Demokratika, in 1992 he chained himself with fourteen others at the gates of the Auberge de Castille, the Maltese Premier's office, in protest against Malta's shameful electoral system due to its 16% threshold. Malta remains the only European Union country with only two parties represented in parliament.

Nicknamed Choppy, he was known for his commitment to the University of Malta Film Club. He was married to German actress Irene Christ. In 2002, together with Christ, he co-founded the theatrical group Actinghouse Productions.

Manduca died suddenly on 17 May 2005 in Malta.

His loss was the second in a short spell amongst committed Maltese environmentalists, following the demise of Greenpeace activist Maggie Borg. Maltese rock band Dripht dedicated their album Global Warning to both environmentalists. His drive, honesty, openness, and commitment have inspired many other Maltese environmentalists to carry on the crusade against over development on the Maltese Islands.

In 2006, Malta Today launched the Julian Manduca Award, for cultural, literary and environmental endeavours. These awards went to Friends of the Earth (Malta), Walter Micallef and Karl Schembri.
