= Anton Camilleri tal-Franċiż =

Maltese entrepreneur

Anton Camilleri tal-Franċiż (born in Mqabba) is a Maltese entrepreneur and real estate developer.

Camilleri is also a member of the board of directors of the Malta Development Association (MDA).

== Family ==
The head of the group is Anton Camilleri tal-Franċiż, from Mqabba, alongside his first son Adelbert Camilleri. According to family lore, the nickname refers to an ancestor who had joined the French army during the brief French occupation of Malta in 1798-1800.

Anton Camilleri's father worked in aircraft maintenance with the British Navy. His father in law encouraged him to get into the quarry business, which was booming in Mqabba. He died when Anton was 12, leaving to him to run the five-employee business. He later moved into the real estate business, obtaining his first loan at age 19.

At a time, the business operated as Camilleri Brothers, with Anton alongside Charles. They later parted ways, though they remain join shareholders in a number of enterprises.

== Company profile ==
The AC Group is a real estate, development and quarrying company in Malta. It presents itself as a three-generation family business from Swieqi.

The A. Camilleri Group of Companies includes, among others, AC Group, AC Enterprises, Garnet Investments, Camcas, Caman Properties, AM Developments, ACS Developments, and Camilleri Group (no relation to the catering company with the same name). These companies hold assets for some €90 million, although they also have considerable liabilities in debt and trade, hence with a much lower net asset value.

== Real estate projects ==
In 2018, Camilleri applied to develop a tract of garrigue in Żonqor, Marsaskala, part of George Pullicino's 2006 "rationalisation" of local plans. The Planning Authority approved the construction by GAP Projects and Polidano of 135 apartments, 180 garages, five storeys over 5,000sqm. The building was constructed in 2024-2025, before all permits were even approved, and then sanctioned with a fine of mere 31,300€.

In Fgura, Camilleri is applying to rezone 23,000sqm of undeveloped land, creating "a maze of flats and roads in the only green lung left in town, also a victim of rationalisation", according to the Times of Malta.

Both for Żonqor and Fgura, Camilleri was represented by architect Colin Zammit of the Maniera Group. Camilleri and Zammit also applied to develop a "pedestrian street" in Ħamrun.

In 2020 Camilleri was allowed to develop a green space in Santa Luċija. The 2018 project for five-storeys was approved, despite a maximum height policy of three-storeys and previous refusals by the PA of applications of that size. Camilleri was being represented by Labour Party president Daniel Jose Micallef, who had pledged in public for more urban open spaces.

Besides employing Labour Party president Micallef, in March 2023 the press disclosed that then Lands Minister Silvio Schembri had used a local office in Siġġiewi, owned by Anton Camilleri, for as little as 3.50€ a day. The Minister was cleared of conflict to interest in August 2025.

In early 2024, Malta's Courts revoked a development permit for a large complex in Birżebbuġa Girghien or Tal-Papa area. The Shift reported that developers Camilleri and Paul Attard (GAP Developments) had submitted piecemeal applications to circumvent policies, and had blocked access to historical rock-cut chambers and WWII shelters. he block had already been partly built and sold by the time of the court decisions.

=== Villa Rosa ===
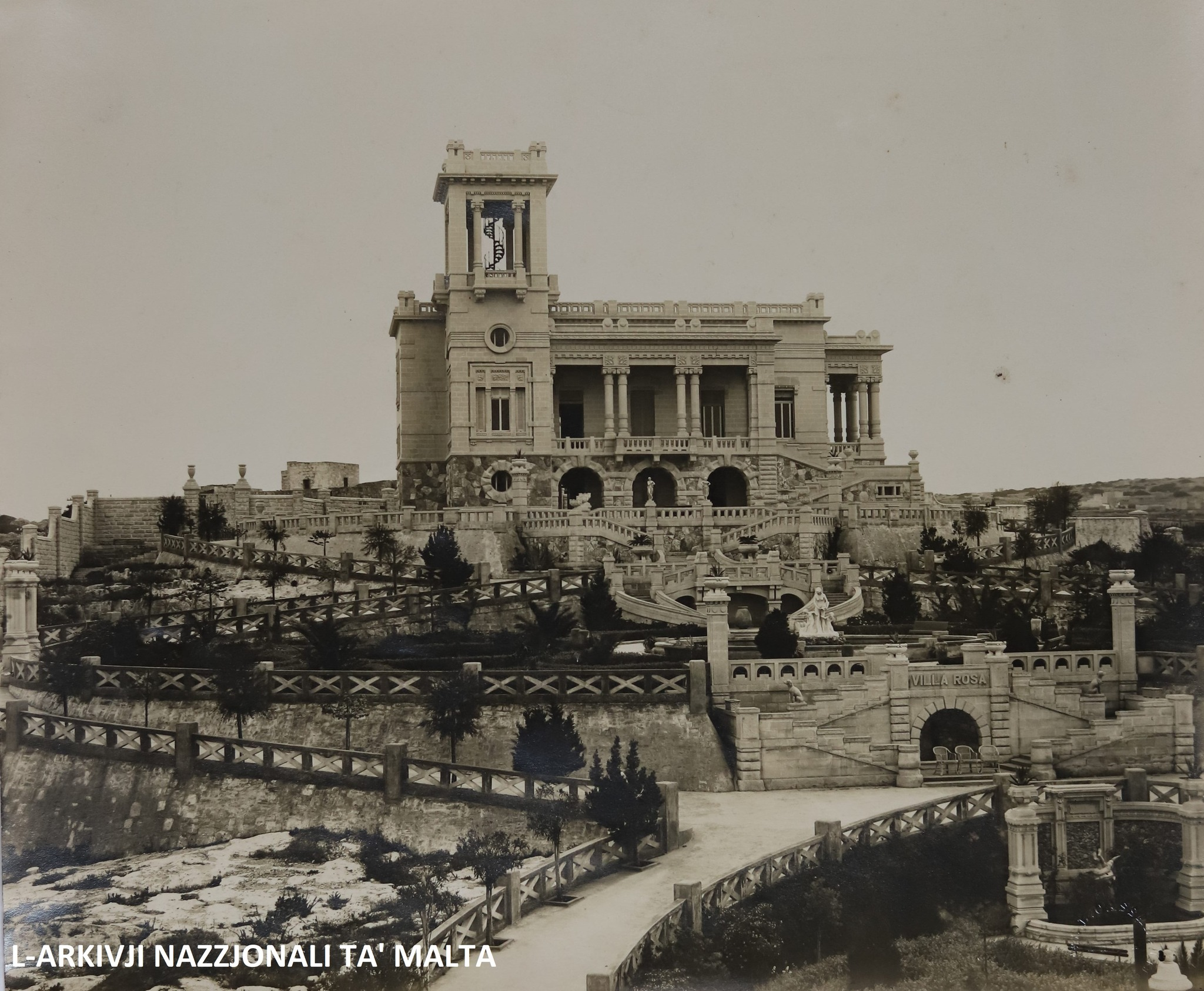
Villa Rosa

In November 2009, Camilleri's Vic Bon company (later Garnet Investments) bought Villa Rosa's grounds for a total of €34.6 million. In March 2023 it applied to build two towers of 35 and 27 floors on the site of St. George's Bay. Anton Camilleri aims to invest some €305 million in the project - an amount that seems difficult for any local company in Malta to fork out.

To connect the whole project together, Camilleri needed to acquire a small public alley. Two days before the 2022 Maltese general election, the Lands Authority (overseen by Schembri) transferred its ownership to Camilleri for mere €134,000, allowing him to roof it over. An internal audi report raised various issues with the sale, including special conditions and low sale price.
