= Media.link Communications =

Media Company

Coordinates: 35°53′20″N 14°29′39″E

NET Media (Media.link Communications Company Limited)
- Company type: Private
- Industry: Mass media
- Headquarters: Pietà, Malta
- Area served: Malta
- Owner: Nationalist Party

NET Media, previously known as Media.link Communications Company Limited is a Maltese mass media company owned by the Nationalist Party.

Its operations include NET Television, NET FM, and the In-Nazzjon and Il-Mument newspapers.

It also previously operated the online newspaper MaltaRightNow.com (rebranded to NET News), publishing company PIN Publications, and mobile virtual network operator Ping Mobile (active 2012–2013). The online newspaper was subsequently changed to the website netnews.com.mt.

== See also ==
- One Productions, counterpart media company owned by the Labour Party
