= Michael Stivala =

Maltese real estate developer

- Born: 1974 (age 51–52); Malta
- Occupation: Real estate developer
- Known for: President of the Malta Development Association and CEO of the Carmelo Stivala Group

Michael Stivala (born 1974) is a Maltese real estate developer and president of the Malta Development Association. He is the CEO of the Carmelo Stivala Group. He hired disgraced former prime minister as a consultant in 2020 for which he was criticised by the media.

== Early years and education ==
Born 1974, Michael Stivala studied at Mount Carmel College, Malta (1984-1990) and at the Institute for Tourism Studies, Malta (1990-1992).

== Career ==
Until 2017 he was the director of Stivala Operators Ltd, a hospitality company operating among others Bayview Hotel and Apartments, Blubay Hotel and Apartments, and Sliema Hotel. From 1998 till 2022 he was Cluster General Manager of ST Hotels Malta.

In September 2017 he was appointed Chairman and CEO of the Stivala Group. Michael Stivala also served as vice-president of the Malta Hotels and Restaurants Association (MHRA) in 2014-2015. From 2010 till 2021, he was also secretary-general of the Malta Development Association (MDA.)

In 2022, Michael Stivala was elected President of the Malta Development Association (MDA), the representative body for real estate developers in the country, after having been acting president since 2021, succeeding to Sandro Chetcuti.

=== Carmelo Stivala Group ===
The Carmelo Stivala Group was established in August 2017, and headed since then by Michael Stivala. The Stivala Group own and operate five hotels on the Sliema Strand, and are involved in the development of properties for sale and rental, particularly in Gżira and Sliema.

The group is run by his four sons Michael, Martin John (1972), Ivan (1978) and Carlo (1989). Carlo Stivala (born 1989) divested from the group in November 2020 against a €81.2 million compensation.

According to its 2023 financial statements, the Stivala Group generated a profit before tax of €30 million in 2022 and €77 million in 2023. It had a deferred tax liability of €28,589,635 by the end of 2023. The group's properties amount to €352,558,968 i.e. 80% of the company's assets.

== Criticism ==
Stivala employs disgraced former prime minister Joseph Muscat as a consultant, paid tens of thousands of euro per month, since a few months after Muscat resigned in 2020. Stivala stated he had "no regrets" in doing so, claiming Muscat was "innocent until found guilty".

Independent politician Arnold Cassola claimed this was payback time for the illegalities Stivala's companies had been allowed to perpetrate when Muscat was prime minister. Stivala sued Cassola for libel and lost the case.

By 2022, Michael Stivala had filed 11 applications for outdoor catering areas along Triq ix-Xatt between Gżira and Sliema, which were all approved by the Planning Authority. They cater to various businesses owned by Stivala including the Bayview Hotel and the Sliema Hotel, while encroaching on public space on the seaside promenade.

== Development projects ==
- Townsquare Development: Stivala Group is involved in the development of Townsquare, a large-scale residential and commercial project in Sliema.
- Novotel Hotel: The group is also developing Malta's first Novotel hotel in Gżira.
- ST Tower: Stivala Group is also involved in the completion of ST Tower, a high-rise commercial property in Ta' Xbiex.

In 2023, Stivala bid for a 65-year concession on the old Valletta Fish Market (Pixxkerija), proposing to invest some €38.5 million for its revamping.

== See also ==
- 3, Triq ix-Xatt, Marsaskala
