= Sandro Chetcuti =

Maltese real estate developer

- Occupations: Property developer; lobbyist
- Known for: Founding President of the Malta Development Association
- Title: Honorary President, Malta Development Association

Sandro Chetcuti is a Maltese real estate developer, founder and former president of the Malta Developers' Association (2010-2021).

== Career ==
Chetcuti co-founded the Malta Developers' Association (MDA) in 2010 alongside former PN minister Michael Falzon, at a time when no dedicated property lobby existed. In 2014 he succeeded Falzon as president, advocating for the reduction of regulation on developers.

Under Chetcuti’s leadership, the MDA emerged as one of Malta’s most powerful industry lobbies, known for its direct dialogue with the new Labour government led by Joseph Muscat.

In 2013, the Muscat government appointed Chetcuti to Malta's Building Regulations Board, despite potential conflicts of interestas a developer.

Chetcuti also served as a government consultant on property market and planning matters, a role compensated at around €19,000 annually.

Chetcuti promoted initiatives like the “Transfer of Gross Floor Area Ratio” to balance urban development and village preservation.

He also spoke out on urban redevelopment issues, such as the controversial Paceville masterplan, urging authorities to ensure fair compensation in expropriation plans.

Chetcuti also chaired the Property Malta Foundation, a public-private initiative aimed at promoting Malta among foreign property investors Malta.

In 2021, after more than seven years, Chetcuti stepped down and was named honorary president. He was succeeded by Michael Stivala, with Chetcuti’s son Leon Chetcuti later appointed as CEO of MDA.

Chetcuti and the MDA have been subject to criticism for their political influence and prioritization of development, with critics pointing to environmental and regulatory concerns.

== Major development projects ==
Zonqor Point land in Marsaskala

Chetcuti has shown longstanding interest in a 7,850-square-metre tract of land in Marsaskala, adjacent to the Zonqor Point area. Although he has not yet acquired the land, he signed a promise-of-sale agreement in 2006, which has been regularly renewed. This area is near the proposed site for the American University of Malta campus. Chetcuti has expressed intentions to develop hotels on this land, describing the area as "shabby and unused" and unsuitable for agricultural purposes.

Xemxija 13-storey tower proposal

In 2024, Chetcuti's company, Chetgau Development Ltd, submitted an outline development application for a 13-storey tower in Xemxija, comprising 300 apartments. The proposal faced significant opposition from residents and environmentalists due to concerns about encroachment on protected garrigue and proximity to archaeological sites. The Planning Authority suspended the application, and the project's future remains uncertain.

== Assault conviction ==
In March 2010, Sandro Chetcuti was involved in a physical altercation with Vince Farrugia, then Director-General of Malta's General Retailers and Traders Union (GRTU). Farrugia had suspected Chetcuti of leaking information to Joseph Muscat.

Initially charged with attempted murder, the Attorney-General later downgraded the charge to causing grievous bodily harm. In September 2013, Chetcuti was acquitted of the more serious charges but was found guilty of causing slight injuries, harassment, and threats. He was sentenced to one month's imprisonment, suspended for one year, and was placed under a €1,000 protection order not to approach or contact Farrugia for a year.

Farrugia was also investigated for perjury or fabricating evidence during the proceedings. Charges were brought in 2018. The case is ongoing.
