= Malta Development Association =

Maltese real estate development business organization

- Abbreviation: MDA
- Formation: 2010
- Legal status: Not-for-profit organization
- Location: Triq l-Orsolini, Gwardamangia, Pietà
- Region served: Malta
- President: Michael Stivala
- Parent organization: Build Europe
- Website: mda.com.mt

The Malta Development Association (MDA) is a business organization representing the real estate development industry in Malta. The MDA has become one of Malta’s most influential industry lobbies, frequently engaging with the Maltese government on planning policy, tax incentives, and construction safety.

The Malta Developers' Association (MDA) was established in 2010 and gathers most real estate developers and estate agents. It rebranded from "Developers'" to "Development" in late 2013.

The MDA aims "to act as a potent force bringing about growth and development", linking "private real estate developers to the relevant state authorities and to customers". It claims to promote "responsible, sustainable development" via "legislative advocacy, educational programs and professional networking".

Following early chairmanship by Michael Falzon, from 2014 till 2021 the MDA was headed by Sandro Chetcuti. He was followed by Michael Stivala, first acting, and then elected President since 2022. Stivala is supported by Chetcuti's son Leo as MDA CEO.

In 2017 the MDA joined the Property Malta Foundation, a public-private initiative aimed to promote Malta among foreign real estate investors.

== Recent positions and initiatives ==
In April 2025, the MDA warned it would blacklist unlicensed or “rogue” contractors whose practices threatened the industry’s reputation. It also urged government to raise building standards even if this slowed development, citing public safety and professionalism concerns.

In January 2025, the MDA criticized magisterial inquiries that target companies based on unproven media reports, calling for legal reforms to safeguard due process.

In June 2025, the MDA proposed a scheme allowing developers to transfer gross floor area rights from historic village cores to less sensitive areas, a concept that drew strong criticism from heritage NGO Din l-Art Ħelwa, who called it a “negation of planning regulation.”

In June 2025, the MDA publicly considered organizing a protest to express frustration that its calls for reform were being disregarded by authorities.

In August 2025, the MDA publicly criticized Malta’s Strategic Plan for Environment and Development (SPED), arguing it was "not based on hard facts" and rushed before the release of the national census data.

== Criticism ==
According to Moviment Graffitti, the MDA "is lobby group aggressively lobbying for the interests of developers, contractors and big landlords. Along the years, its members have bankrolled political parties and dictated government policy in the spheres of planning, construction and the environment. This has stifled the introduction of effective regulations and engendered arrogance and impunity." The result, according to Graffitti, include "hellish urban spaces, a disappearing natural environment, a rapidly declining quality of life and numerous deaths at the hands of the construction industry.”

Amid concerns over unchecked development, in 2024 fourteen NGOs called on the Prime Minister to overhaul Malta’s planning appeals system, asserting that developers — including powerful associations like the MDA — benefit from loopholes that allow construction to proceed despite pending appeals.

== MDA Council ==
Executive

- Michael Stivala, President
- Denise Xuereb, Vice-President
- Paul Attard, Secretary General
- Alfred Camilleri, Treasurer
- Pierre Galea, Assistant Secretary General and Members Office
- Leon Chetcuti, CEO (son of Sandro Chetcuti

Council Members

- Anton Camilleri tal-Franċiż
- Malcolm Mallia
- Pio Vassallo
- Euchar Vella
