= Friends of the Earth (Malta) =

Moviment għall-Ambjent, Friends of the Earth Malta (founded 1985), formerly known as Żgħażagħ għall-Ambjent, is a committee of environmental activists in Malta. The group was first set up as an umbrella organisation for various youth and environmental groups but soon developed into its present form.

== History ==
The group was first set up in 1985 as an umbrella organisation for various youth and environmental groups, but soon developed into a committee of activists. Popularity and media coverage were first gained in November 1985, when members of the group were attacked during a protest against developments on beaches and in the countryside. Since then activities have focused mainly on issues of land use, threats posed by tourism, energy, pollution, waste and sustainable livelihoods.

In 1991, Moviment għall-Ambjent became part of Friends of the Earth International, a network of groups from 71 countries. FoE Malta is an independent organisation, distinct from any political party. It is not directly affiliated with any other environmental group in Malta, however, it has worked with a number of other NGOs on particular issues of common concern.

== Recognition ==
FoE Malta received the Julian Manduca Award for their significant contribution to environmentalism in Malta and the Golden Star Award from the European Commission for their project ”New European Citizens! Televised Debate and International Workshop”.

FoE Malta is part of the 30 national organisations that Friends of the Earth Europe represents and unites at the European level.

== Campaigns ==
The major campaign issues of Friends of the Earth Malta are:

- Climate change
- Land issues
- GMOs
- Water
- Waste
- Safer chemicals
- Social and environmental justice
