= NET (Maltese TV channel) =

Maltese terrestrial TV channel

NET Television
- Former NET Television logo
- Country: Malta
- Headquarters: Pietà, Malta

Programming
- Language: Maltese

Ownership
- Owner: NET Media, previously known as Media.link Communications (Nationalist Party)

History
- Launched: 10 June 1998

Links
- Website: netondemand.mt

Availability

Terrestrial
- Free-to-air: 43 (UHF)
- GO: 102
- Melita: 102

NET Television (normally shortened to NET) is a free-to-air terrestrial television station in Malta owned by NET Media (previously known as Media.link Communications), the media arm of the Nationalist Party. It started broadcasting in 1998 from Pietà, Malta.

NET Television is also one of the most watched television channels, with it being the 3rd most viewed channel in Malta (7.88% of the population) as of May 2019. Its main competitor is One Television; usually, both stations release communiqués on their official websites, often at the same time, saying that they are the most-watched channel; however, per a 2023 Times of Malta analysis of items from both channels, NET wins by a slighter margin. Still, both stations have a smaller audience alone than Television Malta.

== History ==
The government liberalised the television market in 1991 by granting licences to the two parties. Following the launch of Super One (now One Television) by the Labour Party, the Nationalist Party followed in 1998 with NET TV, precisely when the party lost at the polls to Alfred Sant. In 2002, the channel premiered a remake of F'Baħar Wieħed, a Malta Television drama series from 1976, with two of its original actors intact.

In its early years, as of 2004, NET TV's parent company lost Lm1.9 million, without witnessing a break even period. It cut some of its losses between 1999 and 2002 to achieve some form of turnaround. Its ratings fell starting in 2007, ending in fifth place on popularity rankings; in 2009, it was behind Italian channel Canale 5.

The Nationalist Party started a fundraising campaign in July 2015 to convert the channel to high definition, in an upgrading project worth €500,000 in equipment; donations of various quantitites (up to €25) were made by phone calls and text messages. In July 2018, party media chief Pierre Portelli gained a slot on the channel to air a programme produced by his wife's company, Watermelon Media, which raised concerns about party members over conflict of interest.

== Criticism and fines ==
The Labour Party, who owns One Television, a competing channel, has historically been critical of NET TV's reports of the party's activities. Footage of an MLP mass meeting was shown on 10 June 2004; on 16 June, the party asked the Broadcasting Authority to examine NET TV's showing, which had a caption saying that Labour had the majority.

In November 2007, NET Television was fined, paying Lm600 in libel damages to architect Lawrence Mintoff, who had been libelled in a 13 November 1998 NET News bulletin. According to Mintoff, the bulletin carried footage of him entering the Labour Party headquarters (its rival channel One is owned by Labour), allegations that were claimed by Mintoff as being false.
