= In-Nazzjon =

Daily newspaper in Malta

- Type: Daily
- Owner(s): Media.link Communications (Nationalist Party)
- Political alignment: Nationalist Party
- Language: Maltese
- Country: Malta
- Sister newspapers: Il-Mument

In-Nazzjon (lit. "The Nation") is a daily newspaper in Malta. It is published by Media.link Communications, a mass media holding company owned by the Nationalist Party. Its sister publication is Il-Mument.
