= Malta Today =

English newspaper in Malta

- Type: Weekly newspaper
- Format: Tabloid
- Owner: MediaToday Ltd
- Founded: 19 November 1999
- Political alignment: Liberal, Pro-Europe
- Language: English
- Headquarters: San Ġwann
- Country: Malta
- Website: maltatoday.com.mt

Malta Today is a twice-weekly English language newspaper which was first published in 1999, and started out as a Friday newspaper.

== History ==
Malta Today was first published on Friday, 19 November 1999. It was edited by Saviour Balzan, and intended to provide an alternative to the English-language press in circulation, such as the Times of Malta and the Malta Independent.

Initially published weekly on Fridays, the paper was then published on Sundays from 2001, with an additional Wednesday midweek paper being reintroduced in 2007.

The sister Maltese-language paper Illum was first published in 2006.

In 2010, MaltaToday launched its internet news portal, and is the second most popular local news portal.

The current editorial lineup includes Kurt Sansone as Executive Editor, with Saviour Balzan as Managing Editor. The online editor is Karl Azzopardi. The print edition also includes a food magazine called Gourmet Today.
