= The Malta Independent =

National newspaper published daily in Malta

The Malta Independent is a national newspaper published daily in Malta. It was started in 1992. The paper publishes an online version branded as Malta Independent Online.
