= Ħamrun Sporting F.C. =

Maltese Association Football Club

Ħamrun Sporting
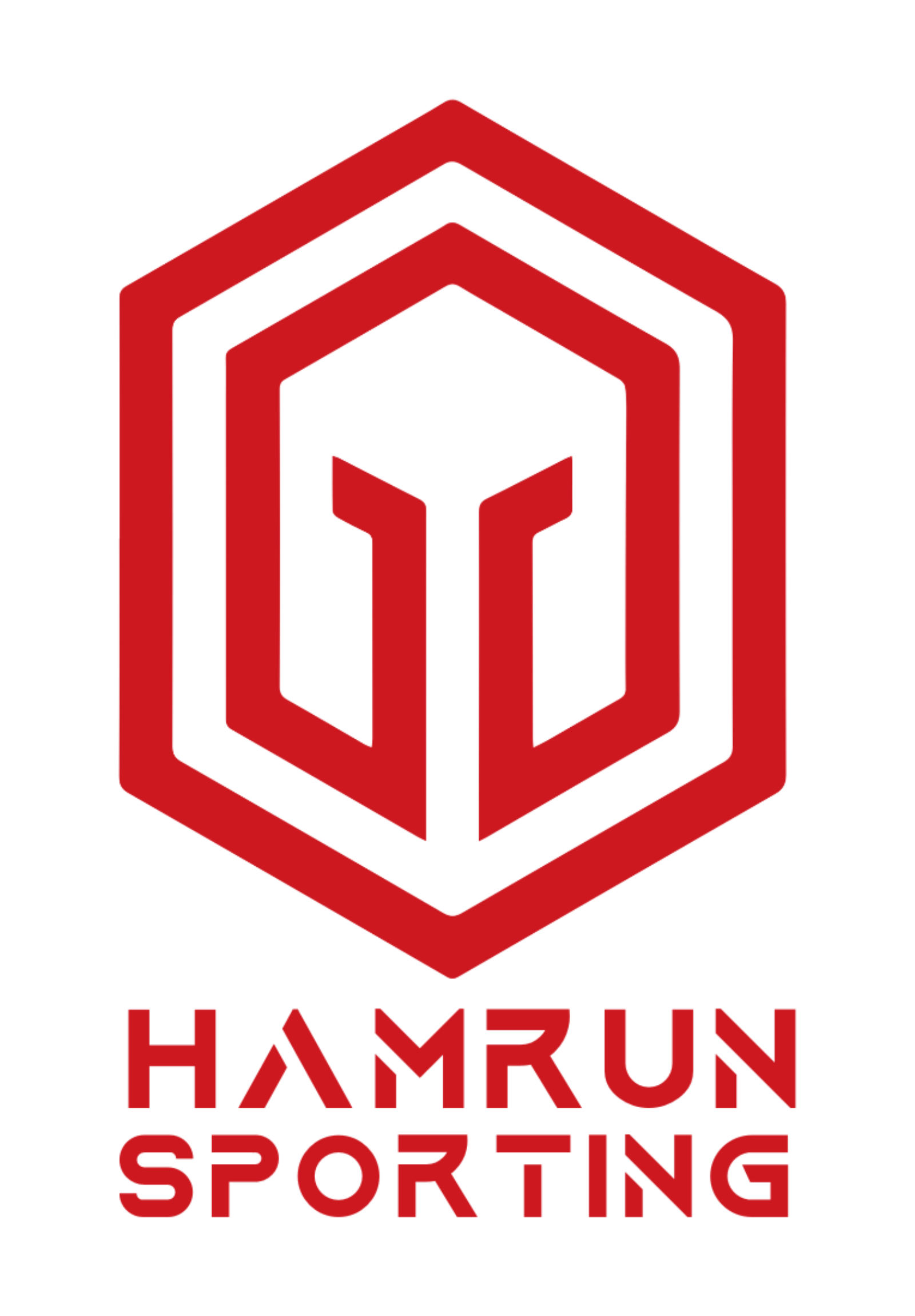
- Full name: Ħamrun Sporting Football Club
- Nicknames: Tas-Sikkina, Ta' Werwer
- Founded: 1 July 2022; 4 years ago
- League: MAFA 2nd Division
- 2025–26: 4th
- Website: https://hsfc.mt
Home colours	Away colours	Third colours

Ħamrun Sporting Football Club, commonly referred to as Ħamrun Sporting, is a sports organisation based in Ħamrun, Malta best known for its men’s non-league football team.

Founded with the ambition to go beyond football, it was established to serve as a platform for community engagement through sports. Its vision is to cultivate a dynamic and inclusive environment that promotes participation in a variety of athletic and recreational activities.

== History ==
=== Early Years ===
Ħamrun Sporting Football Club traces its origins back to 2022, when it was founded under the name FC Ħamrun Amateurs. The club was created to provide a structured and supportive environment for football enthusiasts in Ħamrun, a town with a strong tradition of community spirit and cultural pride.

From its first season, the club prioritised grassroots development, focusing on local talent, fair play, and accessible participation for players of all ages and backgrounds. Competing in the Malta Amateur Football Association, the club quickly established itself as one of the most respected teams at non-league level.

In 2023, this dedication to sportsmanship was formally recognised when the club was awarded the MAFA Fair Play Award, honouring the team’s commitment to respect and discipline on and off the field.

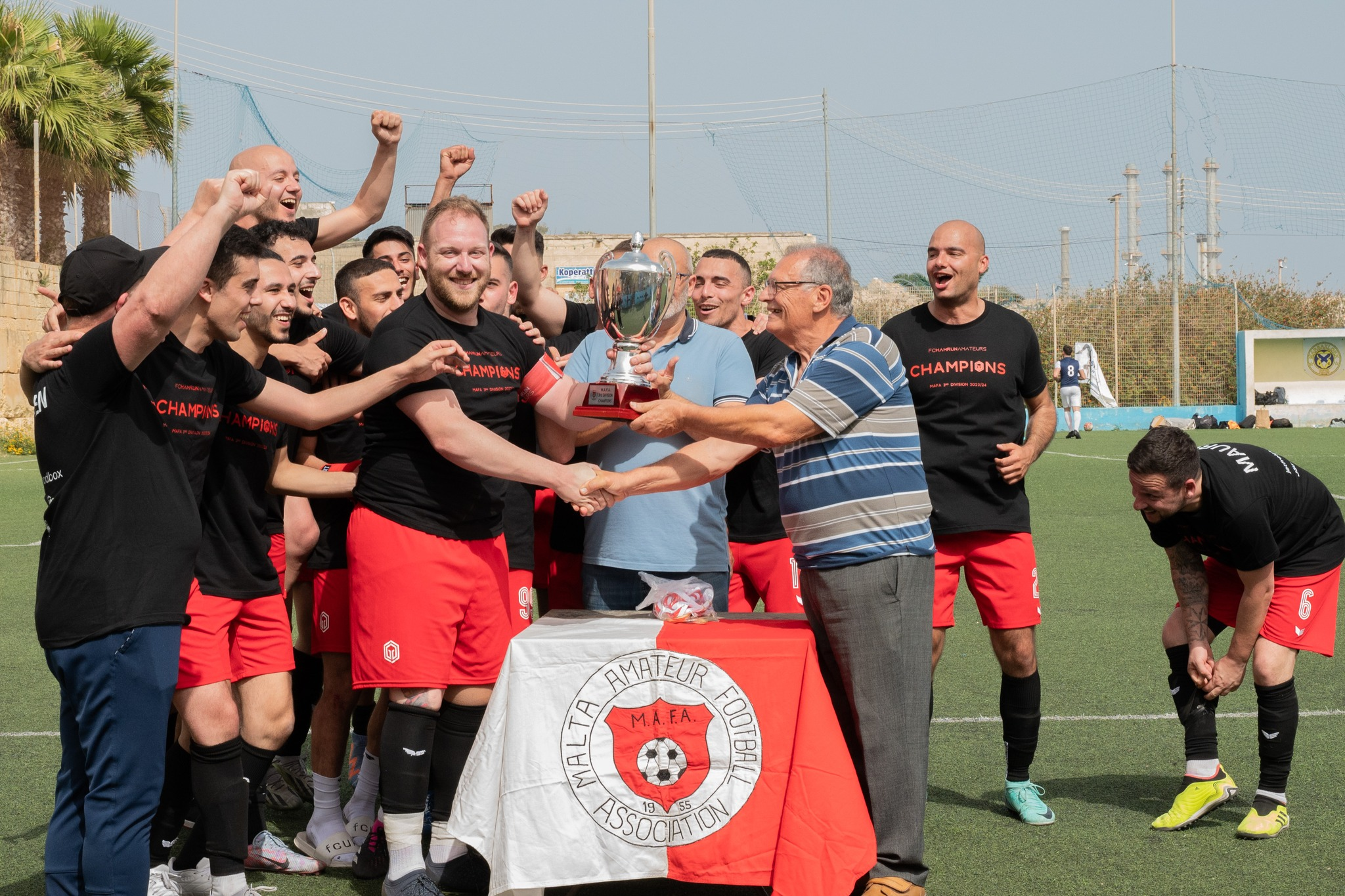
Ħamrun Sporting MAFA 3rd Division Champions Ceremony

A major milestone in the club’s growth came in 2023 when it was officially recognised as a Voluntary Organisation by the Commissioner for Voluntary Organisations in Malta, under registration number VO/2365. This recognition strengthened the club’s governance framework and eligibility for national voluntary sector initiatives.

The club’s early sporting highlight came in 2024 when winning the MAFA 3rd Division Championship, marking its first major title and securing promotion to a higher division. This success reflected the club’s steady progress and the strong backing of players, coaches, volunteers, and the local community.

=== Rebranding and Growth ===
Following its first league title and growing reputation, the club rebranded as Ħamrun Sporting Football Club in 2025. The new name signified a broader vision, to transform from a local football team into a wider sporting community that serves as a hub for participation, talent development, and social engagement in Ħamrun.

Under the new identity, Ħamrun Sporting began strengthening its club structure, introducing clearer management roles and expanding partnerships with local stakeholders and technology partners. The club also renewed its commitment to youth pathways, community outreach, and the integration of modern sports technology at grassroots level.

On the pitch, the team continues to compete in the MAFA competitions. Off the pitch, the club’s evolving identity reflects its role as a unifying force within the town, promoting belonging and pride for supporters of all ages.

=== International Exposure ===
As part of its continued development, Ħamrun Sporting Football Club began expanding its activities beyond Malta, with the aim of providing players and officials with international sporting experiences while establishing relationships with football organisations overseas.

A significant milestone was reached in September 2026, when the club organised its first-ever international training camp, held in Skiathos, Greece, between 18 and 20 September 2026. The initiative represented a new stage in the club's development and included training sessions, media engagements, networking activities, sporting exchanges and an international friendly against Atletico Skiathos.

The initiative attracted media coverage in Malta prior to the club's departure, with Malta Sport and Malta Daily reporting on Ħamrun Sporting's first international training camp and its wider objective of developing relationships with clubs outside Malta.

The international friendly was played on 19 September 2026 at Skiathos Municipal Stadium, with the match also attracting coverage in Greece. Greek media outlet SkiathosLife.gr promoted the fixture as an international sporting event aimed at strengthening relations between the two clubs and encouraging sporting tourism and international cooperation.

The match ended in a 1–1 draw, following a disciplined performance by Ħamrun Sporting. The fixture was also broadcast in Malta on TVM (Malta) Sport+ , providing the club with national television exposure during its first international sporting initiative.

Following the fixture, Greek media reported on the visit of the Maltese delegation and highlighted the international sporting relationship created between Ħamrun Sporting and Atletico Skiathos. The training camp provided an opportunity for representatives of both clubs to exchange ideas and discuss possible future cooperation and reciprocal sporting initiatives.

The international programme represented an important step in Ħamrun Sporting's development beyond domestic amateur football, providing its players and technical staff with experience in a different football environment while generating exposure for the club and its partners in both Malta and Greece.

The club intends to build upon this experience by developing further international sporting relationships, training opportunities and exchange programmes in future seasons.

=== Community Initiatives ===
Alongside its sporting ambitions, Ħamrun Sporting Football Club has community outreach and corporate social responsibility (CSR) projects.

These include co-hosting the Christian Degabriele Memorial Cup in aid of the Karl Vella Foundation; introducing performance analysis technologies such as automated match recording and wearable tracking devices; providing structured first aid training to players, coaches and volunteers; promoting the use of digital tools in sports management, infrastructure and training, including live-streaming and virtual reality applications; and organising campaigns with health professionals to raise awareness of postural health and injury prevention.

The club plans to develop further educational and health-related initiatives, expand its youth development pathways, and strengthen ties with local schools, cultural groups, and supporters.

== Kits ==
The club's kit colours are red and black and they have historical significance and represent a strong connection with the community in Ħamrun.

=== Kit suppliers and shirt sponsors ===
Period	Kit manufacturer	Shirt sponsor (chest)			Shirt sponsor (sleeve)		
Period	Kit manufacturer	Home Kit	Away Kit	Third Kit	Home Kit	Away Kit	Third Kit
2022–2023	Erima	Tetu Bar & Restaurant	-	-	Clentec Malta Ltd	-	-
2023–2024	Erima	Tetu Bar & Restaurant	Ta' Fonzu	-	Clentec Malta Ltd	Clentec Malta Ltd	-
2024–2025	Erima	Tetu Bar & Restaurant	Ta' Fonzu	-	Clentec Malta Ltd	Clentec Malta Ltd	-
2025–present	Erima	Ta' Fonzu	Tescoma	Ta' Fonzu	Clentec Malta Ltd	Vector Vision	Clentec Malta Ltd

== Emblem ==
The emblem features a modern, abstract design inspired by the Spartan Warrior, an iconic symbol of football in Ħamrun. This historic figure has been reimagined in a contemporary, minimalist style, bridging the club’s legacy with its forward-looking vision. The streamlined design resonates with the next generation, giving them a symbol they can connect with and make their own.

In 2025, following the club’s rebranding, the logo underwent a subtle evolution primarily reflected in the wording, while preserving the same iconic emblem that continues to represent strength, unity, and tradition within the community.

Ħamrun Sporting logo history
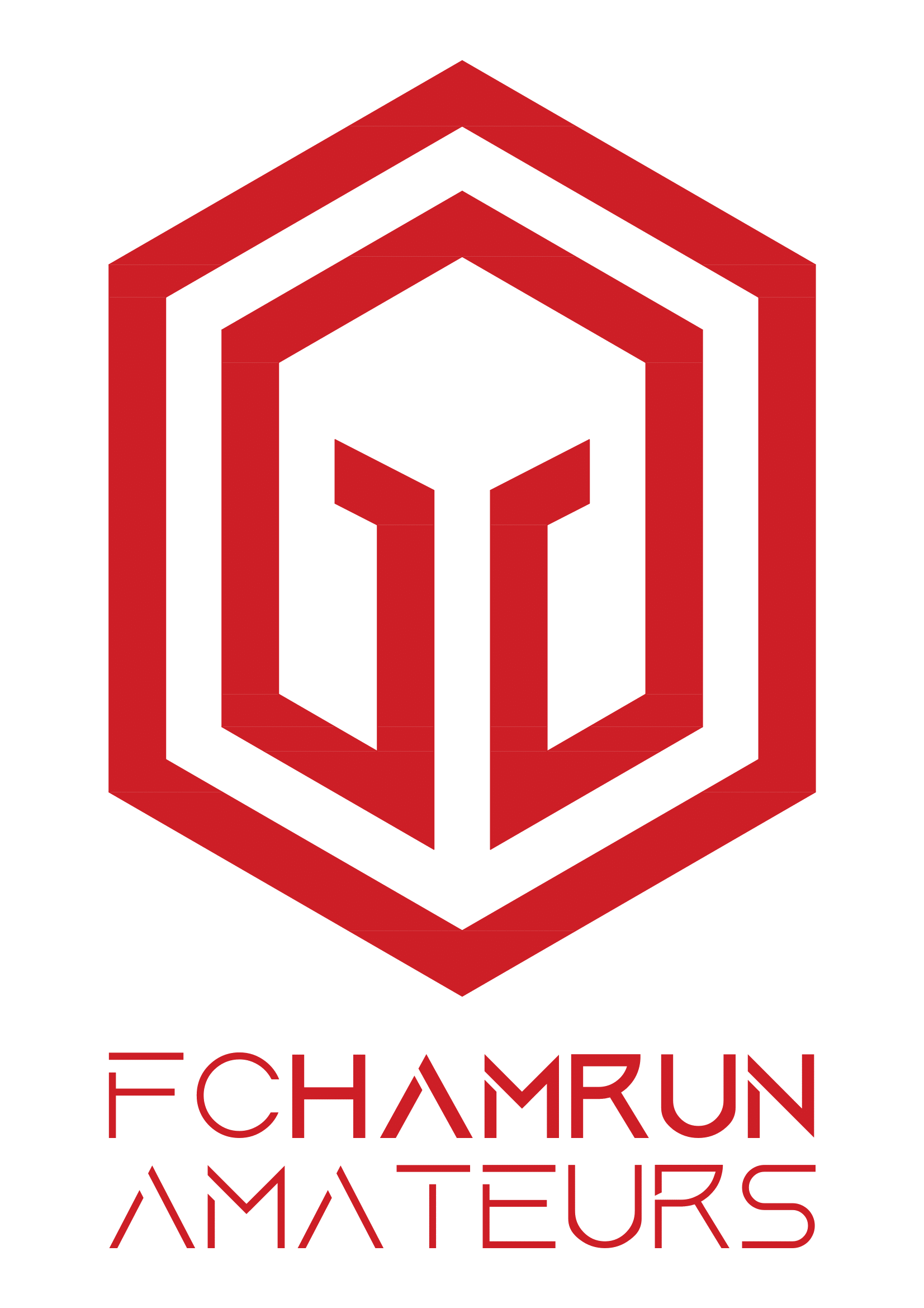
2022-2025

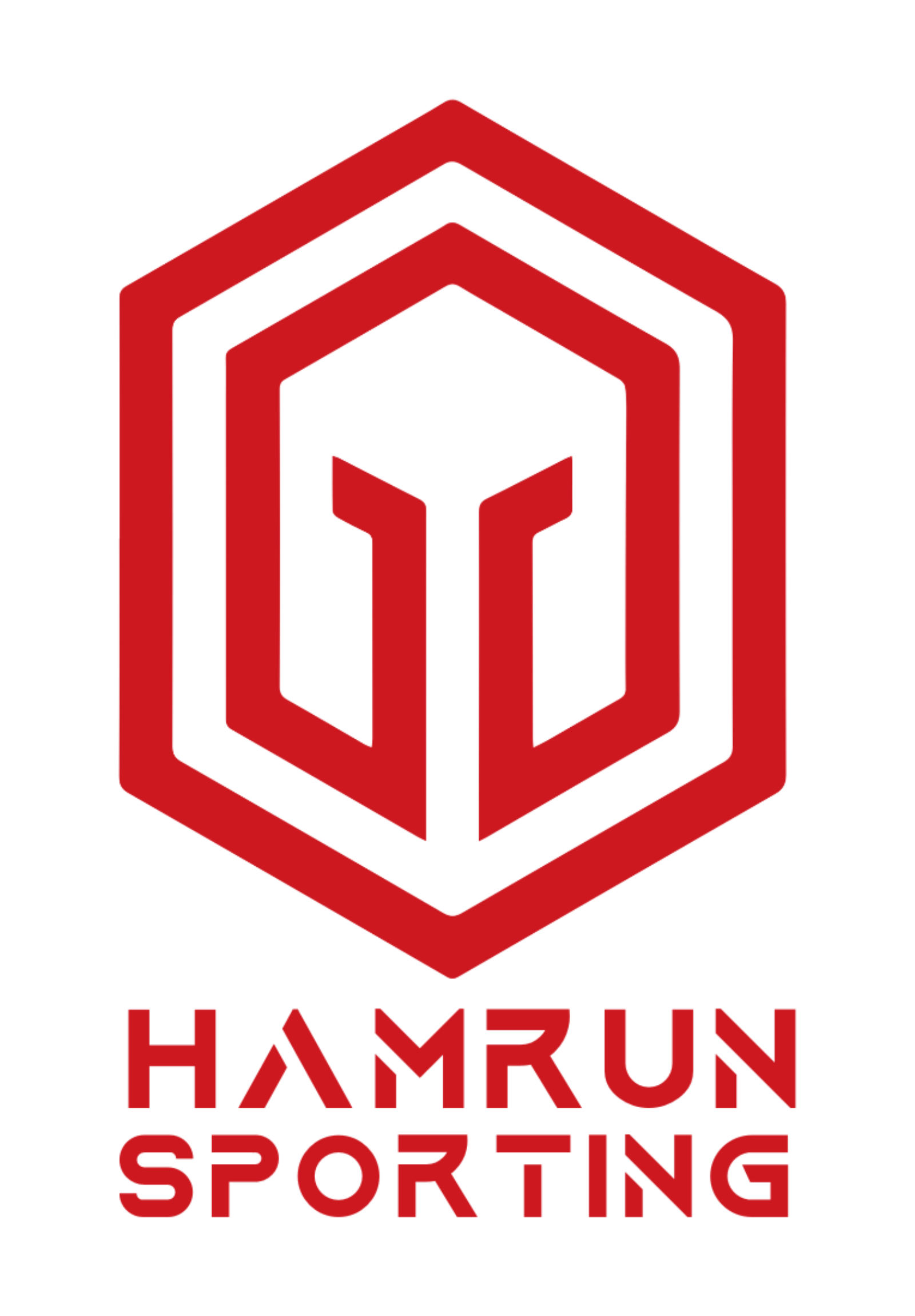
2025-Present

== Facilities ==
=== Ċentru għaż-Żgħażagħ ===
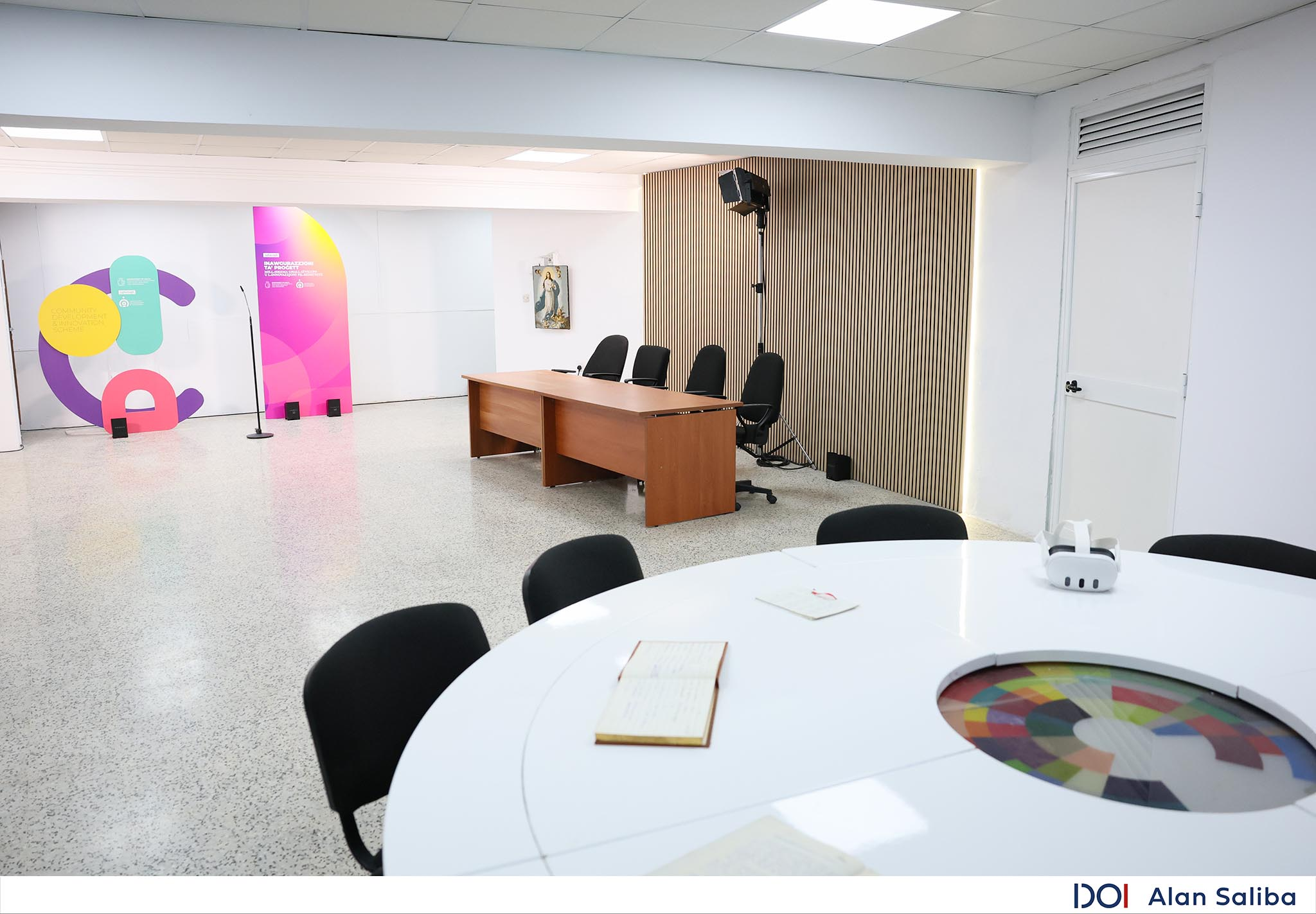
Ċentru għaż-Żgħażagħ Premises after the renovation

Ħamrun Sporting makes use of the Ċentru għaż-Żgħażagħ – Ħamrun, which serves as a central hub for youth development, education, and community-based activities associated with the club. The youth centre was officially inaugurated following an extensive refurbishment and investment project aimed at modernising the premises and enhancing services for young people in the locality.

The modernised centre provides indoor facilities that support a range of educational, social, and sporting initiatives. These include spaces for team meetings, tactical briefings, video analysis sessions, workshops, and youth engagement programmes. The investment transformed the centre into a multi-functional and inclusive environment designed to encourage participation, creativity, and personal development among young people.

In addition to sporting-related activities, the centre is also used for parental meetings, coaching courses, and community events, reinforcing Ħamrun Sporting’s role within the wider social fabric of the locality. The youth centre is intended to function as a safe and accessible space that promotes inclusion, lifelong learning, and active participation in sport and community life.

=== Training Facilities ===
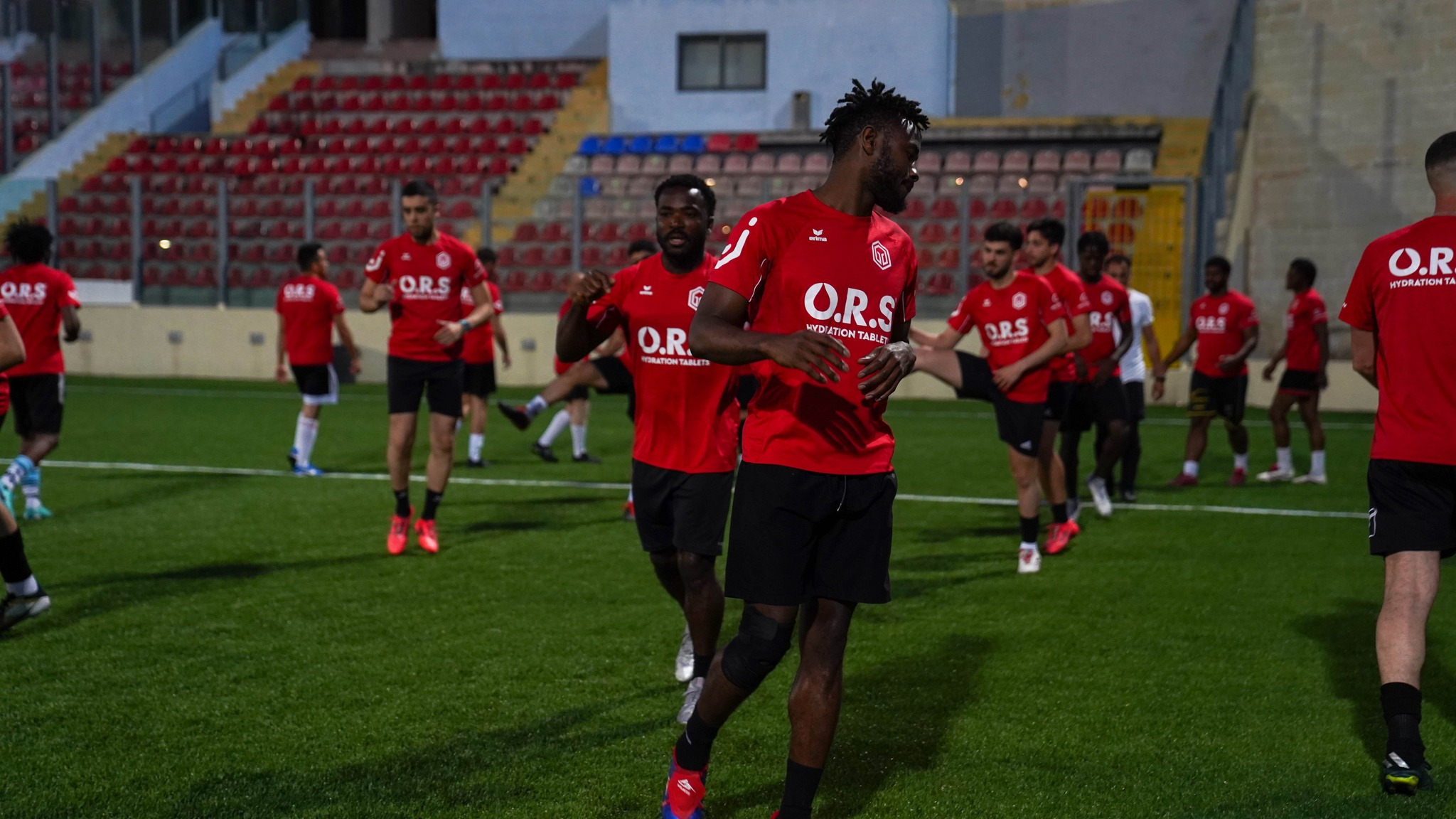
Training session held at Victor Tedesco Stadium

On the sporting side, Ħamrun Sporting conducts its training sessions at the Victor Tedesco Stadium, a football venue located in the heart of Ħamrun. Access to the stadium is made possible through a collaborative arrangement with Ħamrun Spartans, the town’s long-established top-flight club. This collaboration allows Ħamrun Sporting to utilise the stadium’s pitch and related facilities for training sessions and internal club activities, providing players with a professional training environment.

Due to regulations and scheduling requirements set by the Malta Amateur Football Association, the Victor Tedesco Stadium is not used for the club’s official competition matches, which are instead played at other designated grounds. Despite this, the stadium remains an important training base and a symbolic venue reflecting the club’s close connection to Ħamrun’s football heritage.

In addition, the club collaborates with local gyms and fitness centres to provide players with access to strength and conditioning facilities, rehabilitation equipment, and injury prevention services. These partnerships support structured physical development programmes tailored to players of different age groups and competitive levels, complementing the club’s on-field training activities.

== Statistics ==
=== Men's Non-League Football Competition ===
Season	League	Position	National Cup	Christmas Cup	Fair Play Cup	70th Anniversary Cup	Significant Events
2022/23	MAFA 3rd Division	5th	Round of 16	-	-	-	Won the fair play award and Qualified for the Twanny Agius Fair Play Cup
2023/24	MAFA 3rd Division	1st	Preliminary Round	-	Runner-up	-	Champions and Promoted to MAFA 2nd Division, Runner's Up in the Twanny Agius Fair Play Cup
2024/25	MAFA 2nd Division	6th	Round of 16	-	-	-	
2025/26	MAFA 2nd Division	4th	Semi Final	-	-	1st Round	Participated in the BOV MAFA 70th Anniversary Cup, Qualified for the Semi-final of the MAFA Knockout
2026/27	MAFA 2nd Division	TBD	TBD	TBD		-	TBD

== Honours ==
- MAFA 3rd Division
  - Champions (1): 2023 – 2024
- MAFA Fair Play Award
  - Winners (1): 2022 – 2023
- Christian Degabriele Memorial Cup
  - Winners (1): 2026

== Players ==
=== Current squad ===
Note: Flags indicate national team as defined under FIFA eligibility rules; some limited exceptions apply. Players may hold more than one non-FIFA nationality.

No.	Pos.	Nation	Player
—	GK	MLT	Roderick Camilleri
—	GK	MLT	Saimi Omar
—	GK	NED	Tom De Vries
—	DF	MLT	Dunstan Bonnici
—	DF	MLT	Jürgen Buhagiar
—	DF	MLT	Kurt Buhagiar
—	DF	MLT	Andriy Camilleri (captain)
—	DF	MLT	Owen Cassar
—	DF	MLT	Ian Cassar
—	DF	MLT	Mark Ellul
—	DF	MLT	Jeremy Gerada
—	DF	MLT	Jeremy Grixti
—	DF	MLT	Timothy Vella
—	DF	COL	Santiago Castillo
—	DF	COL	Daniel Suarez
—	DF	NGR	Sylvester Kingsley
—	DF	SWE	Alexander Petersson

No.	Pos.	Nation	Player
—	MF	MLT	Andre Galea
—	MF	MLT	Miguel Grima
—	MF	ARG	Gaston Lopez
—	MF	CMR	Daniel Aghen
—	MF	CMR	Francky Emane
—	MF	COL	Christian Osorio
—	MF	COL	Neider Vasqeuz
—	MF	ITA	Abraham Boham
—	MF	IND	Rishan Muhammed
—	FW	MLT	Owen Agius
—	FW	MLT	Martin Busuttil
—	FW	MLT	Kyle Formosa
—	FW	MLT	Josef Zammit (vice-captain)
—	FW	GHA	Abdul Sadick
—	FW	IRL	Denis Dluha
—	FW	ITA	Aurelio Vallone
—	FW	MAR	Oussama Boutayeb

=== Captain ===
Name	Years
(Malta) Larkin Alan Portelli (DF)	2022 – 2024
(Malta) Andriy Camilleri (DF)	2024 – Present

=== Notable former players ===
Name	Years
(Argentina) Santiago Salicas (GK)	2022 – 2026

== Club Structure ==
=== Executive Board ===
Member	Role
(Malta) Jürgen Buhagiar	Chairperson
(Malta) Kurt Buhagiar	Deputy Chairperson
(Malta) Stephen Buhagiar	Board Member for Sport

=== Club Secretariat ===
Member	Role
(Malta) Dunstan Bonnici	General Secretary
(Malta) Andriy Camilleri	Delegate 1
(Malta) Josef Zammit	Delegate 2
(Malta) Larkin Portelli	Delegate 3

=== Sporting Operations ===
Technical Staff
(Malta) Luca Zammit	Head Coach
(Malta) Franco Davies	Physio
