= Architecture of Malta =

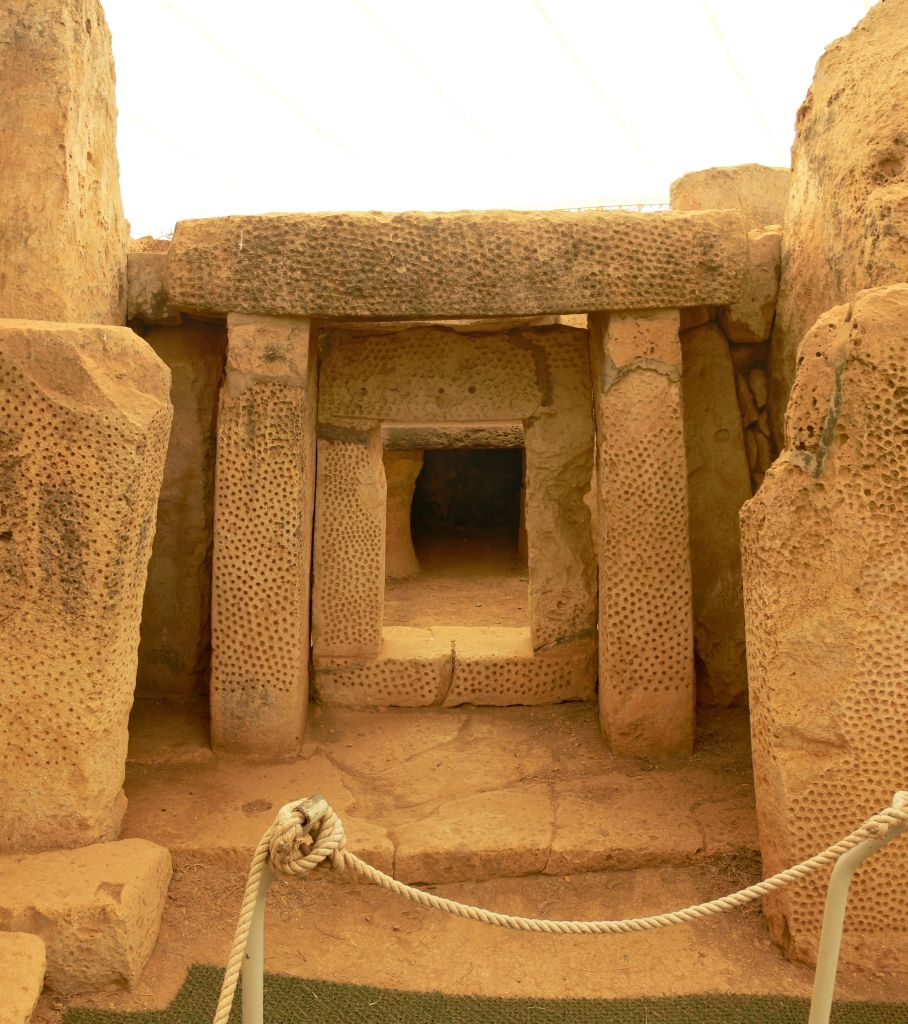
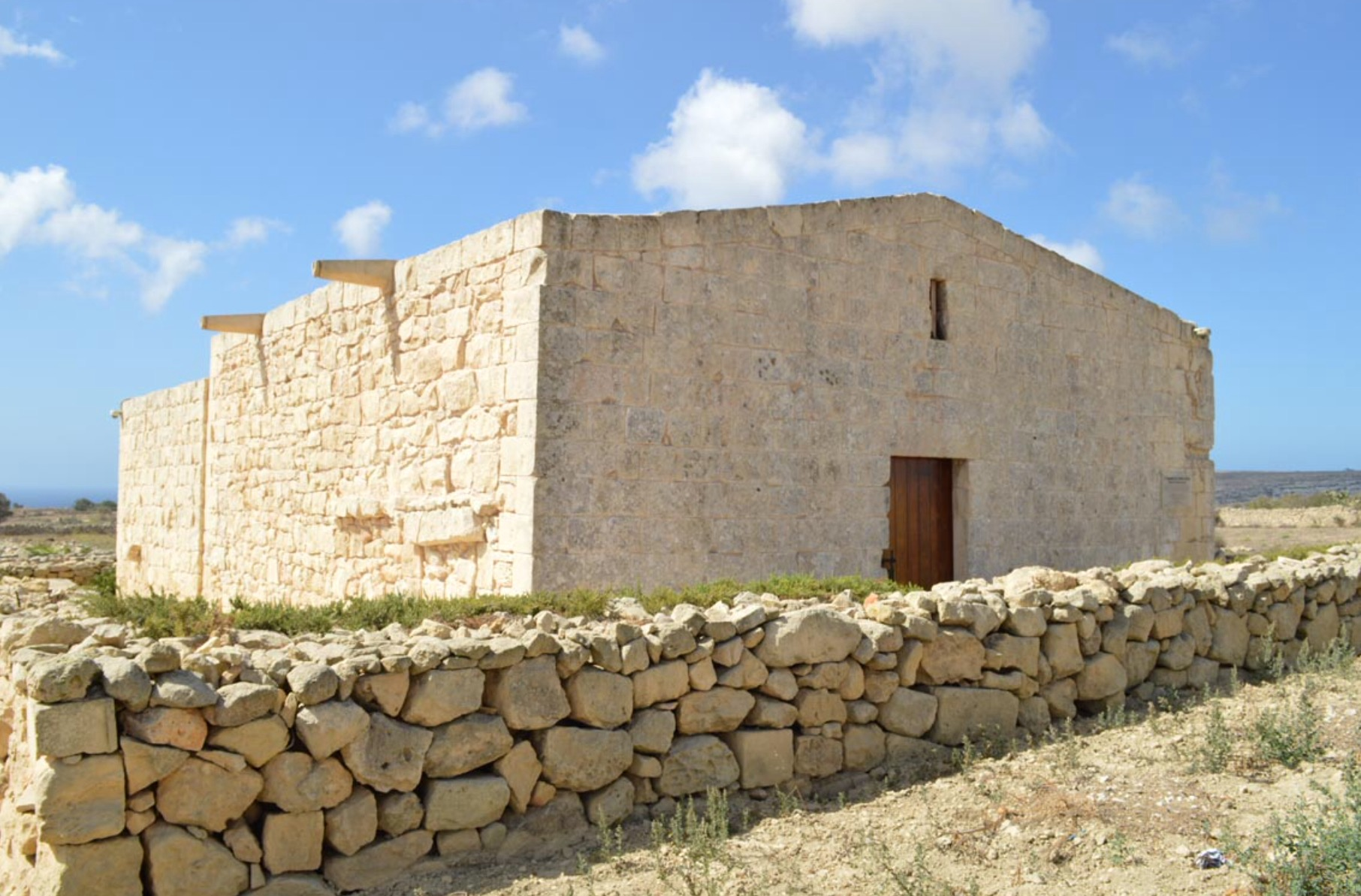
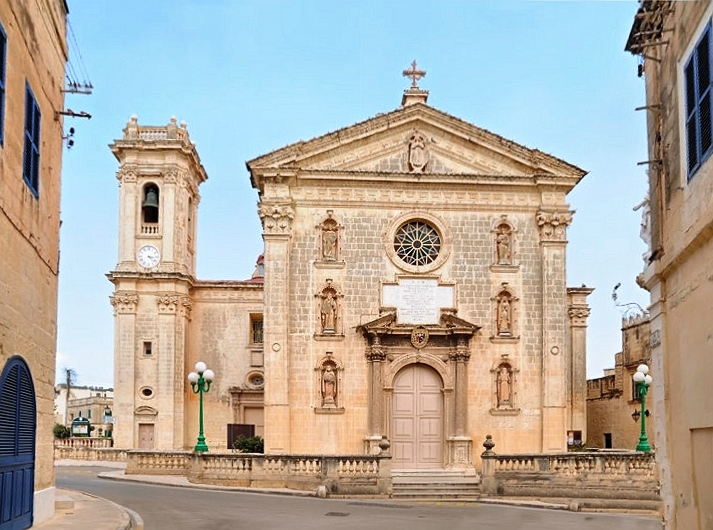
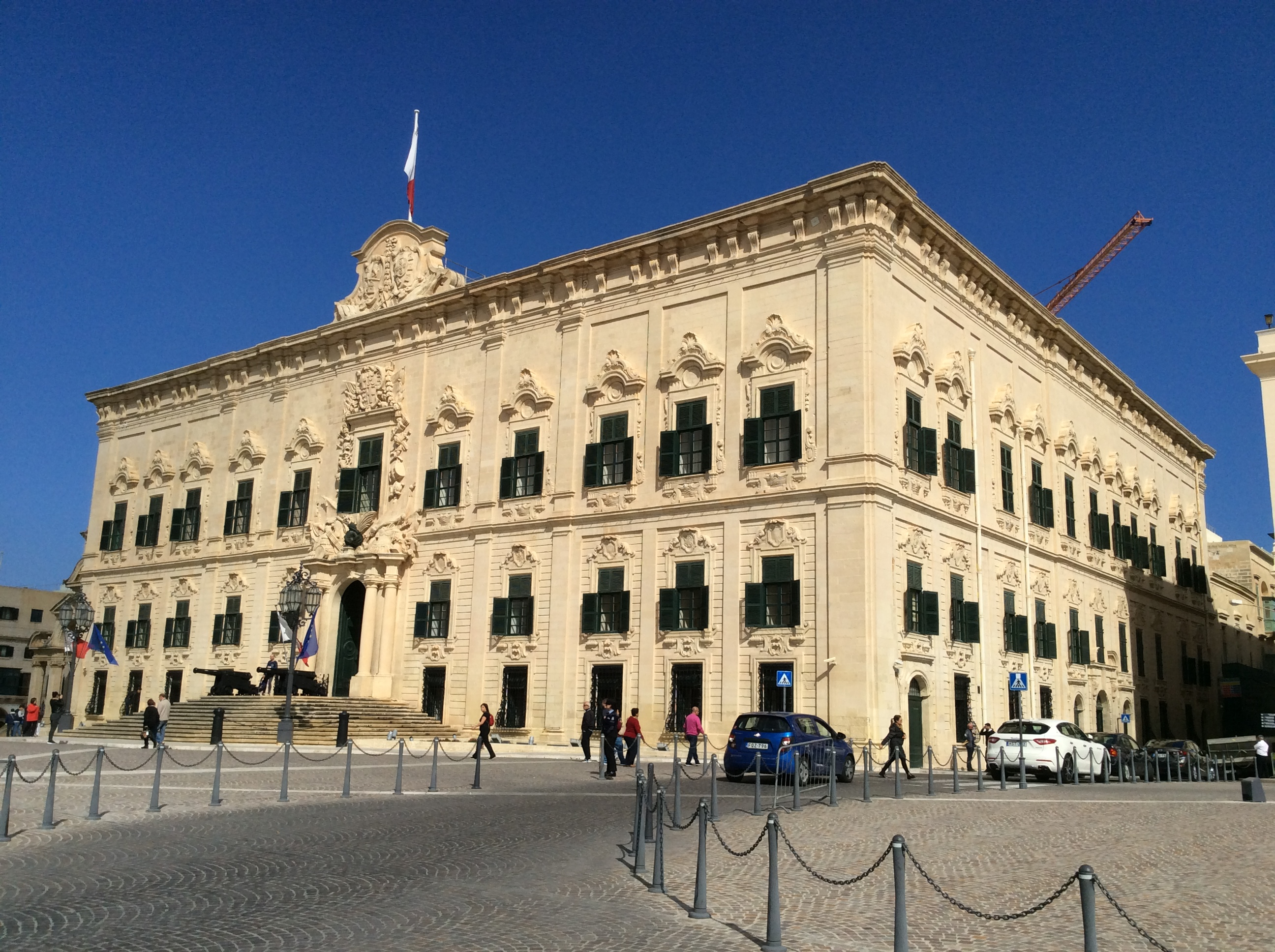
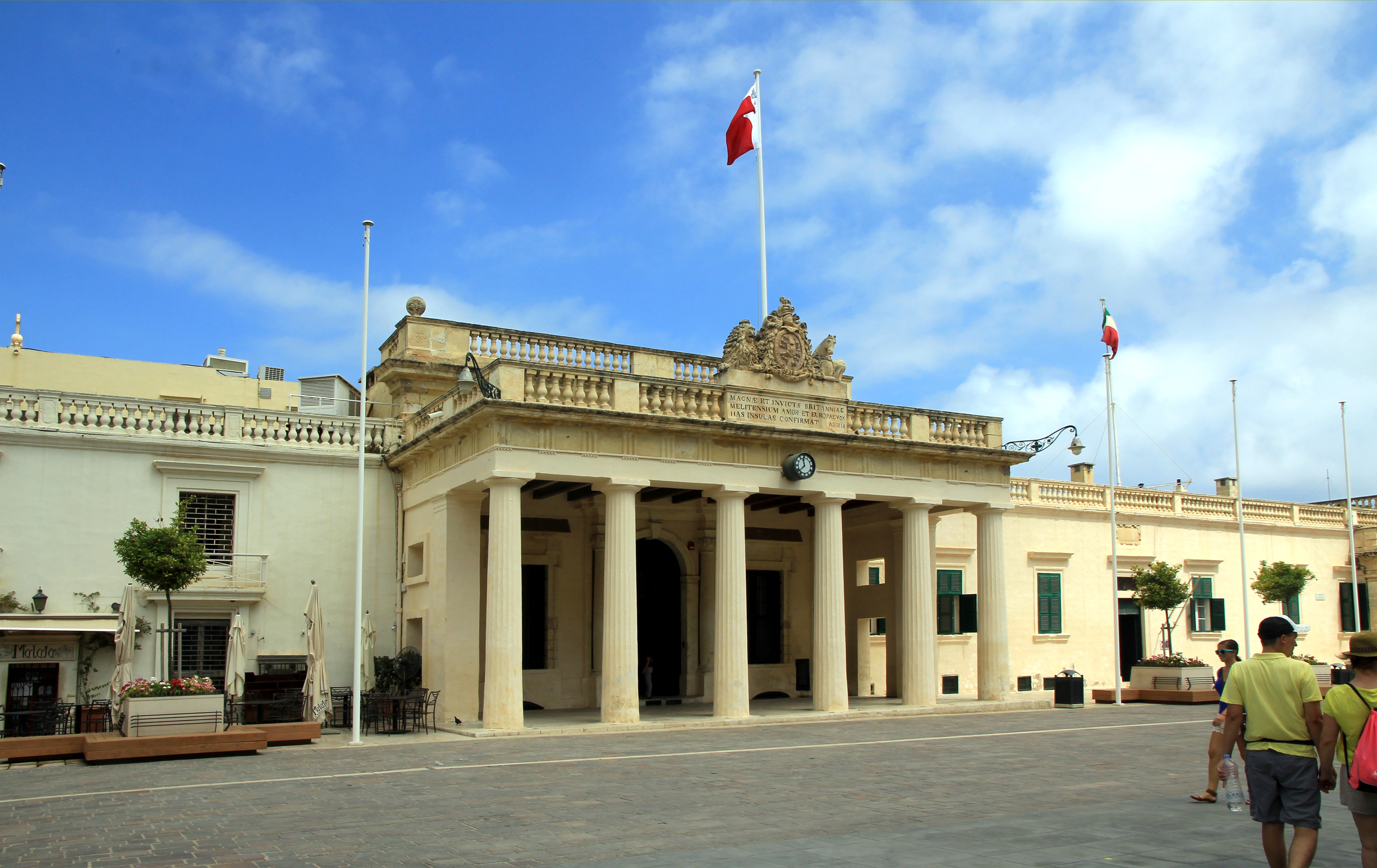
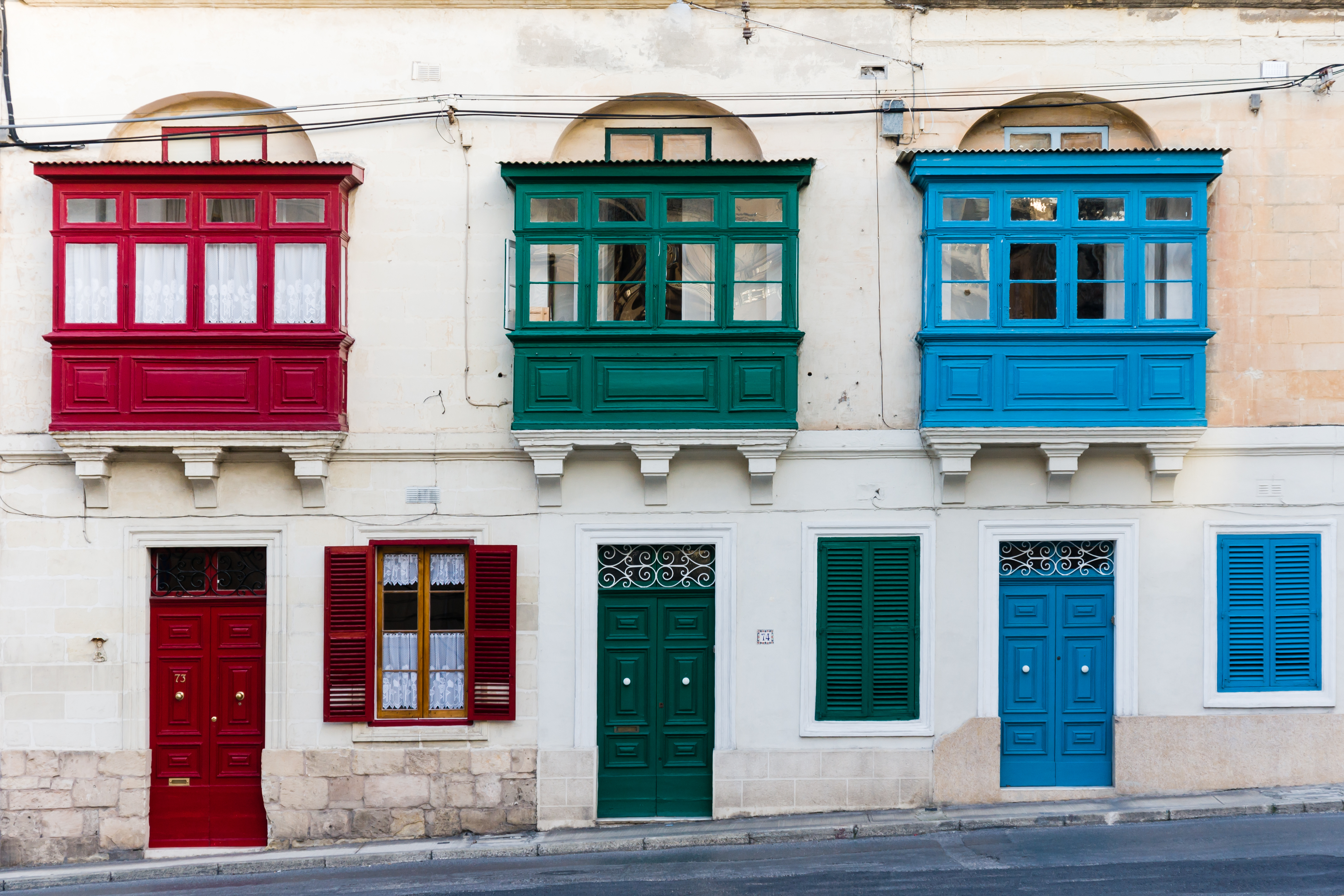
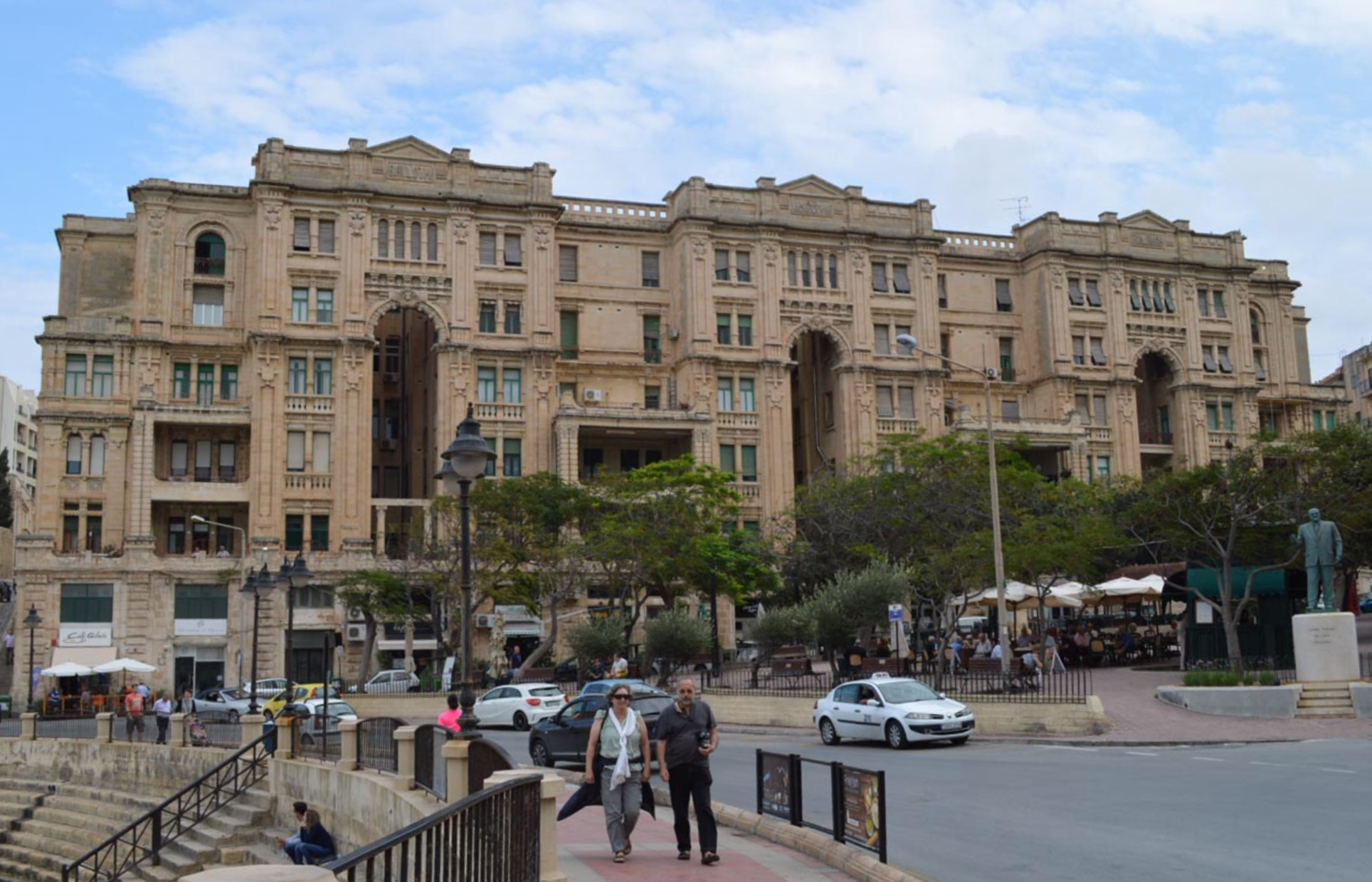
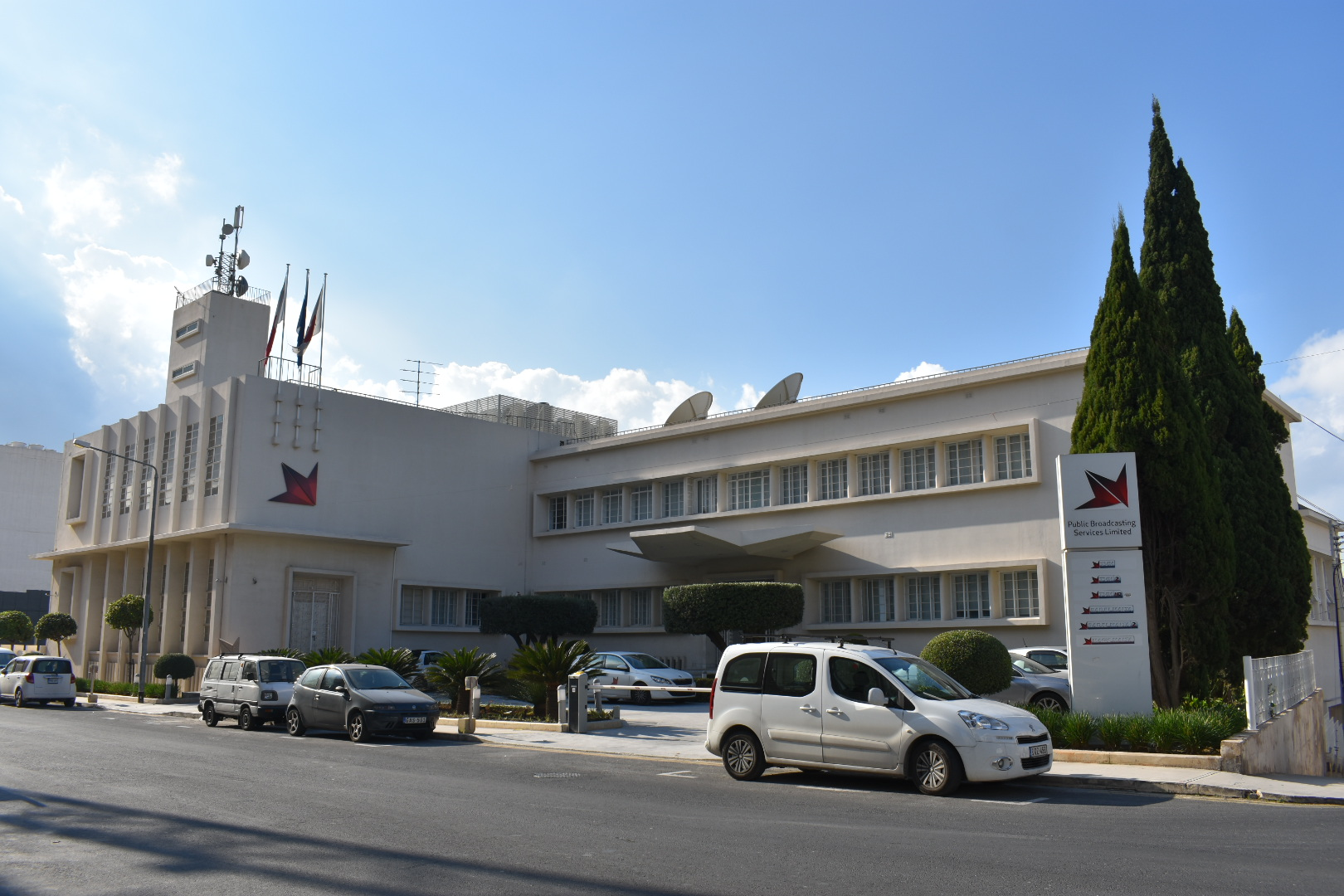
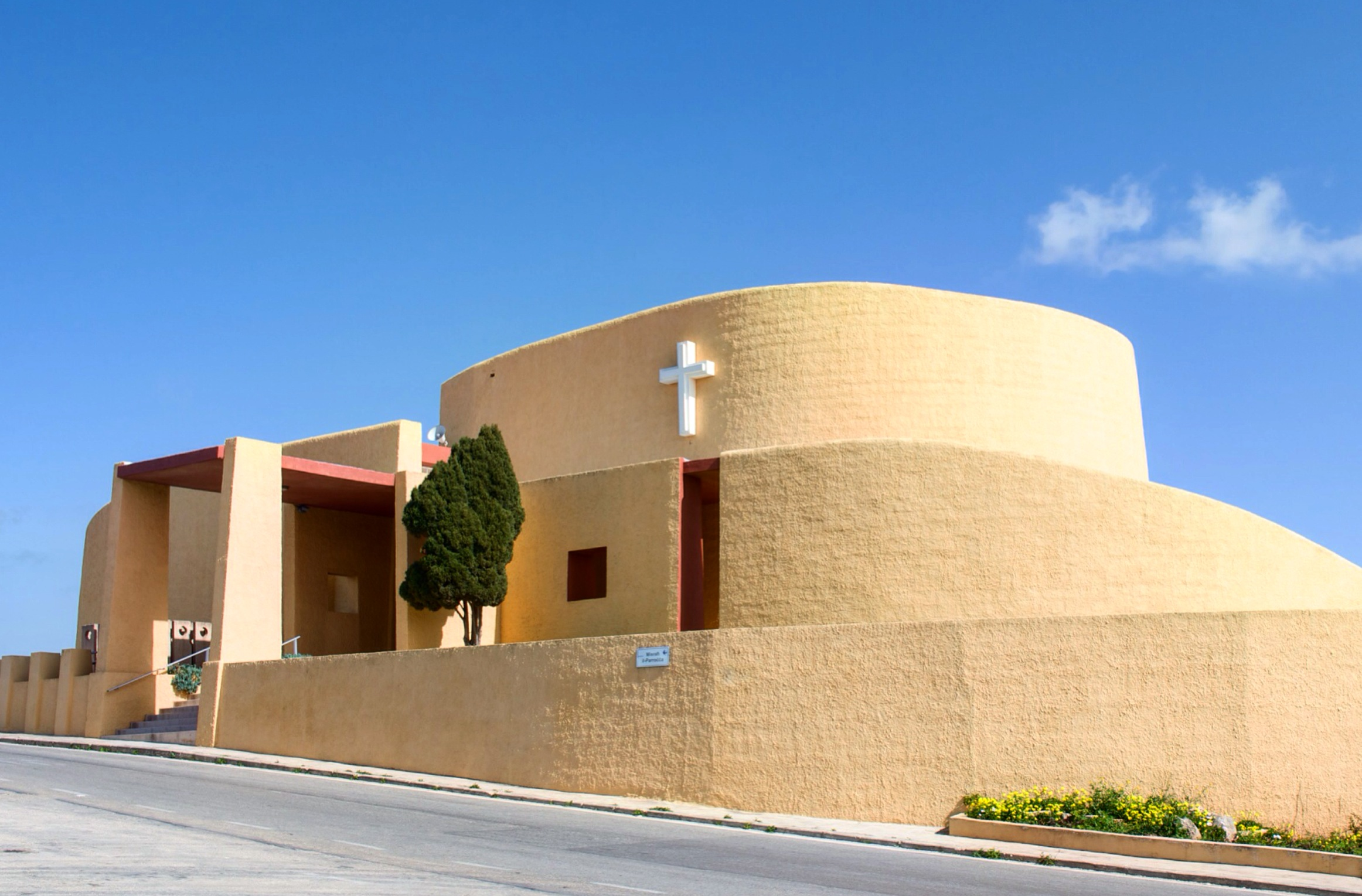
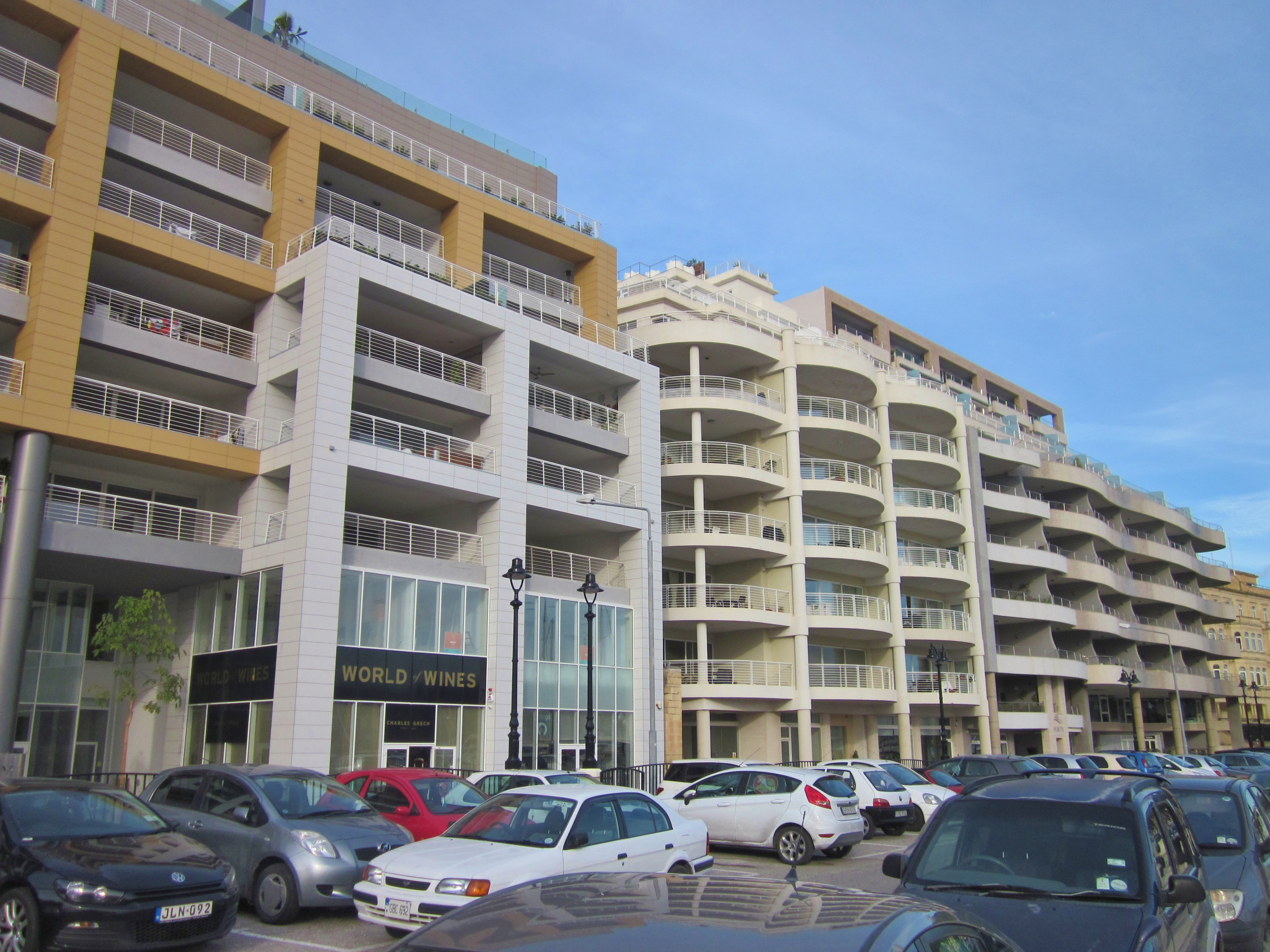
Examples of Maltese architecture from different periods: the prehistoric Mnajdra Temples, the medieval Santa Cecilia Chapel, the Renaissance parish church of Attard, the Baroque Auberge de Castille, the neoclassical Main Guard, traditional townhouses in Sliema, the Art Nouveau Balluta Buildings, the modernist Rediffusion House, the critical regionalist Manikata church and contemporary apartments in Ta' Xbiex

Maltese architecture has its origins in prehistory, and some of the oldest free-standing structures on Earth – a series of megalithic temples – can be found on Malta. The islands were colonized by the Phoenicians and later the Romans, who established the cities of Melite and Gaulos. Although these were substantial settlements and are known to have had numerous temples, churches and palaces, few remains have survived apart from some architectural fragments.

After the fall of the Western Roman Empire, Malta became part of the Byzantine Empire, before falling to the Arabs in 870. Virtually no examples of Byzantine or Arab architecture have survived, although the Arabs left a significant influence on Maltese vernacular architecture which remained popular in subsequent centuries. Malta became part of the County and later the Kingdom of Sicily in 1091, and Norman architecture and other European styles were introduced to the island. Relatively few examples of medieval architecture have survived, including a few buildings in Mdina and the Cittadella, as well as several chapels in the Maltese countryside.

Maltese architecture flourished while the islands were under the rule of the Order of St. John from 1530 to 1798. The Hospitallers introduced Renaissance architecture to Malta in the mid-16th century, with the Baroque style becoming popular about a century later. The two and a half centuries of Hospitaller rule saw the establishment of new settlements (most notably the capital Valletta) and the construction of many churches, palaces and public buildings. The Order also built bastioned fortifications around the main cities, apart from a series of coastal and inland defences.

After Malta became part of the British Empire in 1800, Neoclassical and Neo-Gothic architecture were introduced, and they were the predominant styles of the 19th century. Several styles left an influence on Maltese architecture in the first half of the 20th century, including Art Nouveau, Art Deco, Italian futurism, rationalism and modernism. Malta experienced a building boom after World War II, which increased after independence in 1964. The modernist style remained popular, but new styles such as critical regionalism were also introduced.

== Prehistoric architecture ==
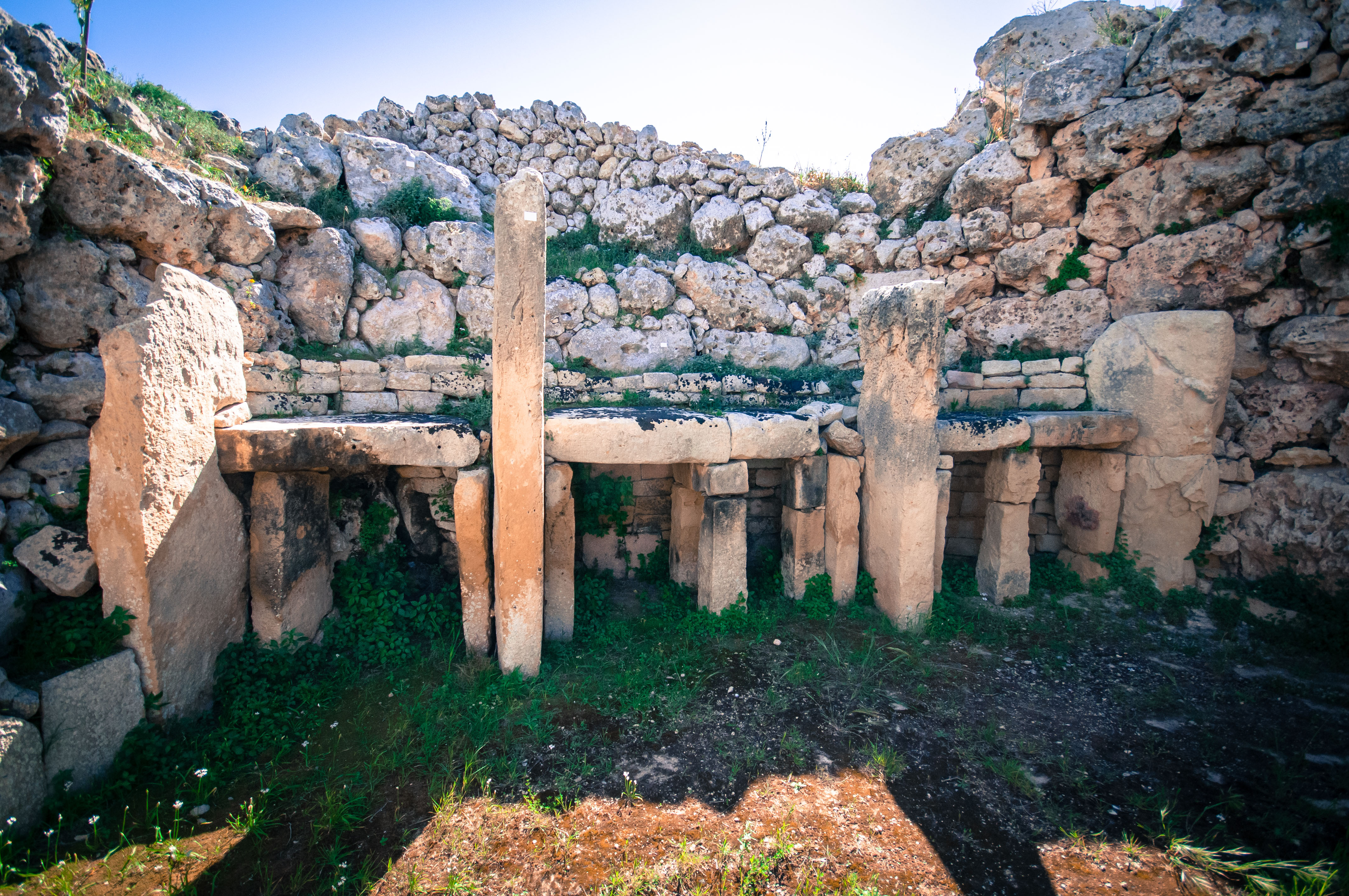
Ġgantija

The Ġgantija temples (two sites) were listed as a UNESCO World Heritage Site in 1980. In 1992, the UNESCO Committee further extended the existing listing to include five other megalithic temple sites. These are Ħaġar Qim (in Qrendi), Mnajdra (in Qrendi), Ta' Ħaġrat Temples (in Mġarr), Skorba Temples (in Żebbiegħ) and Tarxien Temples (in Tarxien). Nowadays, the sites are managed by Heritage Malta, while ownership of the surrounding lands varies from site to site. Apart from these, there are other megalithic temples in Malta which are not included in the UNESCO World Heritage list.

== Roman architecture ==
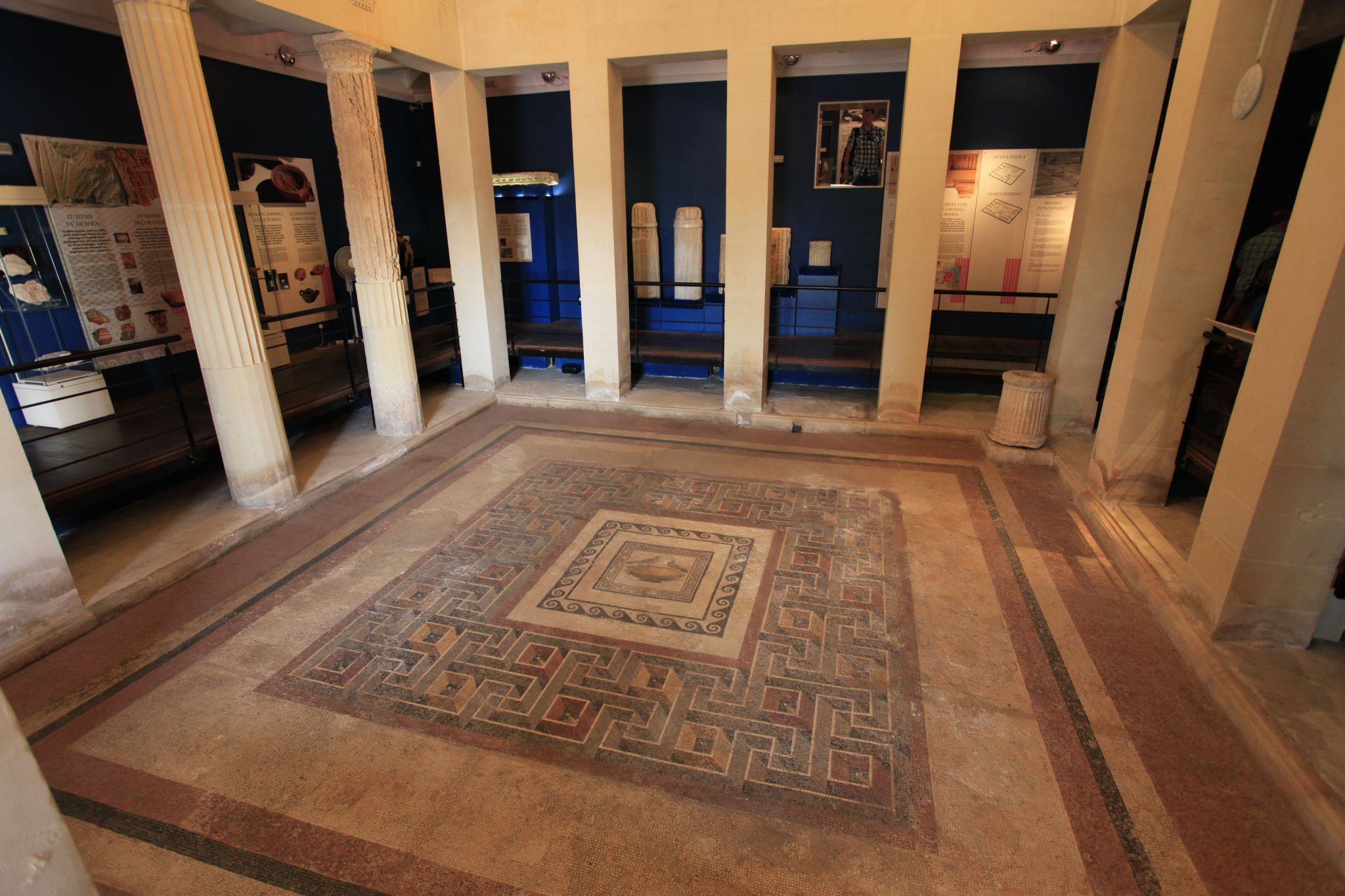
The mosaic of the peristyle of Rabat's Domvs Romana

The Domvs Romana (Latin for "Roman House"), is a ruined Roman-era house located on the boundary between Mdina and Rabat, Malta. It was built in the 1st century BC as an aristocratic town house (domus) within the Roman city of Melite.

== Arab architecture ==
The Muxrabija resembled a small Maltese balcony. This is very rare in Malta today, but they were carved out of stone or by wood. This was inspired from the Arabic Mashrabiya.

== Medieval architecture ==
- Annunciation Chapel, Victoria
- Chapel of San Mikiel Is-Sanċir
- Chapel of St Basil, Mqabba
- Chapel of the Annunciation, Żurrieq
- Cittadella (Gozo)
- Our Saviour's Chapel, Żejtun
- Palazzo Falson
- St Catherine's Old Church, Żejtun
- St Matthew's Chapel, Qrendi
- Santa Cecilia Chapel
- St Bartholomew's Chapel, Rabat
- St Mary Magdalene Chapel, Dingli
- St Mary's Chapel, Bir Miftuħ
- Tal-Virtù Church
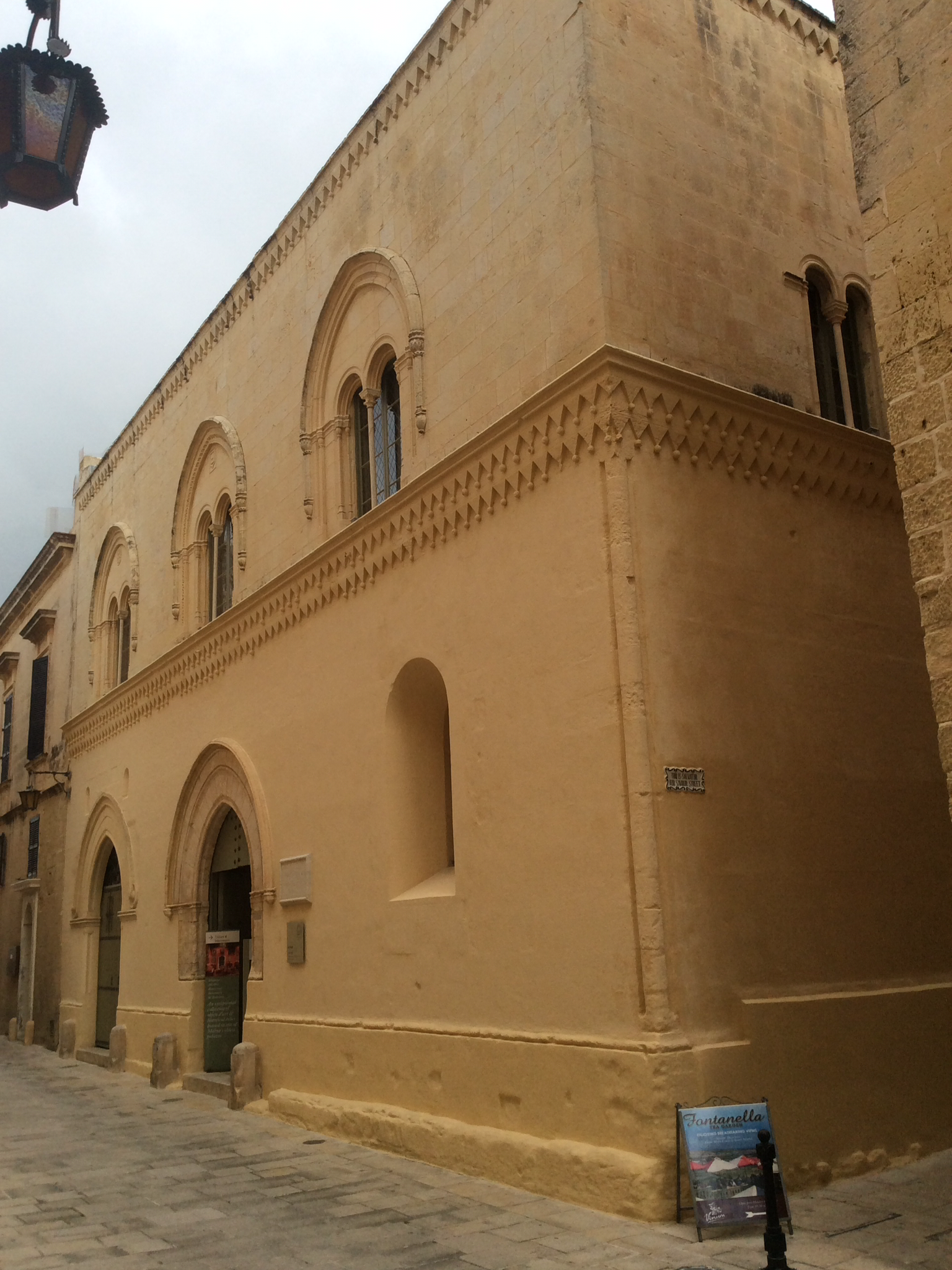
Palazzo Falson (1495)

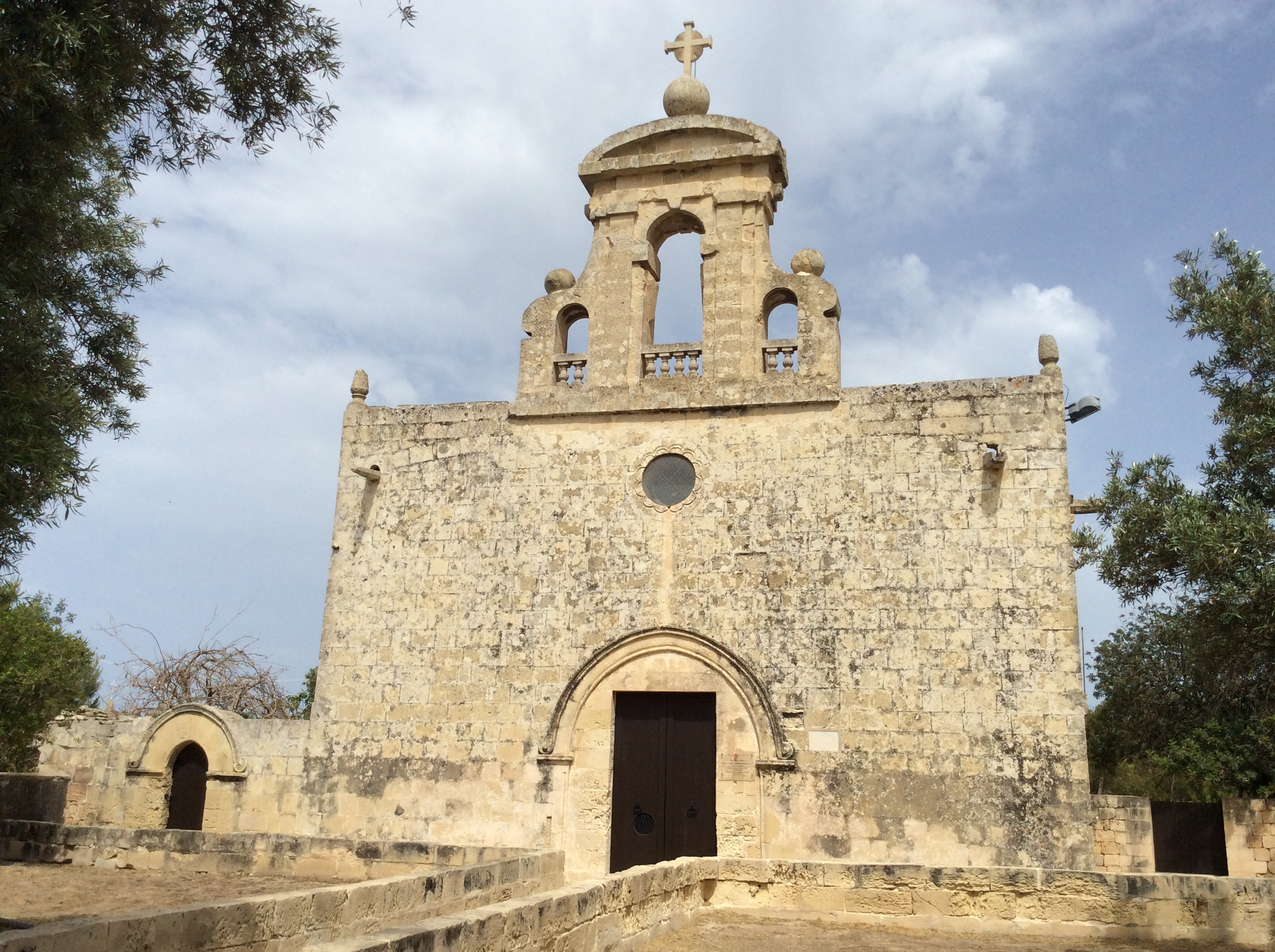
St Mary's Chapel, Bir Miftuħ

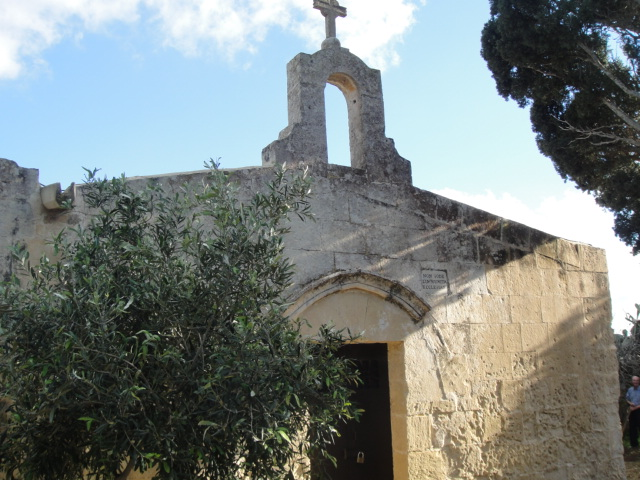
Chapel of the Annunciation, Żurrieq (Kappella tal-Lunzjata)

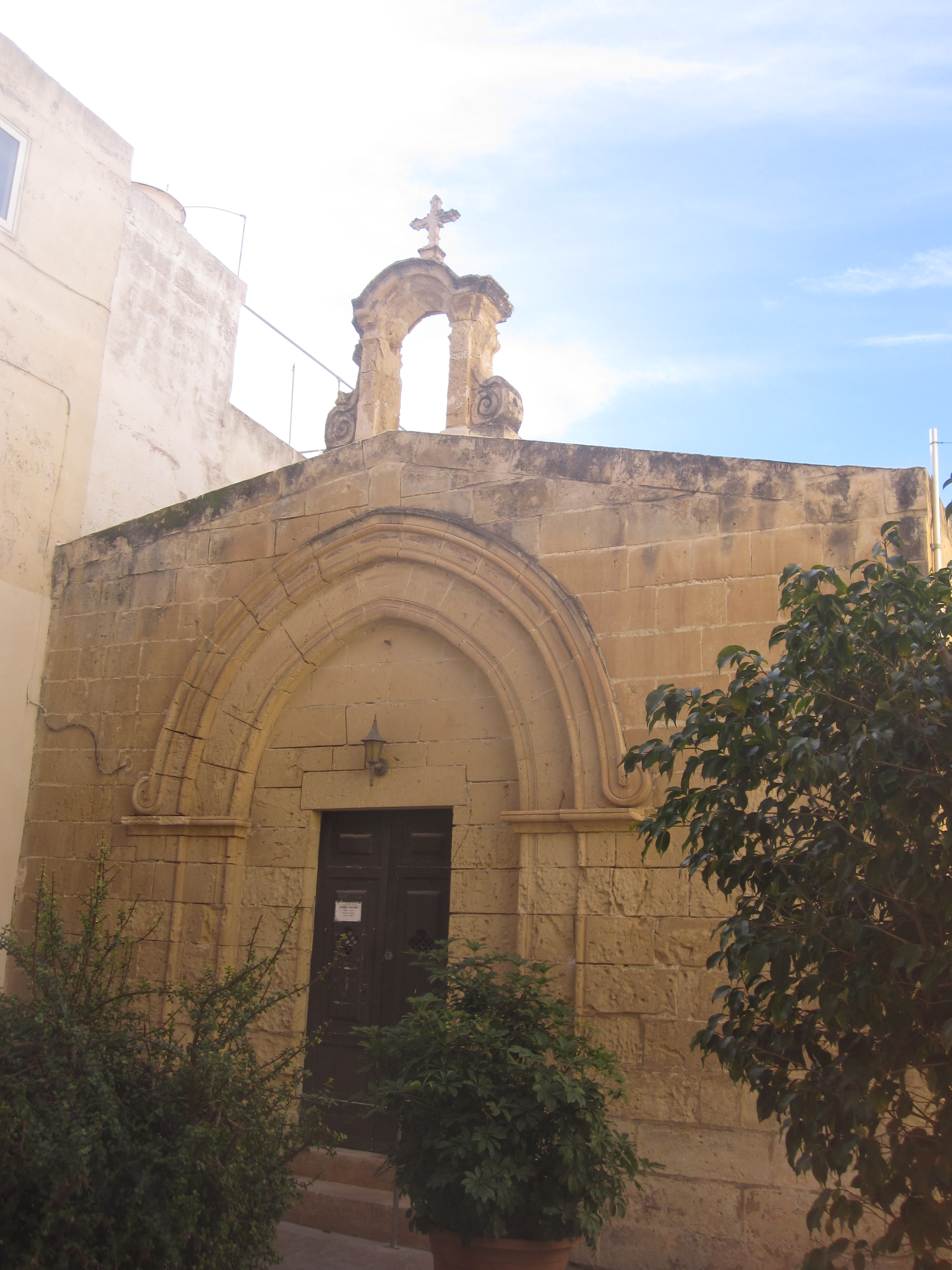
St Bartholomew's Chapel, Rabat

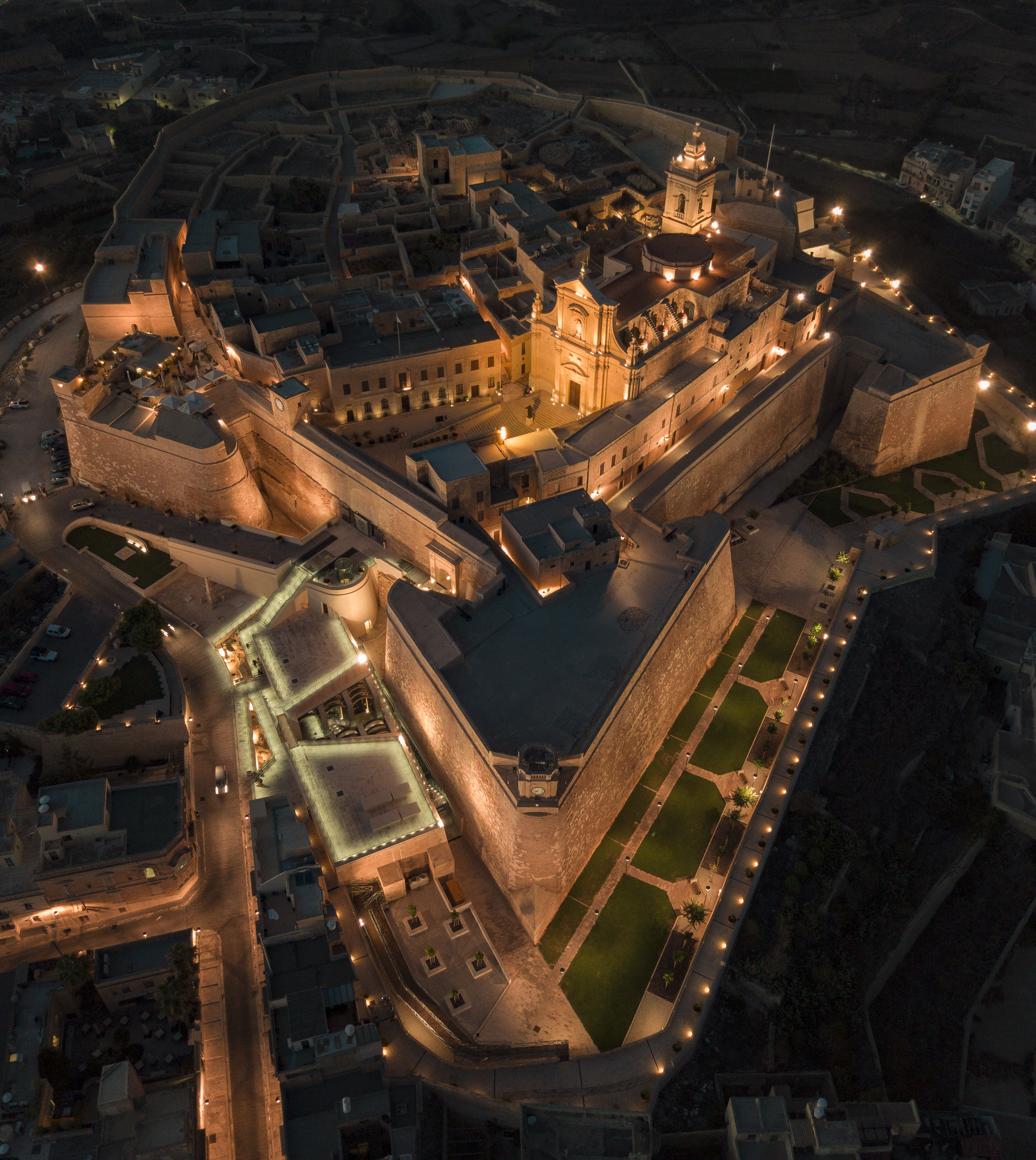
Aerial view at night of the Cittadella (Gozo) in 2017, showing the Hospitaller-era bastions

== Maltese Baroque architecture ==
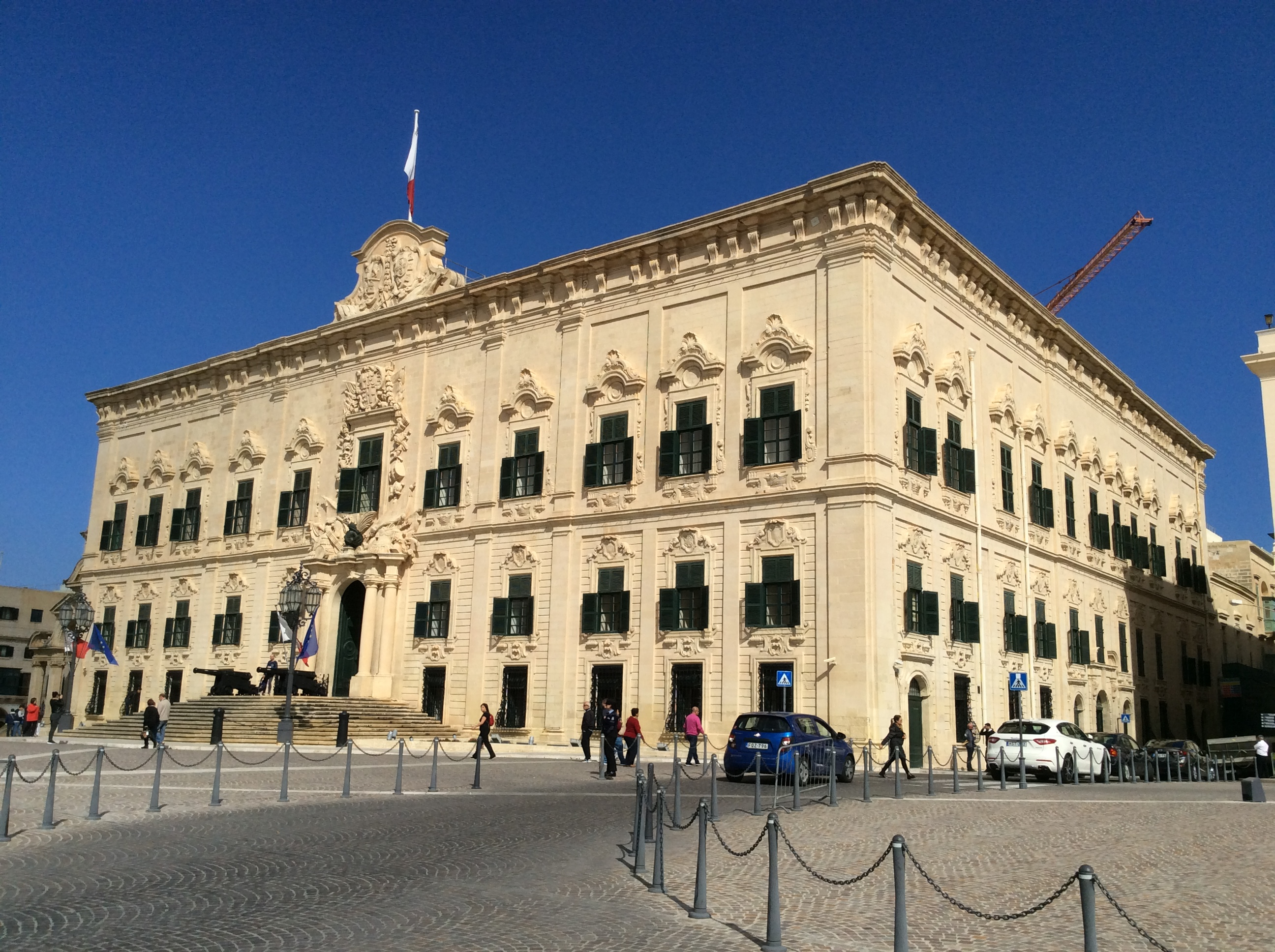
Auberge de Castille, designed by Andrea Belli in 1741–45

The Maltese Baroque is the form of Baroque architecture that developed in Malta during the 17th and 18th centuries, when the islands were under the rule of the Order of St. John. The Baroque style was introduced in Malta in the early 17th century, possibly by the Bolognese engineer Bontadino de Bontadini during the construction of the Wignacourt Aqueduct. The style became popular in the mid to late 17th century, and it reached its peak during the 18th century, when monumental Baroque structures such as Auberge de Castille were constructed.

The Baroque style began to be replaced by neoclassical architecture and other styles in the early 19th century, when Malta was under British rule. Despite this, Baroque elements continued to influence traditional Maltese architecture. Many churches continued to the built in the Baroque style throughout the 19th and 20th centuries, and to a lesser extent in the 21st century.

- Admiralty House (Valletta)
- Palazzo Nasciaro
- Corte Capitanale, Mdina (French Baroque)
- Vilhena Palace, Mdina (French Baroque)
- Banca Giuratale (Mdina)

== 19th century architecture ==
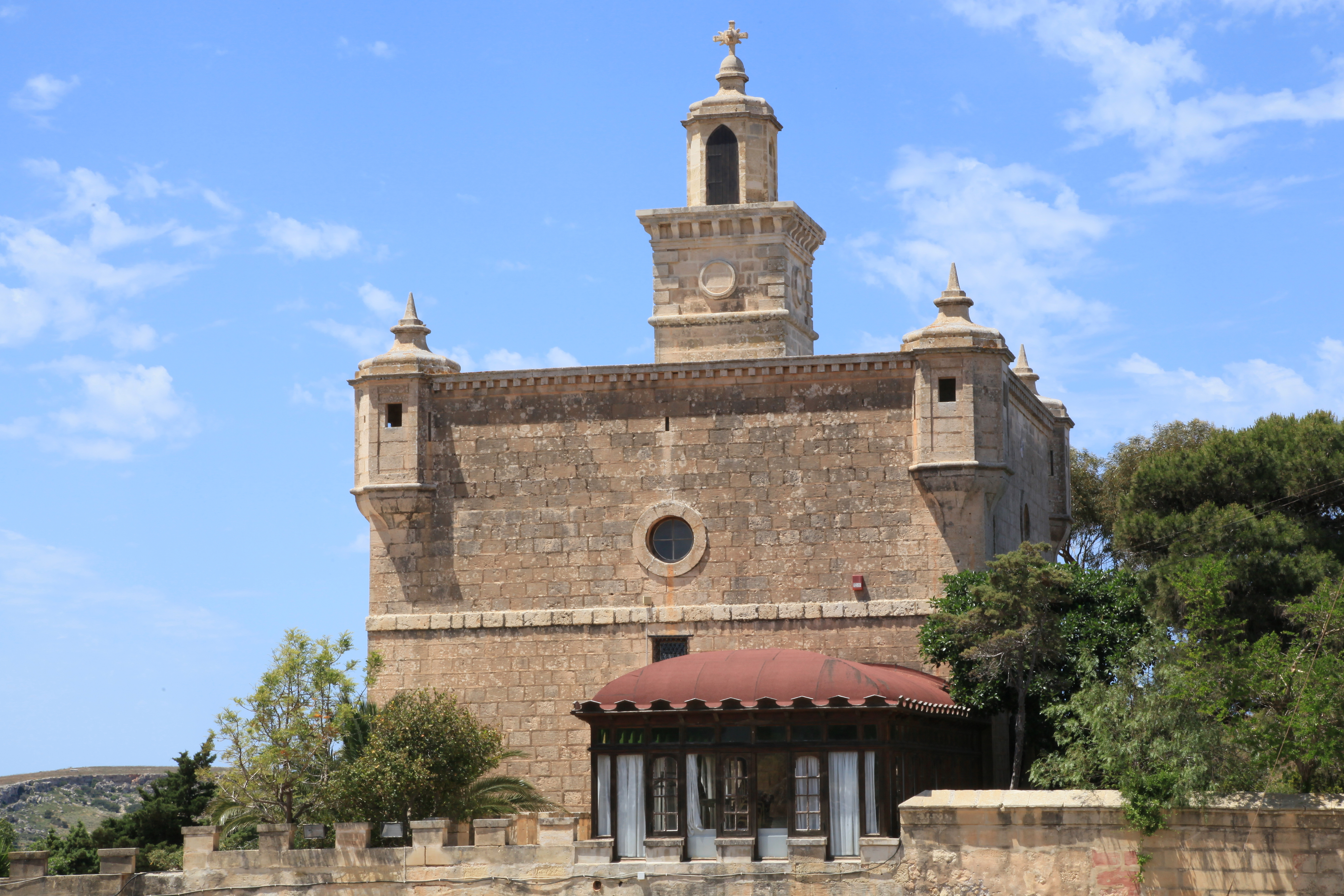
Castello Zammitello in Mgarr

=== Victorian architecture ===
- Is-Suq tal-Belt
- Zammitello Palace
- Valletta's Kingsgate, 1853

=== Neoclassical architecture ===
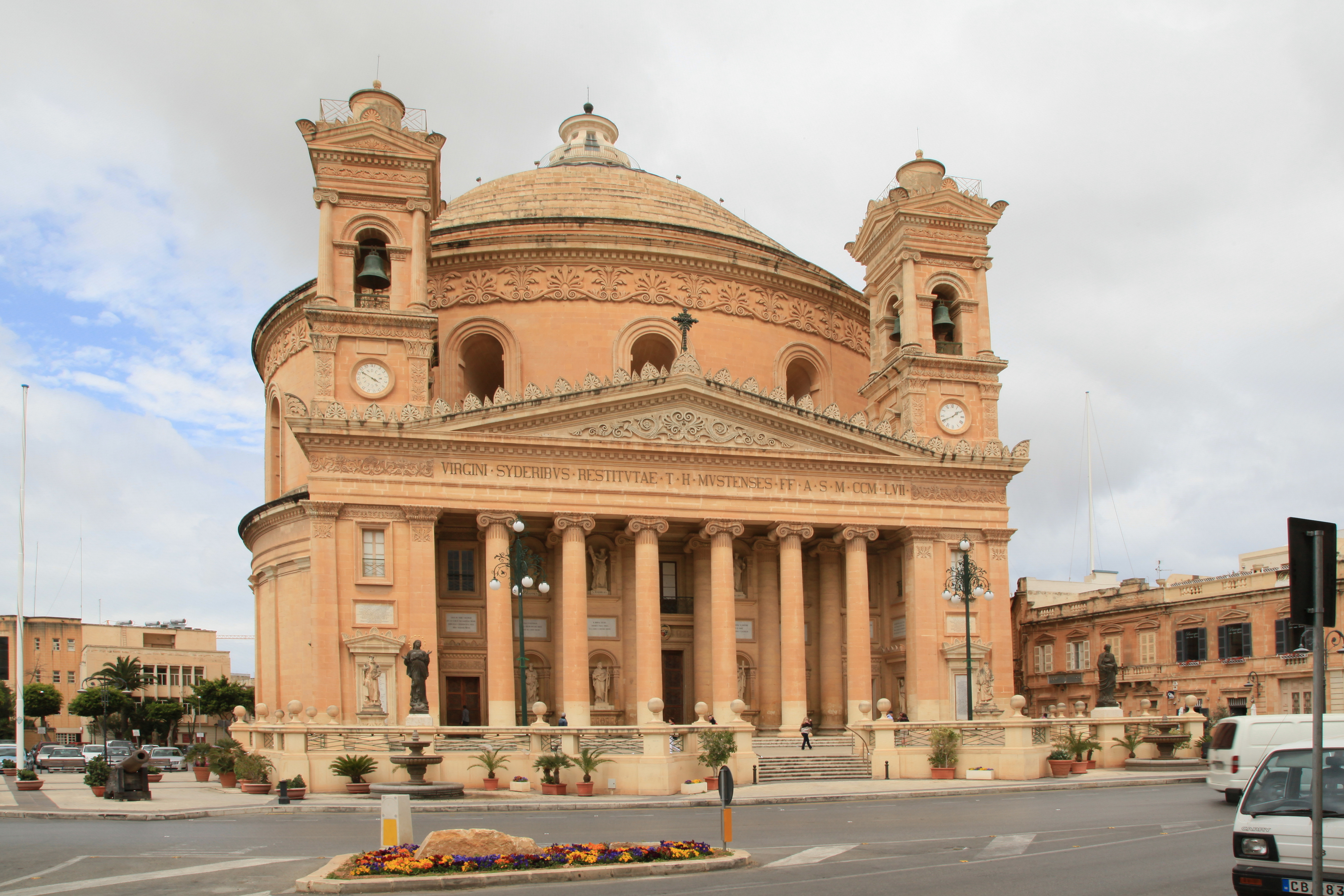
The Rotunda of Mosta, which was built between 1833 and 1860

Neoclassical architecture was introduced in Malta in the late 18th century, during the final years of Hospitaller rule. Early examples include the Bibliotheca (1786), the De Rohan Arch (1798) and the Hompesch Gate (1801). However, neoclassical architecture only became popular in Malta following the establishment of British rule in the early 19th century. In 1814, a neoclassical portico decorated with the British coat of arms was added to the Main Guard building so as to serve as a symbol of British Malta. Other 19th century neoclassical buildings include the Monument to Sir Alexander Ball (1810), RNH Bighi (1832), St Paul's Pro-Cathedral (1844), the Rotunda of Mosta (1860) and the now-destroyed Royal Opera House (1866).

Neoclassicism gave way to other architectural styles by the late 19th century. Few buildings were built in the neoclassical style during the 20th century, such as the Domvs Romana museum (1922), and the Courts of Justice building in Valletta (1965–71).

- La Borsa

=== Romanesque Revival architecture ===
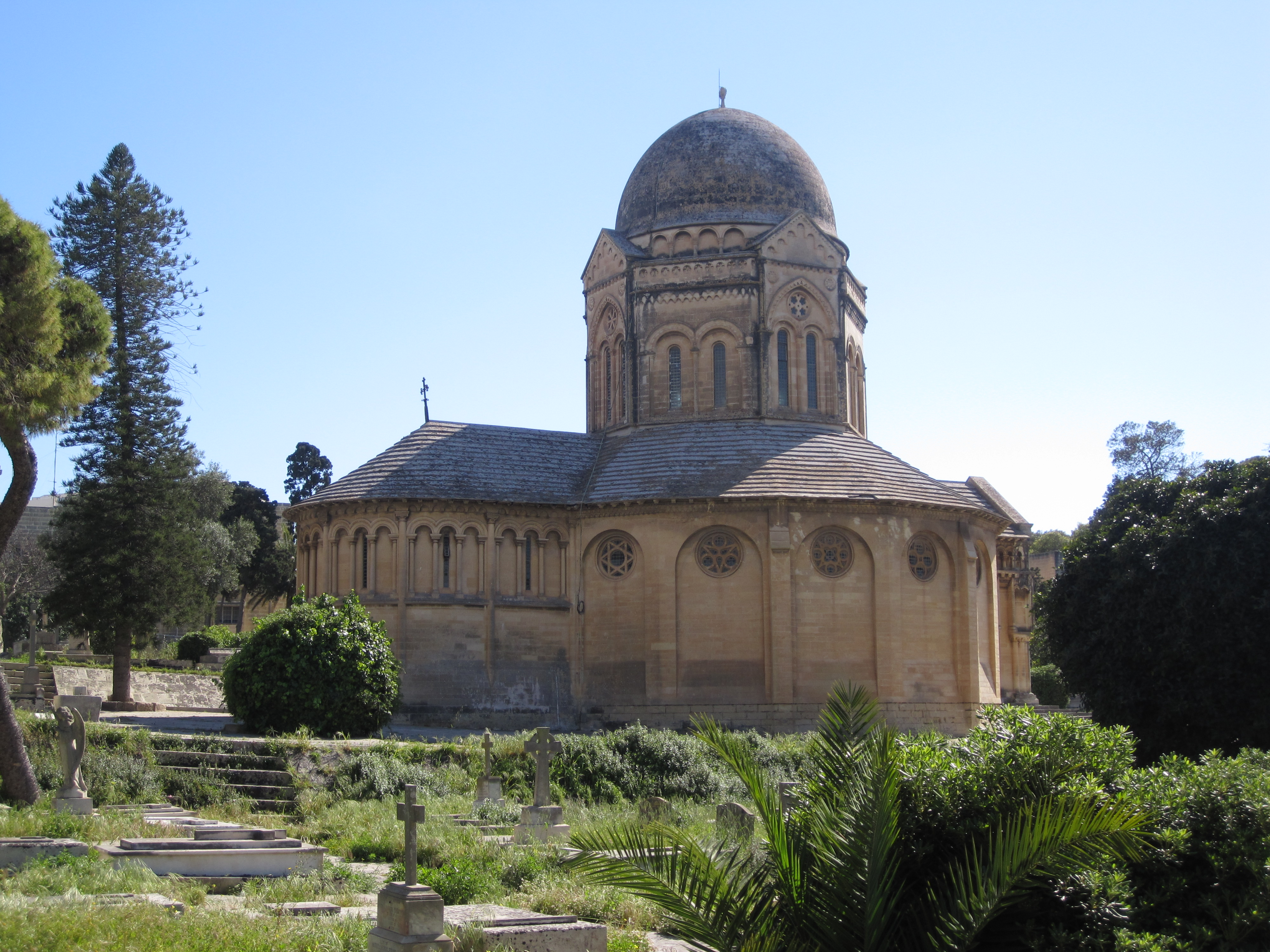
Ta' Braxia Cemetery Chapel

- Lady Rachel Hamilton-Gordon Memorial Chapel
- Santa Venera Parish Church
- Ta' Pinu

=== Gothic Revival architecture ===
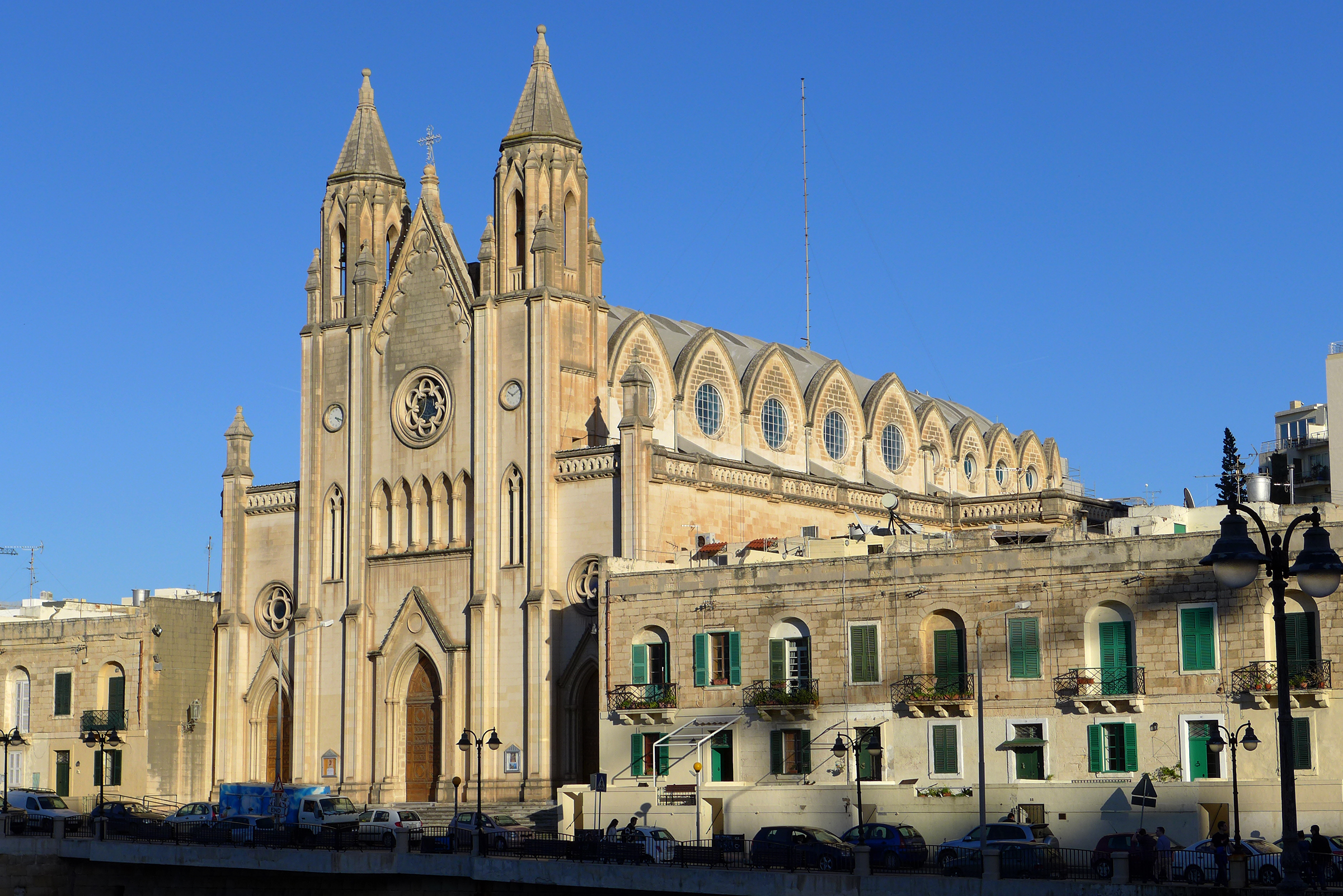
Carmelite Church, Balluta by Gustavo R. Vincenti

- Addolorata Cemetery, Paola
- Palazzo Ferreria
- Sliema Point Battery
- Villa St Ignatius
- Carmelite Church, Balluta
- Church of the Holy Trinity, Sliema
- Lady Rachel Hamilton-Gordon Memorial Chapel
- Our Lady of Loreto Parish Church
- Parish Church of St Cajetan, Ħamrun
- Robert Samut Hall
- St Andrew's Scots Church, Malta
- Casa Gourgion

=== Neo-Renaissance ===
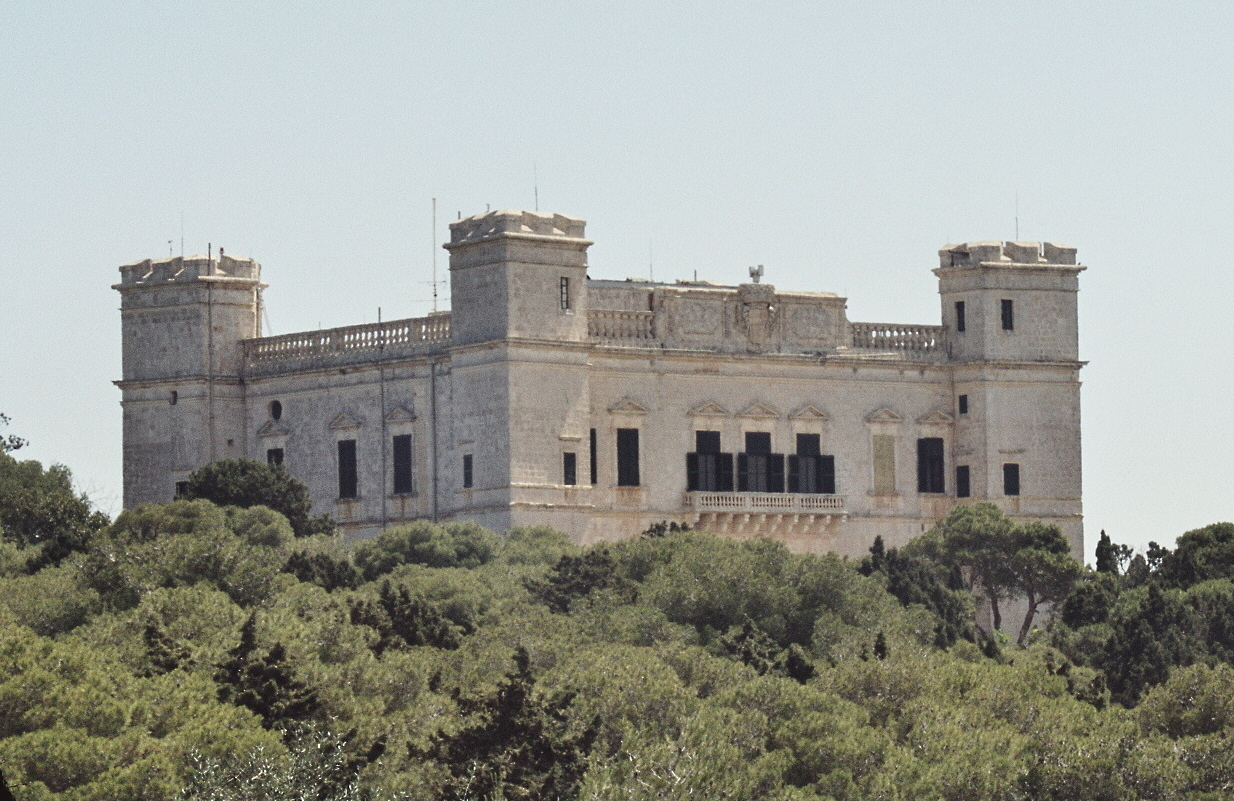
Verdala Palace

- Aedes Danielis
- Old University Building, Valletta
- Parish Church of Our Lady of Graces, Żabbar
- Parish Church of St Mary, Attard
- Parish Church of St Mary, Birkirkara
- St Catherine's Old Church, Żejtun
- Sanctuary of Our Lady of Mellieħa
- Verdala Palace

=== Moorish Revival architecture ===
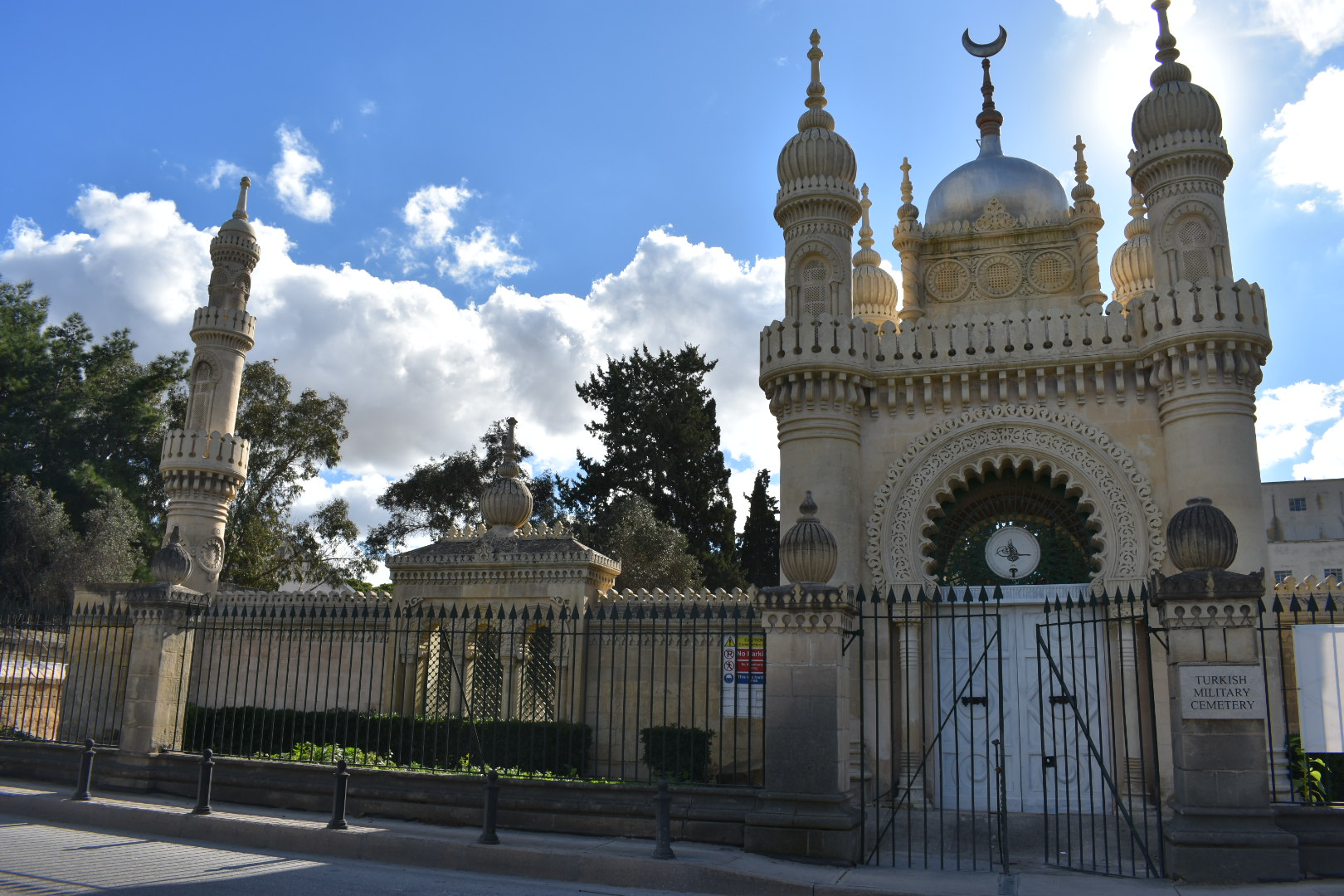
Turkish Military Cemetery by Emanuele Luigi Galizia

- Turkish Military Cemetery by Emanuele Luigi Galizia (1830–1907)
- Villa Alhambra, Sliema by Emanuele Luigi Galizia (1830–1907)

=== Eclecticism ===
- Casino Notabile, Saqqajja, by Webster Paulson (Beaux-Arts architecture), 1888

== 20th century architecture ==
=== Art Nouveau / Art Deco architecture ===
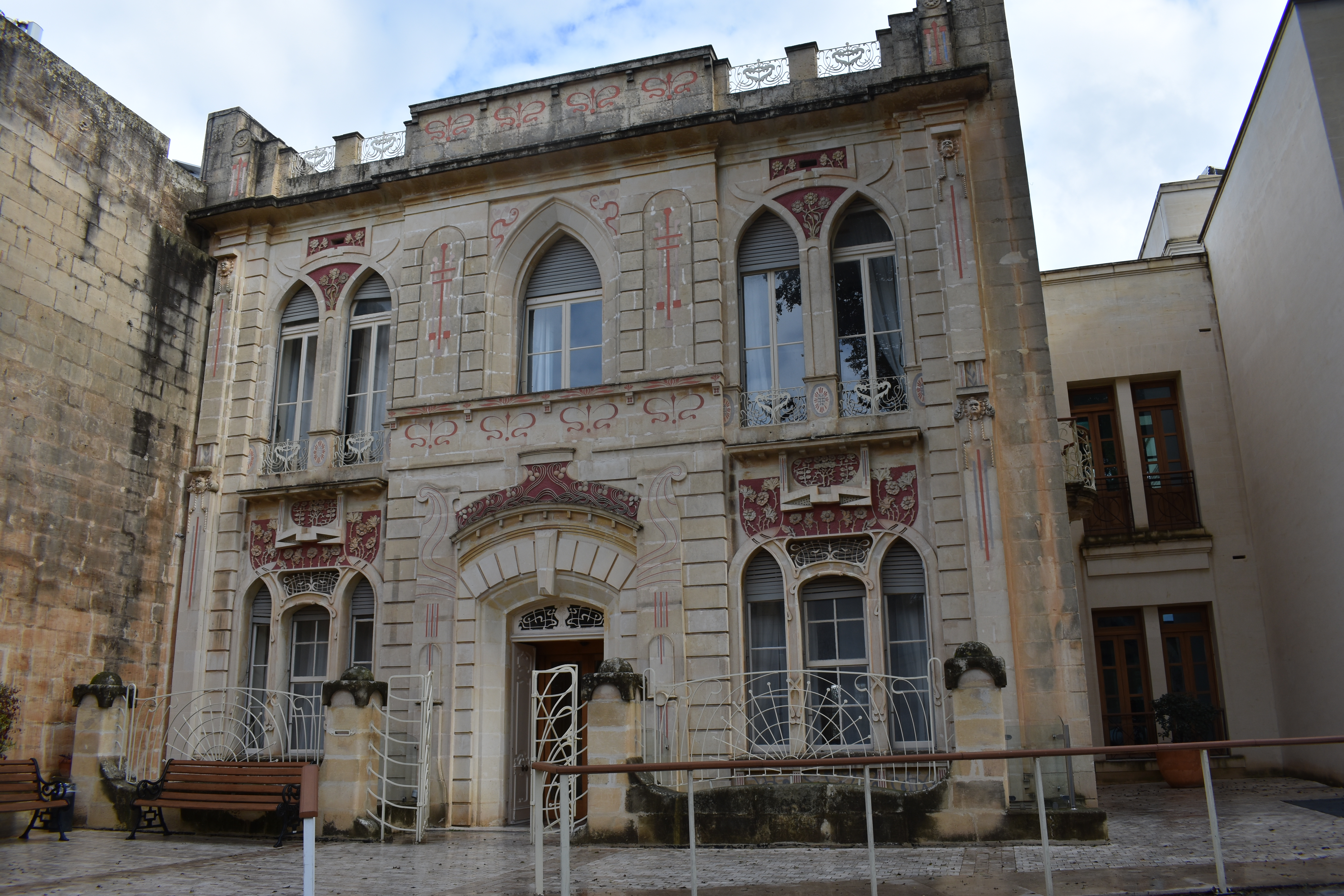
Villa RoseVille in Attard, by Alessandro Manara (1912) and Emanuele Borg (1921)

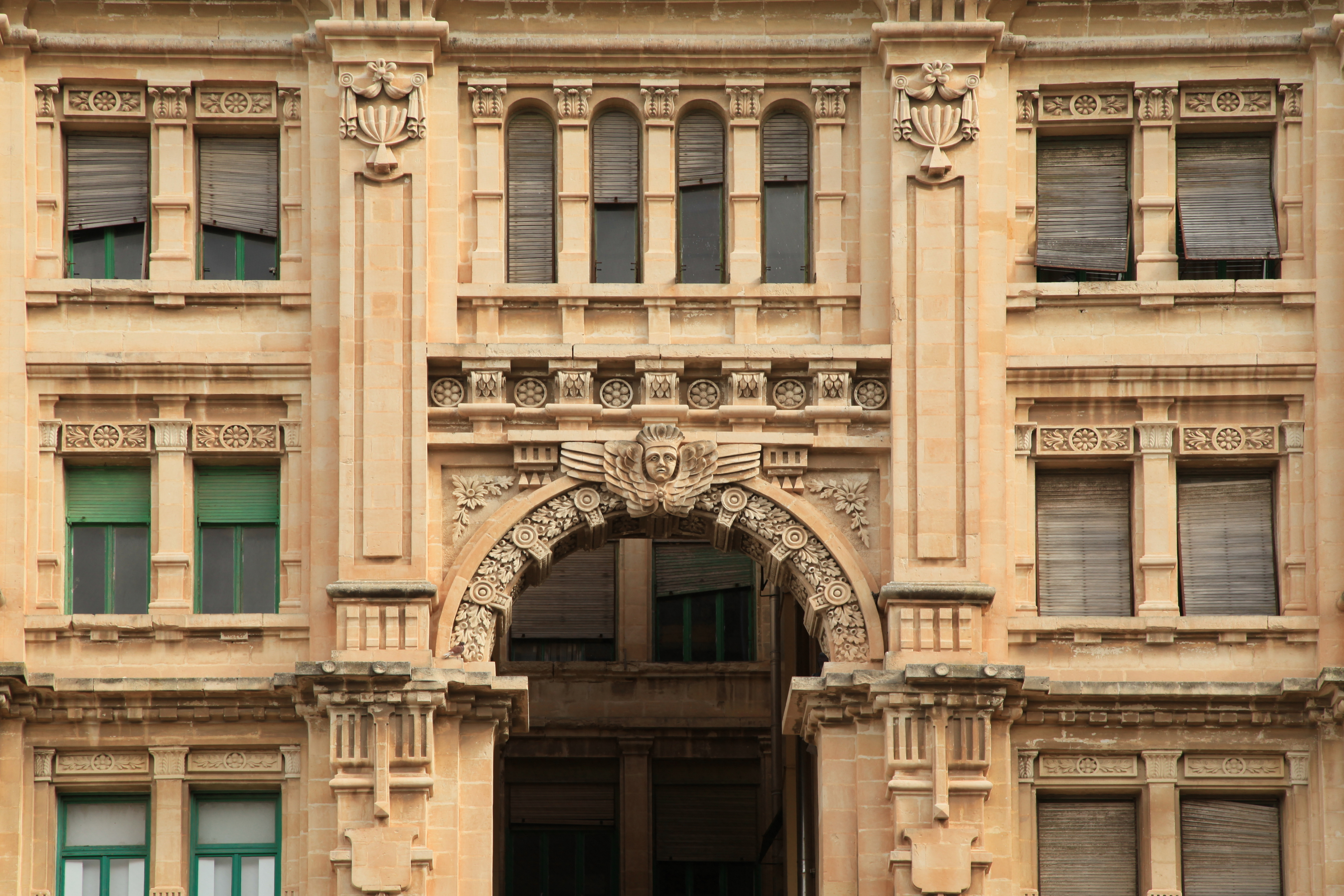
Balluta Buildings by Giuseppe Psaila, 1928

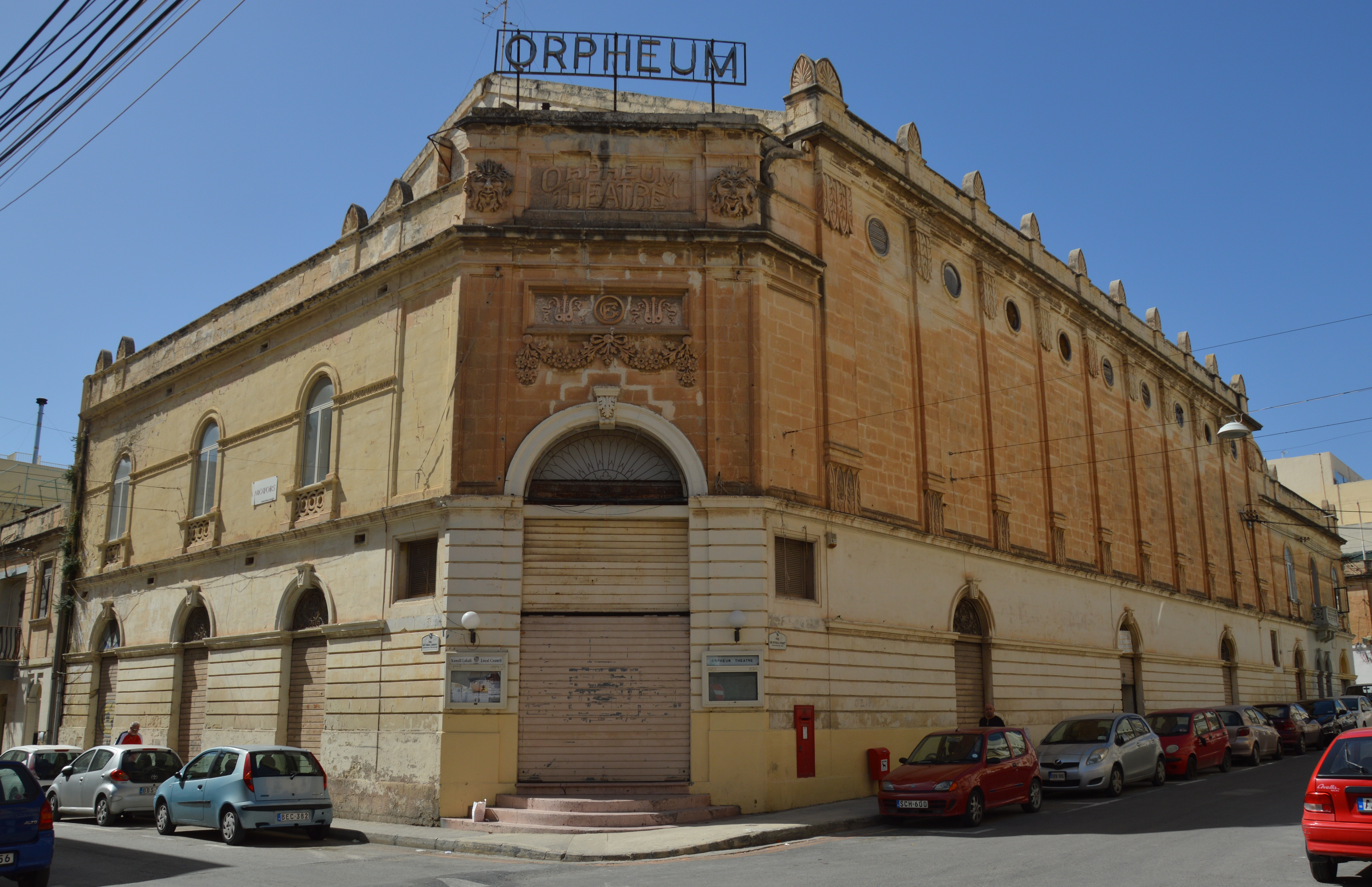
Orpheum Theatre (Malta) in Gżira, by Harold J. Borg, 1932, Spanish Art Nouveau style

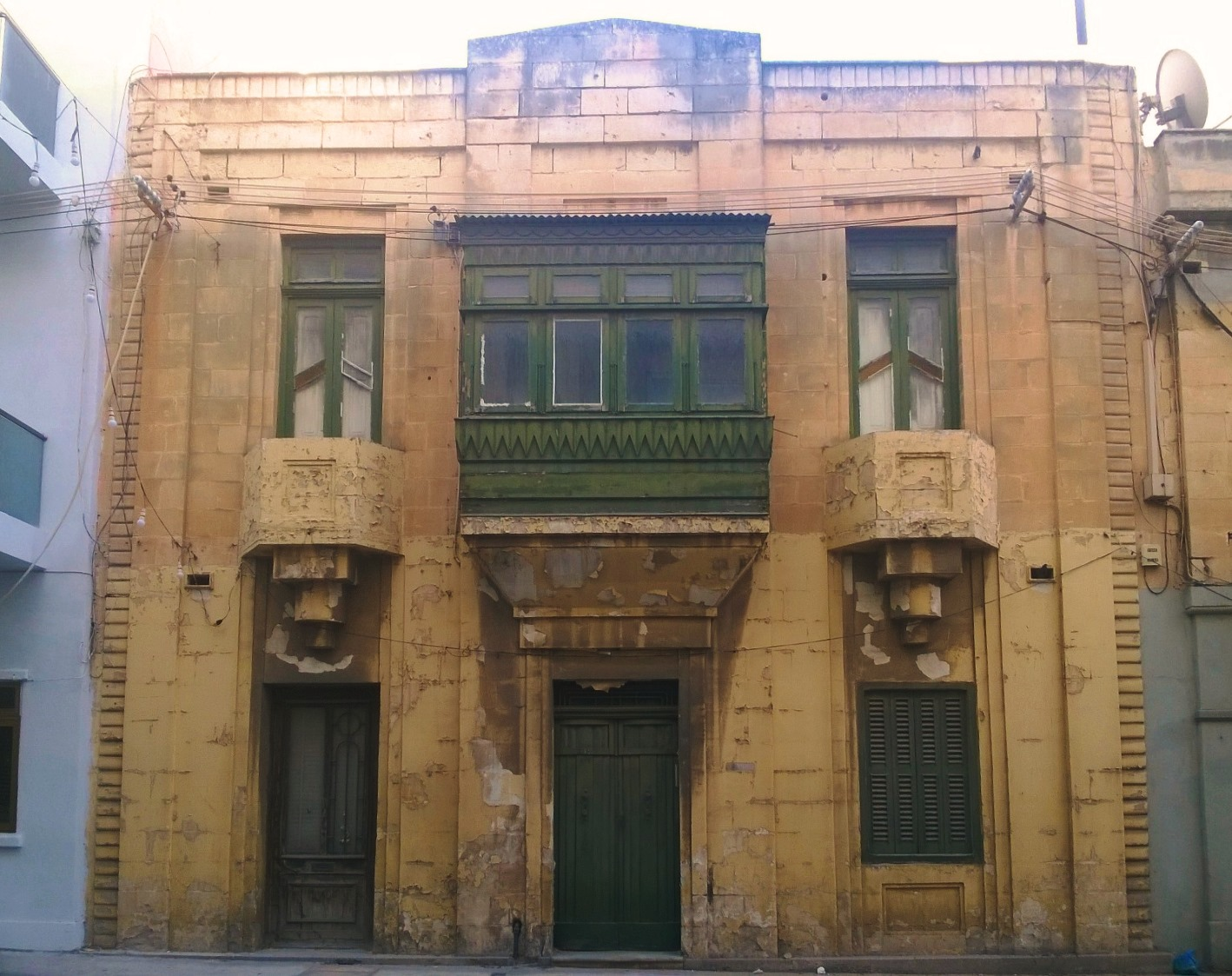
Private residence of Joseph Colombo in Triq d'Argens (Gżira), 1936. The traditional townhouse had been reinterpreted in a modernist style making use of strong geometric motifs.

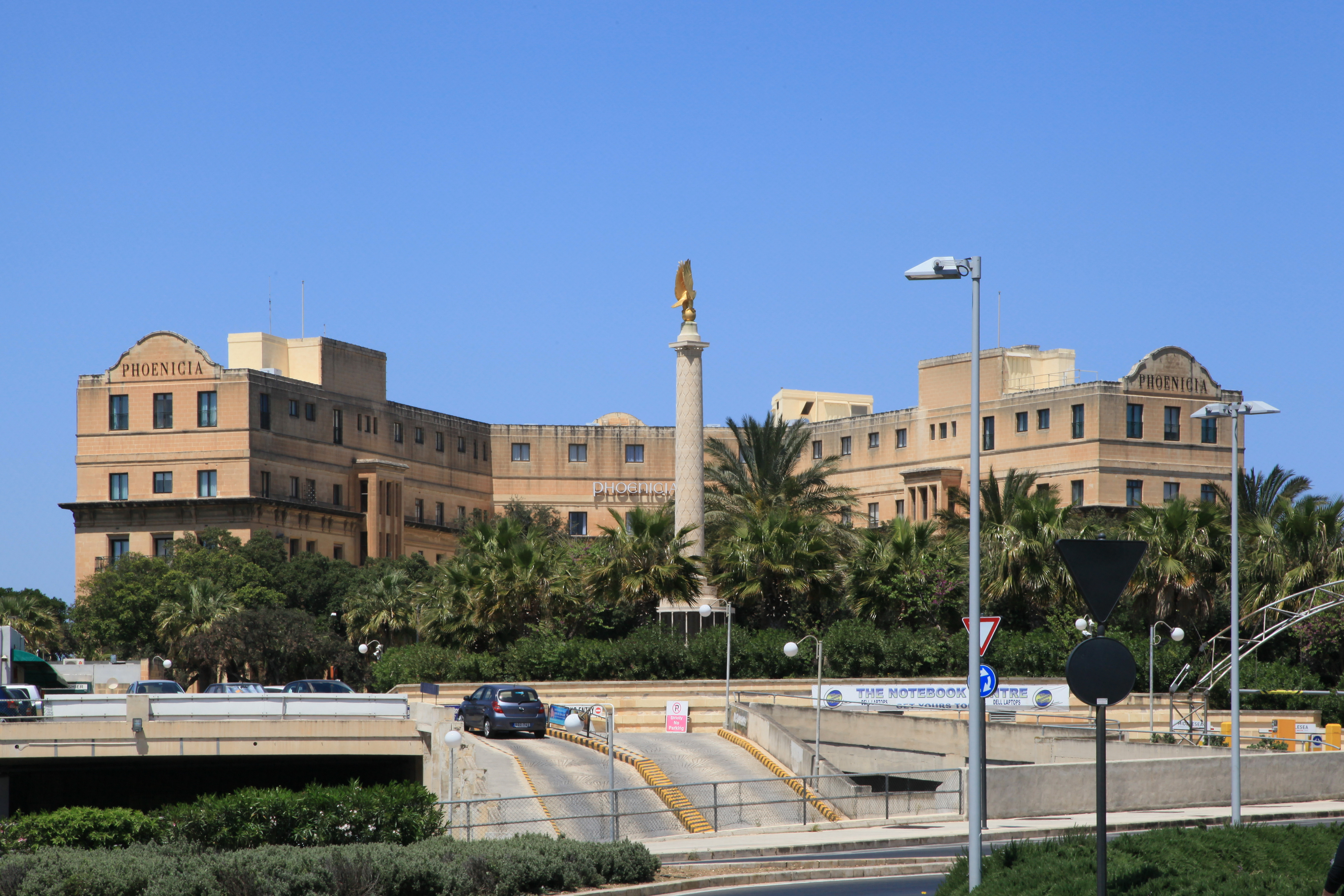
Hotel Phoenicia in Floriana, by William Binnie, 1936–39

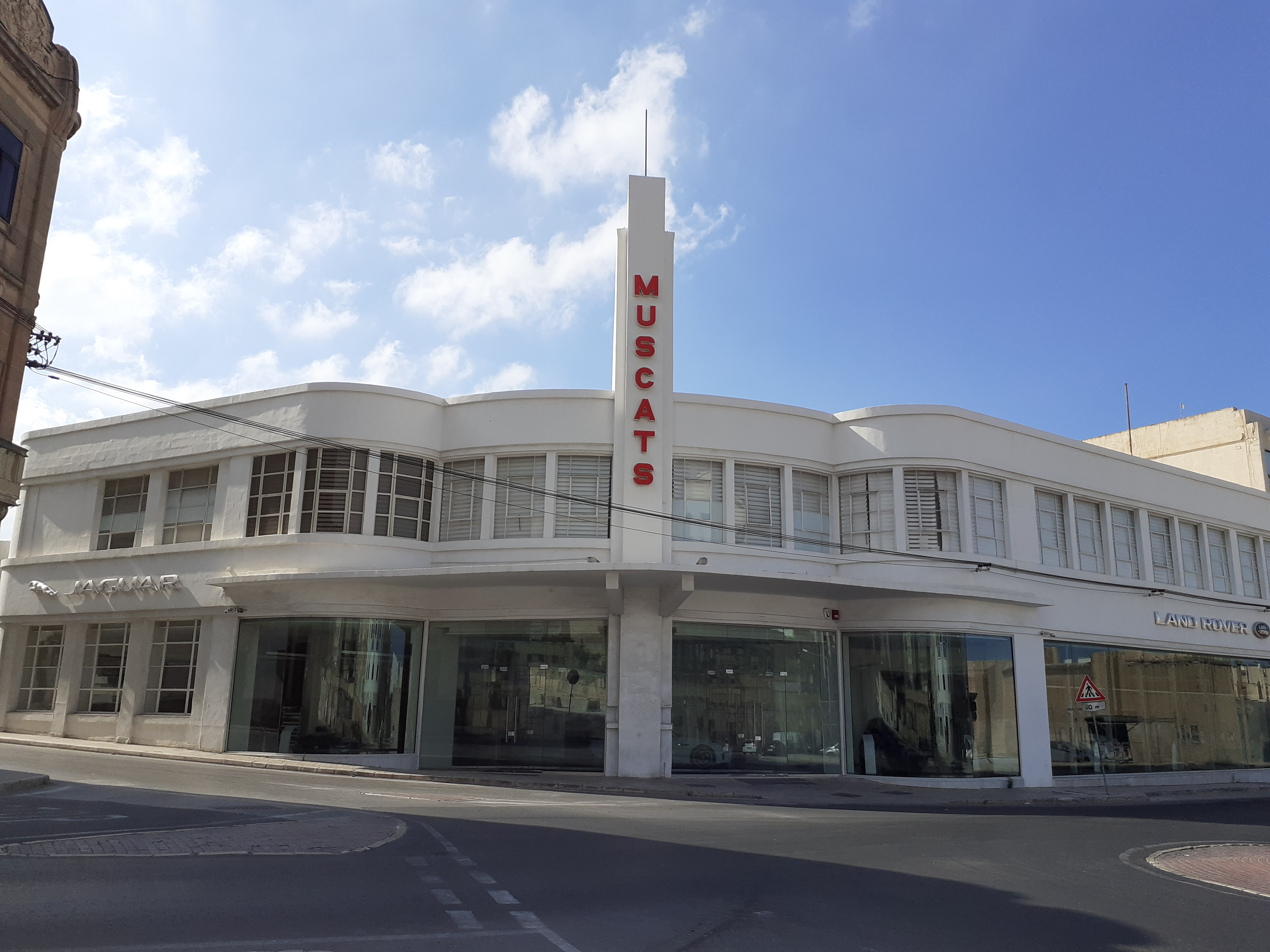
Muscats Motors in Gżira by Joseph Colombo, 1945, Streamline Moderne style

=== Modernist architecture ===
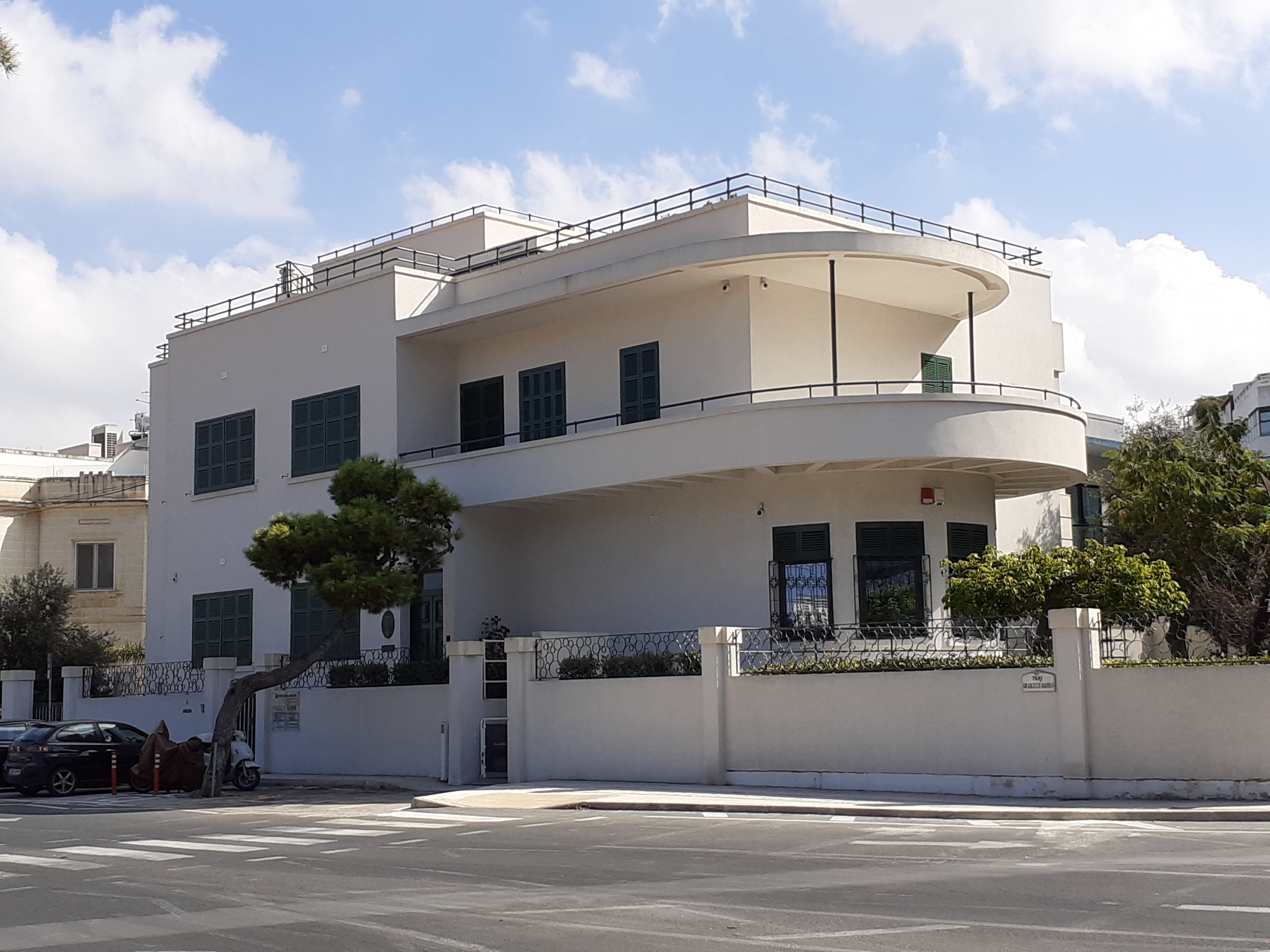
Villino Ellul in Ta' Xbiex by Salvatore Ellul, 1937–38

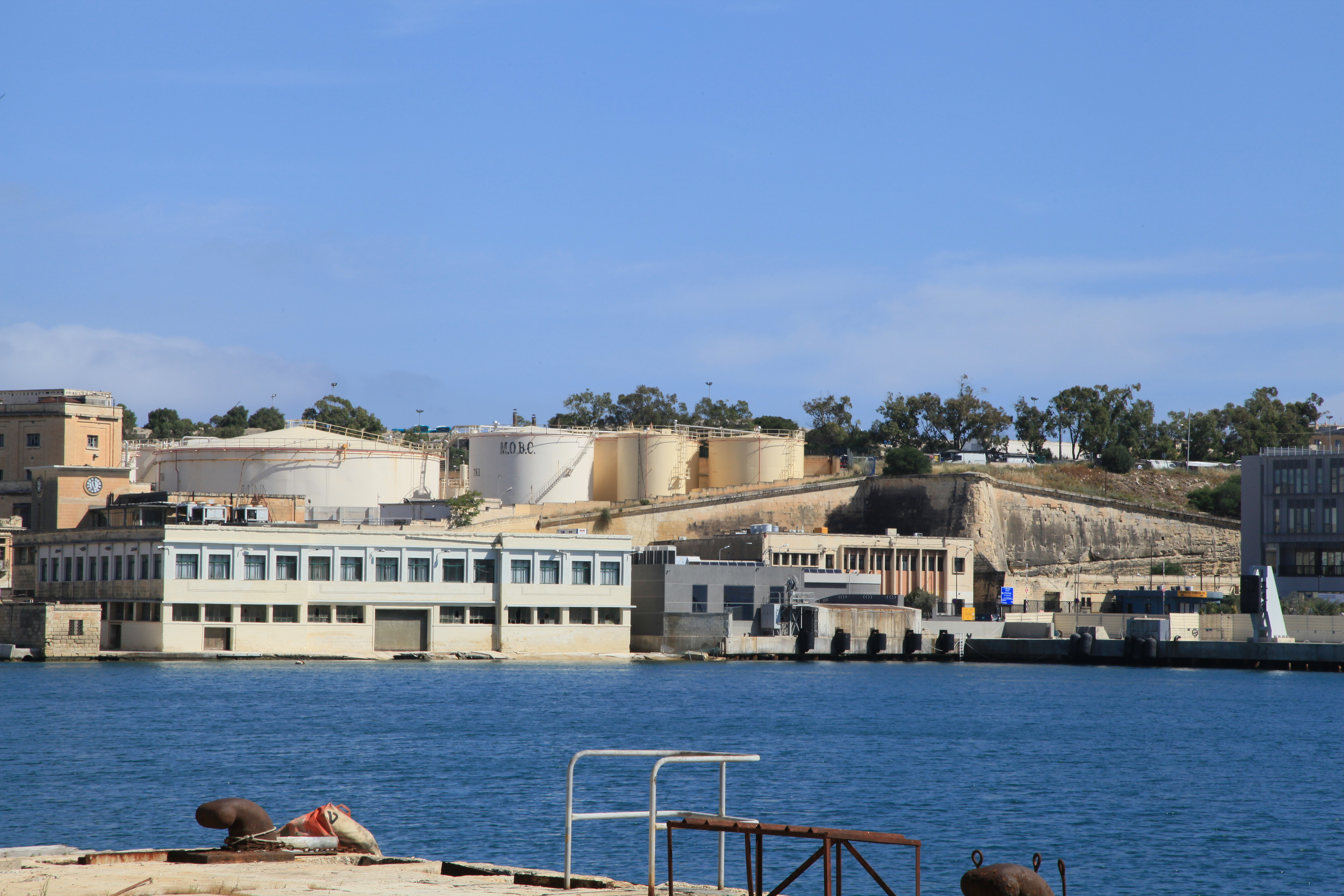
Sea Malta Building by Mortimer and de Giorgio Architects, 1949

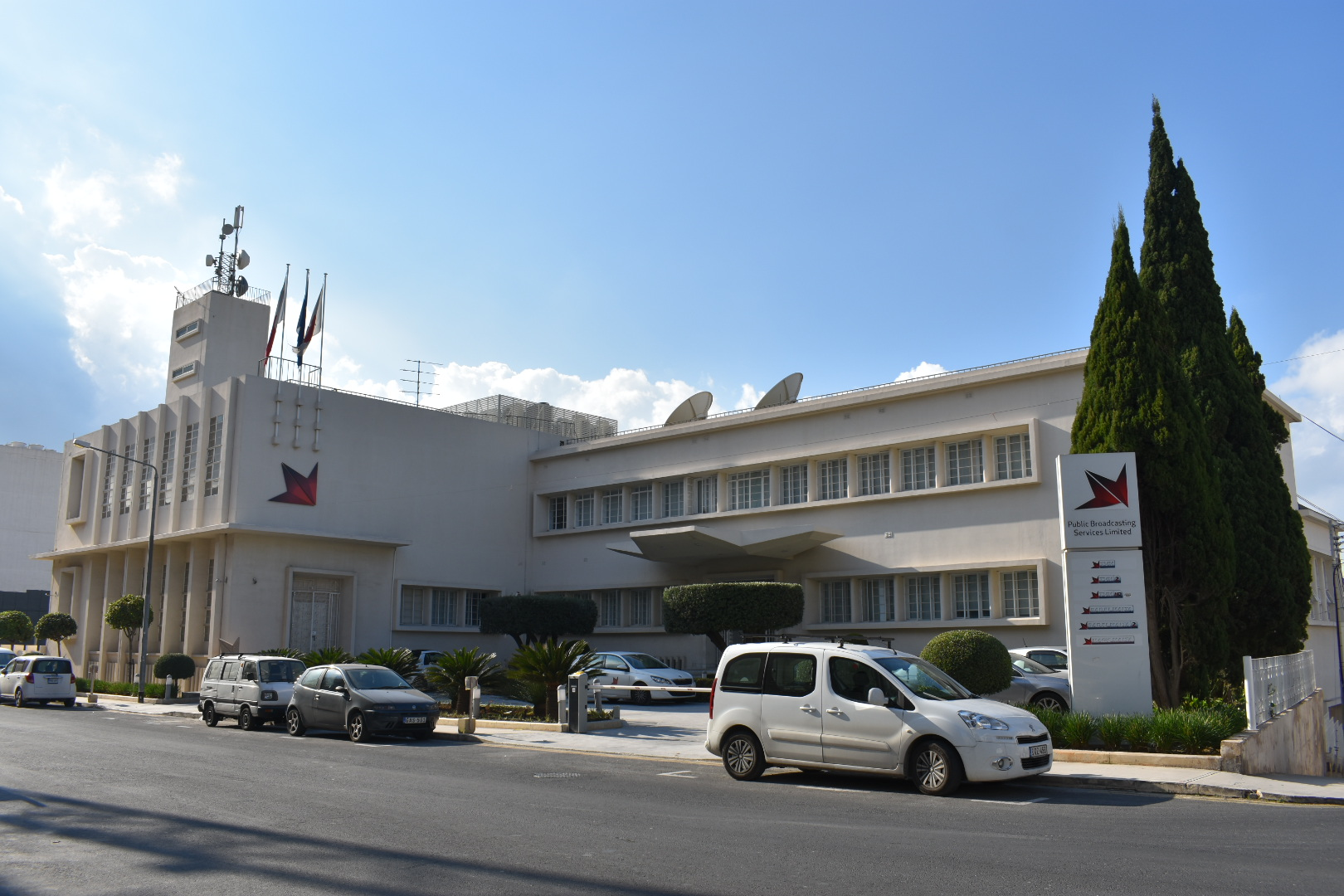
Rediffusion House by Carmelo Falzon, 1958

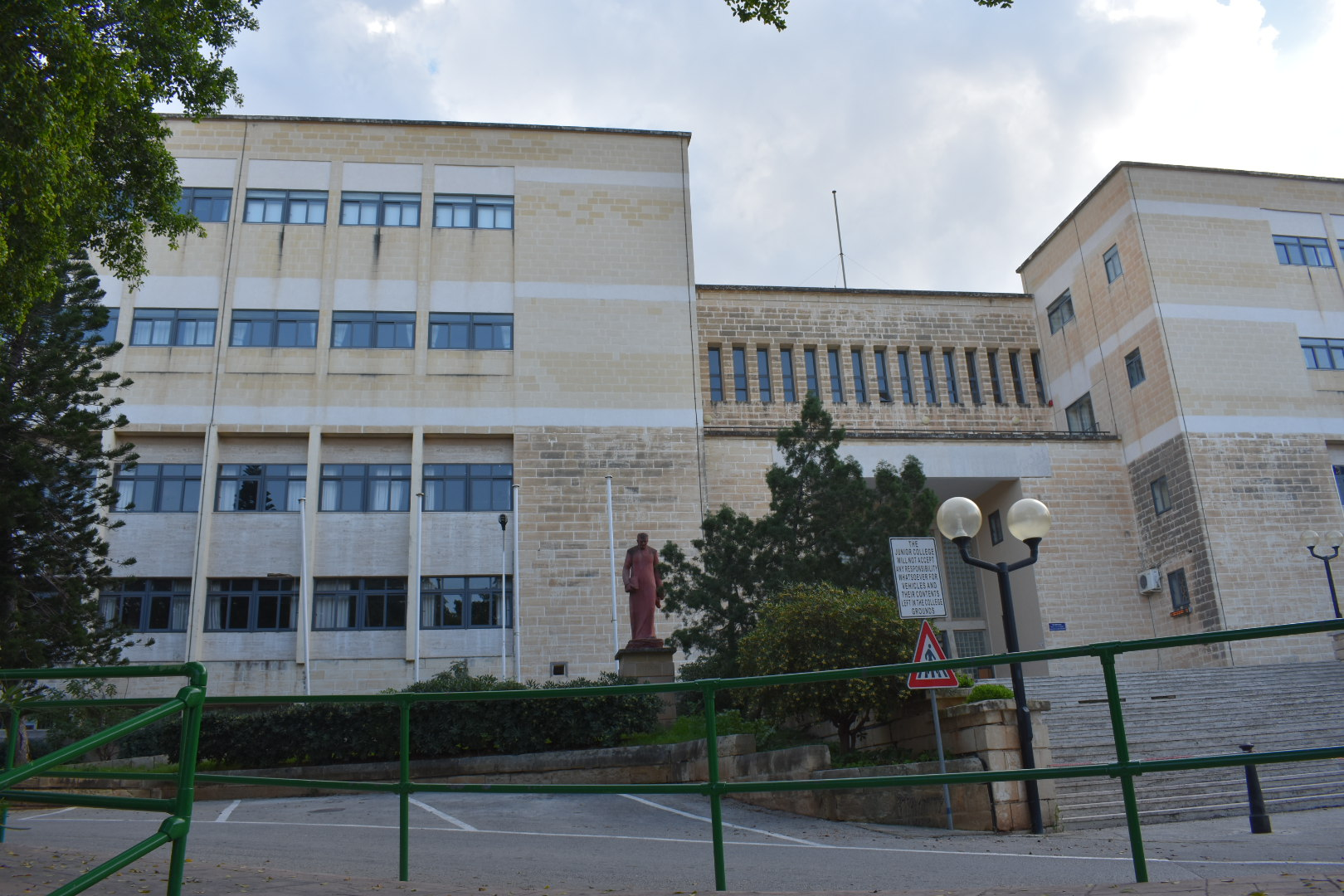
Ġ. F. Abela Junior College by Victor Anastasi, 1962–66

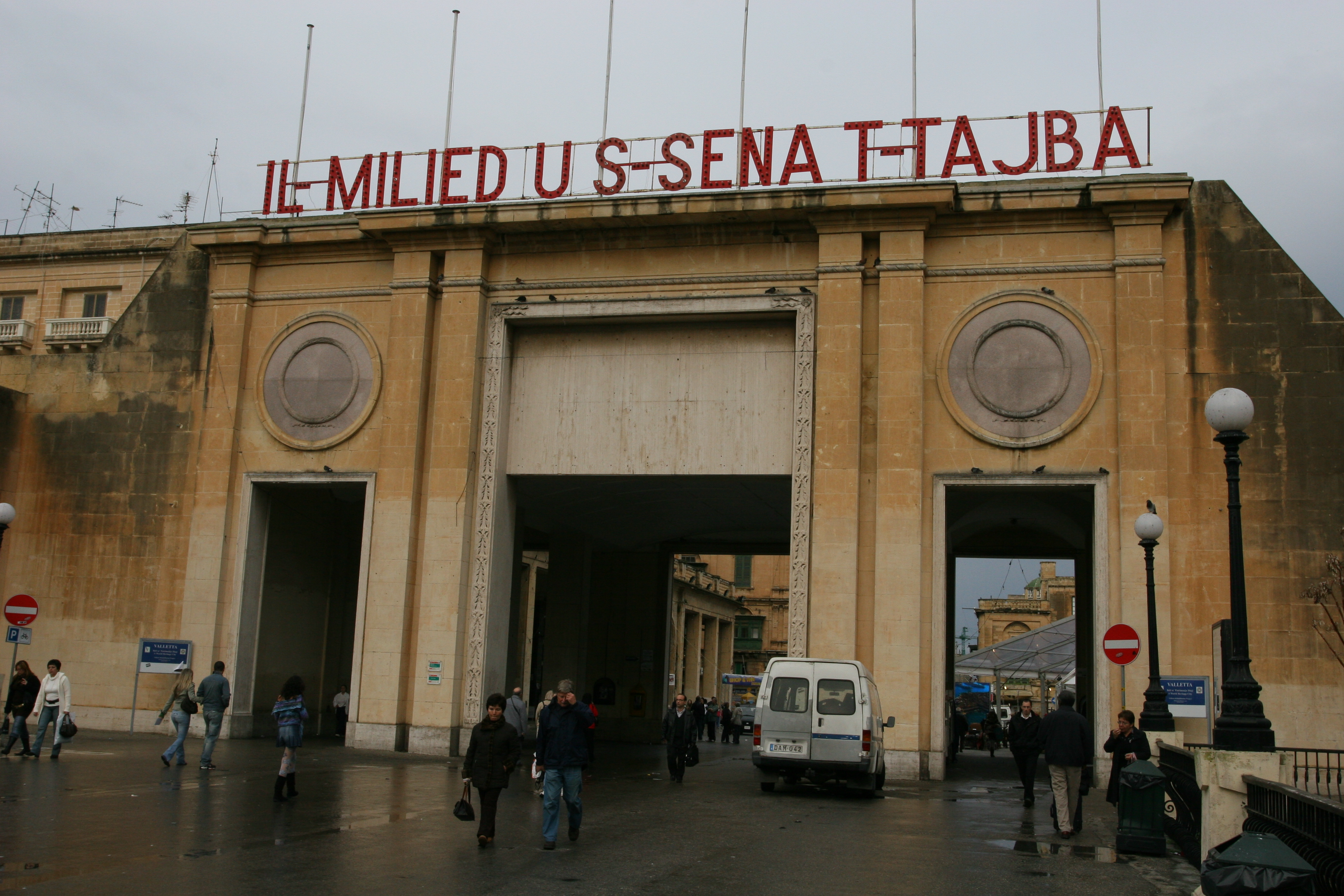
Alziro Bergonzo's Fourth Gate of Valletta, 1964–65

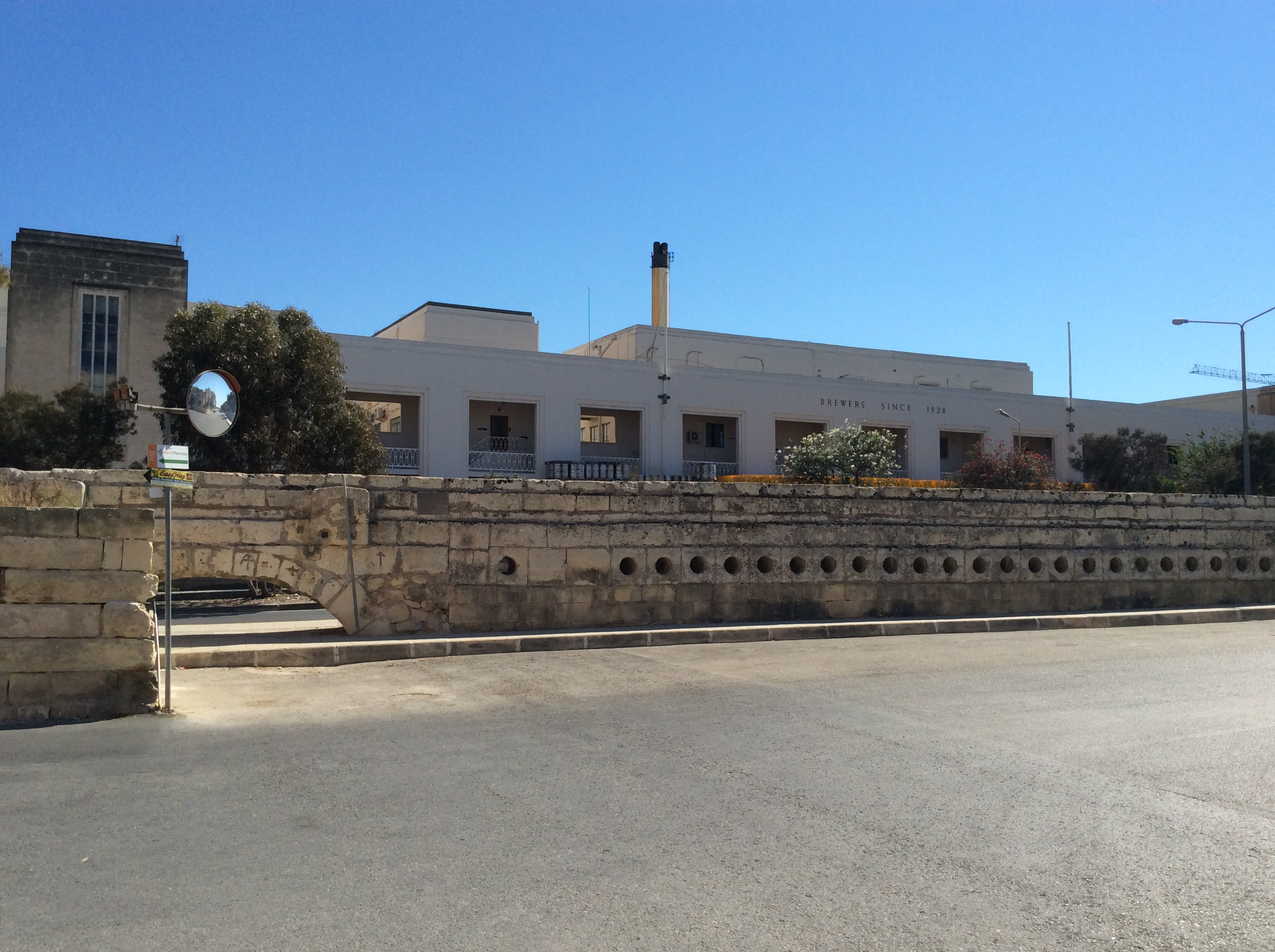
William B. Binnie's and Lewis V. Farrugia's Farsons Brewery
- Joseph G. Huntingford

== Contemporary architecture ==
- The Barrakka Lift - Architect: Architecture Project Valletta
- St James Cavalier Centre for Creativity - Architect: Richard England
- DB House - Architect: Forward Architects
- Strait Street Public Toilets - Architect: Chris Briffa Architects
- House of Four Winds (Bank of Valletta, Chairperson’s Office) - Architect: DeMicoli & Associates Architects
- New Parliament Building by Renzo Piano

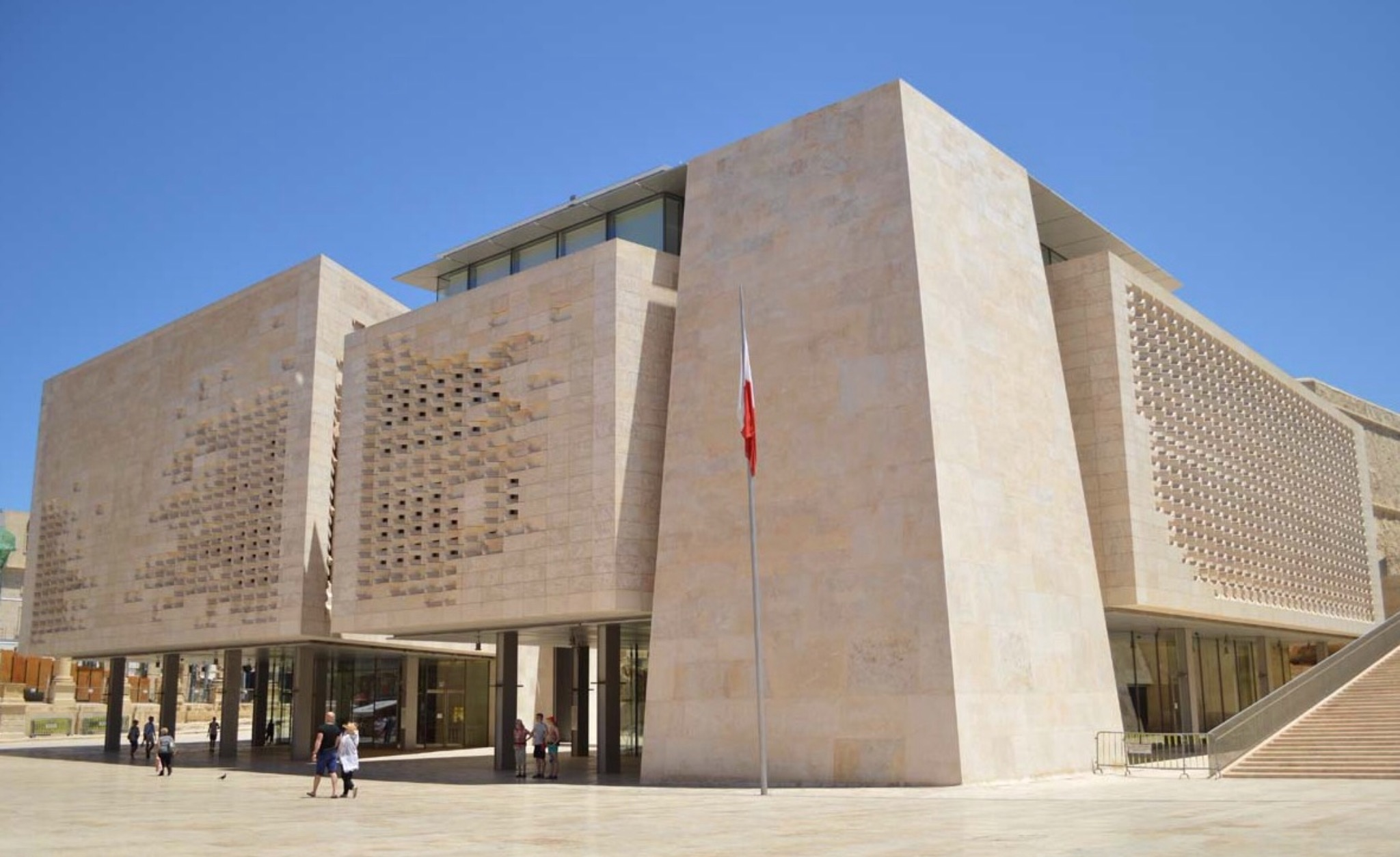
Parliament House (Malta) by Renzo Piano

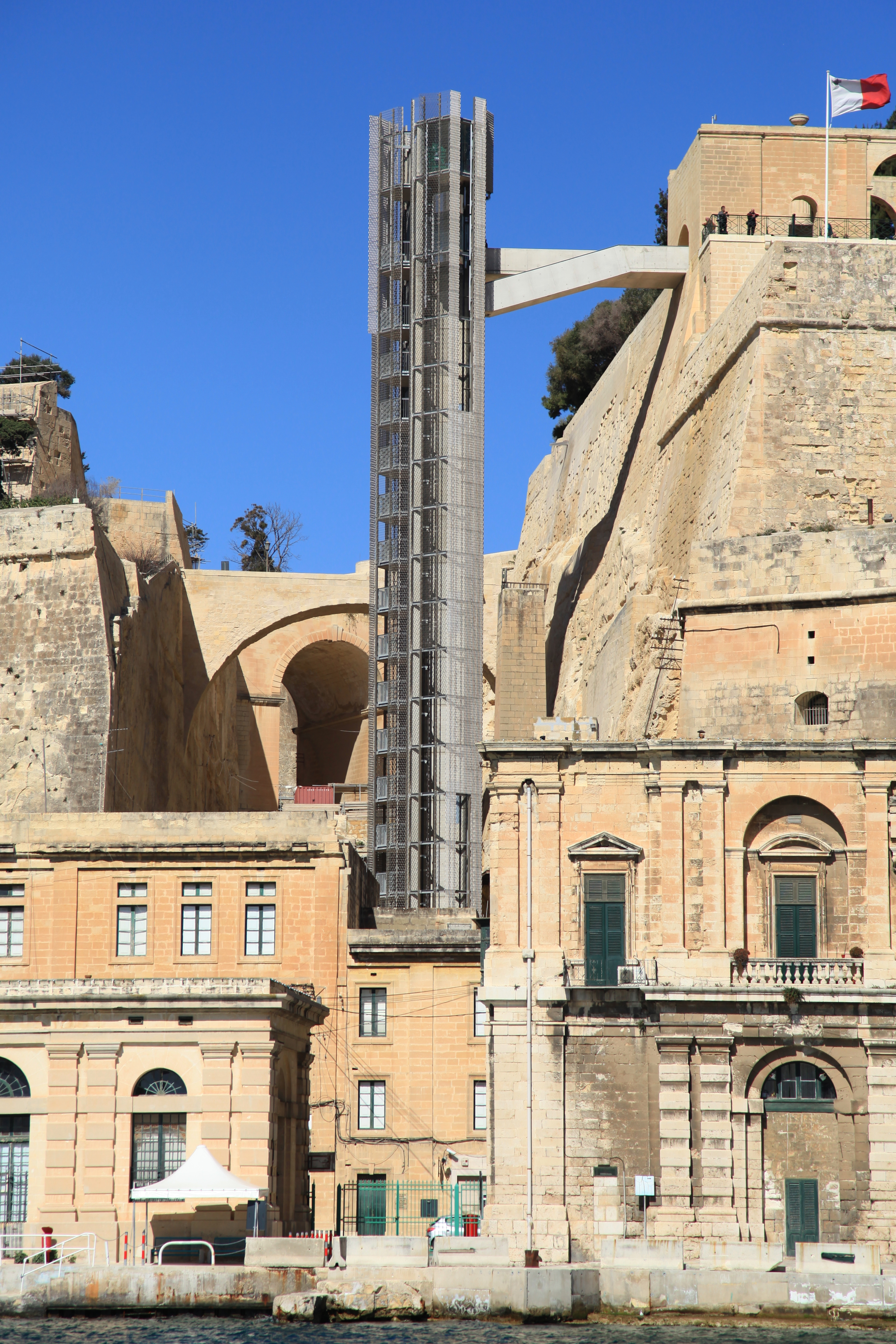
Barrakka Lift by Architecture Project Valletta

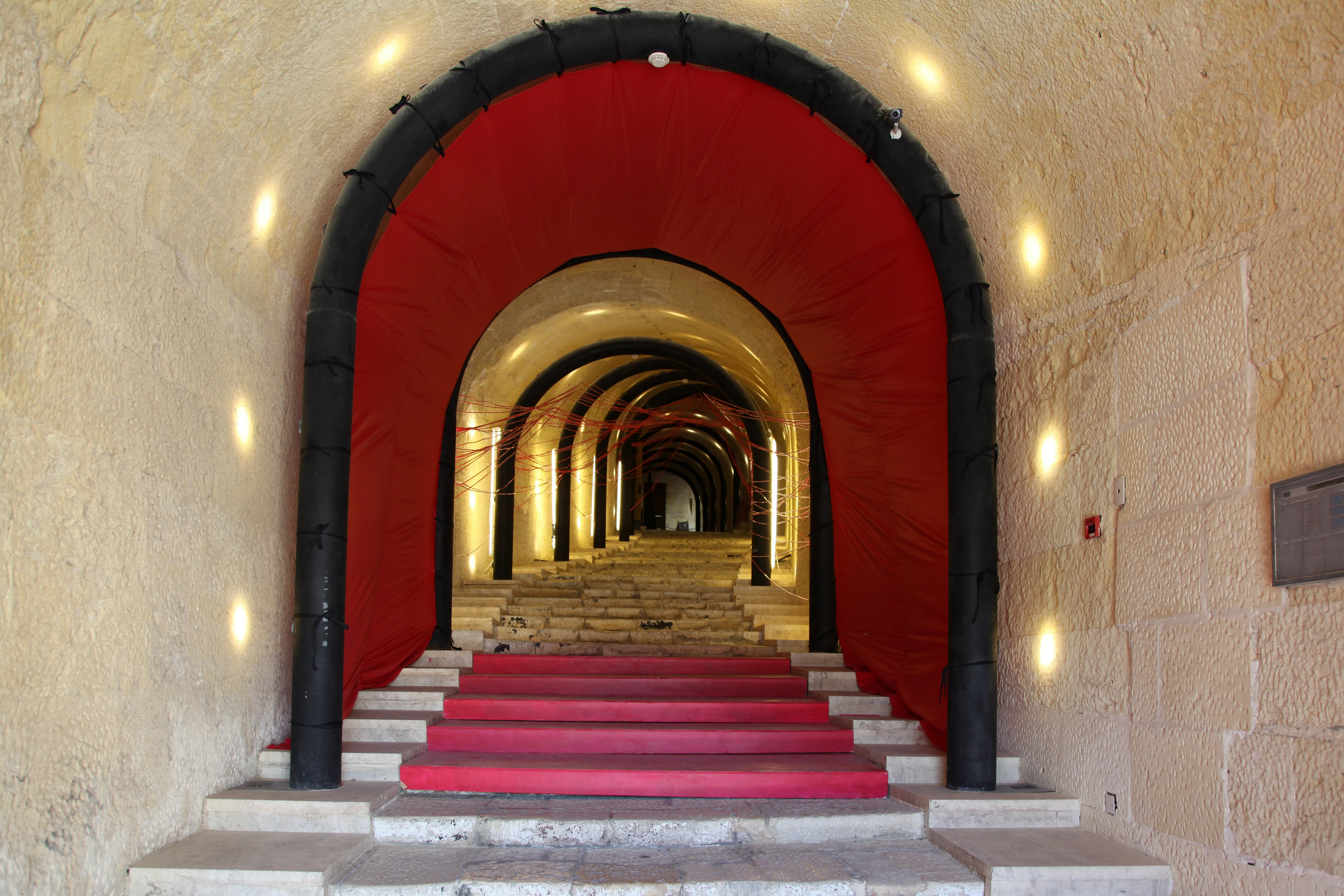
Saint James Cavalier Centre for Creativity by Richard England

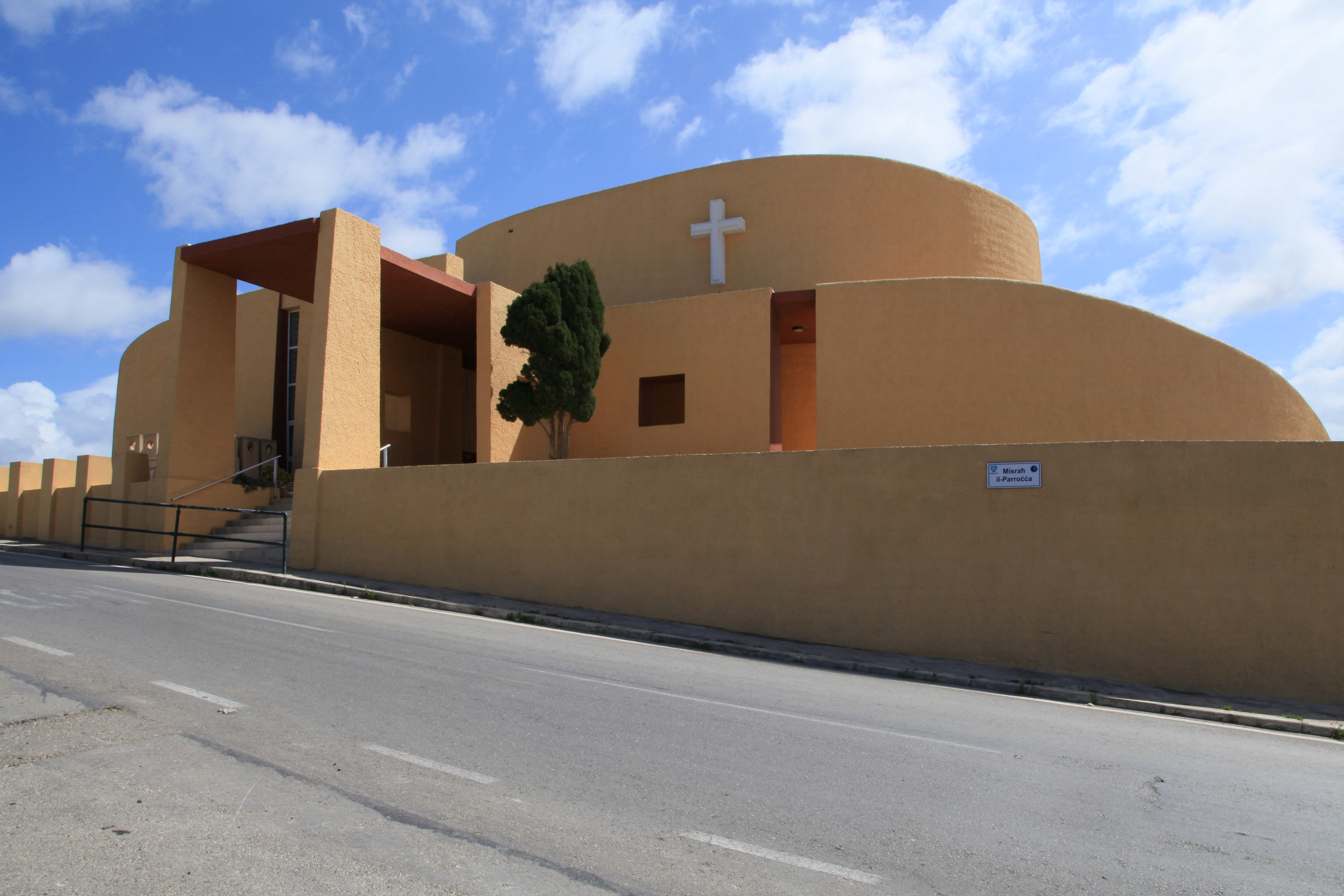
Manikata Parish Church, by Richard England

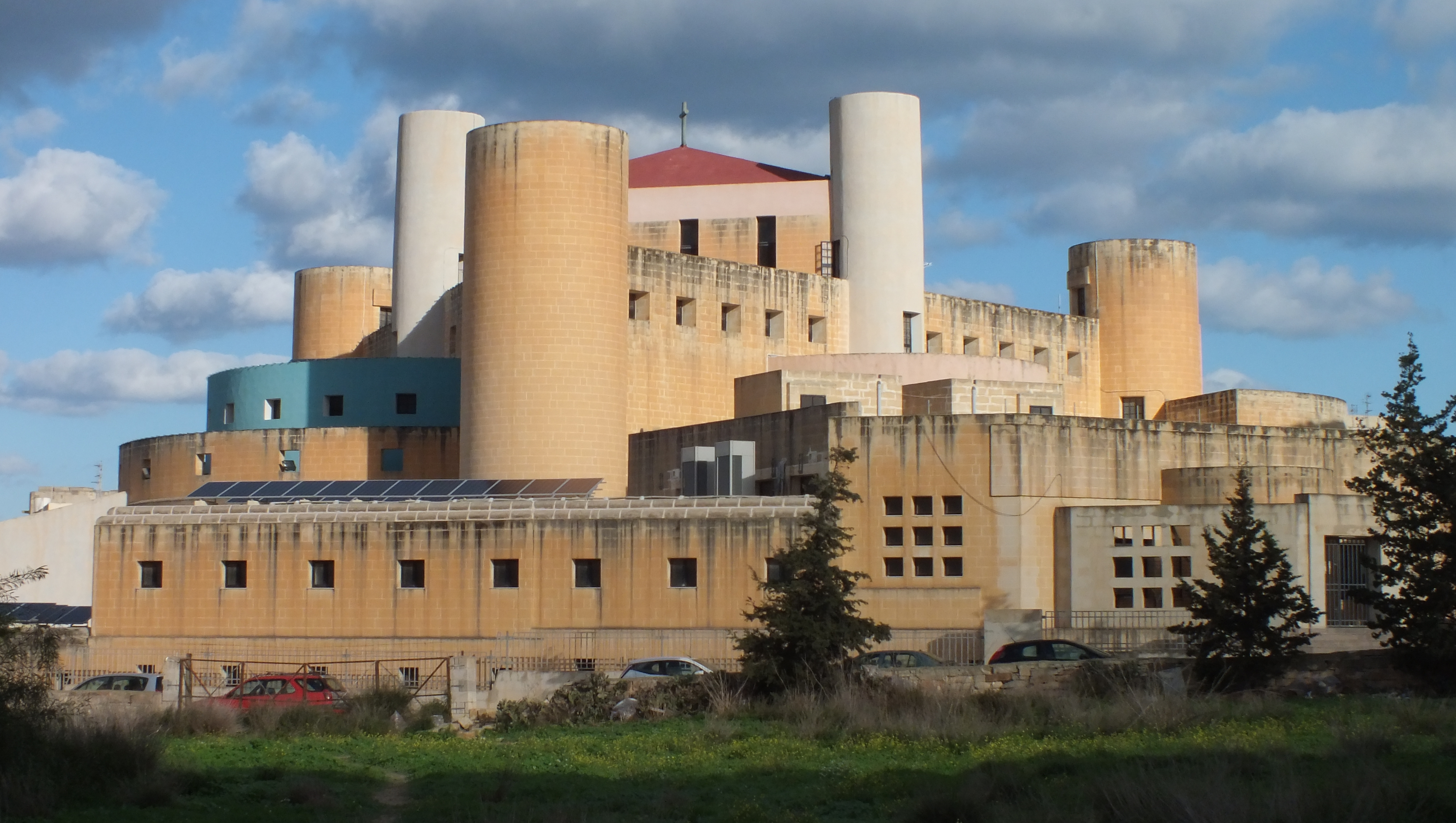
St Francis of Assisi Church in Qawra, by Richard England

== Notable Maltese architects ==
- Giovanni Attard (c. 1570–1636)
- Giovanni Barbara (1642–1728)
- Andrea Belli (1703–1772)
- Giuseppe Bonavia (1821–1885)
- Giuseppe Bonici (1707–1779)
- Antonio Cachia (1739–1813)
- Domenico Cachia (c. 1690–1761)
- Michele Cachia (1760–1839)
- Girolamo Cassar (c. 1520–c. 1592)
- Vittorio Cassar (c. 1550–c. 1609)
- Cesar Castellani (died 1905)
- Ġużè Damato (1886–1963)
- Tommaso Dingli (1591–1666)
- Salvatore Ellul (1891–1961)
- Richard England (born 1937)
- Antonio Falzon (16th century)
- Lorenzo Gafà (1639–1703)
- Emanuele Luigi Galizia (1830–1907)
- Carlo Gimach (1651–1730)
- Giorgio Grognet de Vassé (1774–1862)
- Joseph G. Huntingford (1926–1994)
- Giuseppe Psaila (1891–1960)
- Giorgio Pullicino (1779–1851)
- Giorgio Costantino Schinas (1834–1894)
- Joseph M. Spiteri (1934–2013)
- Andrea Vassallo (1856–1928)
- Gustavo R. Vincenti (1888–1974)
- Francesco Zerafa (1679–1758)

== See also ==
- Gozo Farmhouse
