= List of monuments in Attard =

This is a list of monuments in Attard, Malta, which are listed on the National Inventory of the Cultural Property of the Maltese Islands.

== List ==
Name of object	Location	Coordinates	ID	Photo	Upload
Statues of St Peter and St Paul	89 Triq San'Antnin / Trejqet ta' Regin	35°53′44″N 14°26′42″E	00145	Statues of St Peter and St Paul	Upload Photo
Church of the Annunciation	Triq il-Kbira / Triq L-Imdina	35°53′24″N 14°26′31″E	00146	Church of the Annunciation	Upload Photo
Niche Immaculate Conception	16A Triq il-Kbira	35°53′25″N 14°26′33″E	00147	Niche Immaculate Conception	Upload Photo
Parish Church of Saint Mary	Misrah il-Knisja	35°53′27″N 14°26′36″E	00148	Parish Church of Saint Mary	Upload Photo
Niche The Assumption	Triq il-Kbira / Triq il-Mosta	35°53′27″N 14°26′35″E	00149	Niche The Assumption	Upload Photo
Niche of the Assumption	Triq Sant' Anna / Triq San Duminku	35°53′30″N 14°26′35″E	00150	Niche of the Assumption	Upload Photo
Chapel of St Roque	Triq Sant' Anna	35°53′32″N 14°26′34″E	00151	Chapel of St Roque	Upload Photo
Niche of St Domenic	39 Triq San Duminku	35°53′31″N 14°26′37″E	00152	?sequence=1&isAllowed=y Niche of St Domenic	Upload Photo
Niche of St Joseph	Triq il-Kbira / Triq San Duminku	35°53′31″N 14°26′37″E	00153	Niche of St Joseph	Upload Photo
Niche of Our Lady of Graces	12 Triq il-Mithna	35°53′33″N 14°26′36″E	00154	Niche of Our Lady of Graces	Upload Photo
Niche of the Immaculate Conception	8 Triq Sant'Anna	35°53′29″N 14°26′35″E	00155	Niche of the Immaculate Conception	Upload Photo
Niche of St Paul	Triq San Pawl	35°53′21″N 14°26′35″E	00156	Niche of St Paul	Upload Photo
Chapel of St Paul	Triq San Pawl	35°53′20″N 14°26′37″E	00157	Chapel of St Paul	Upload Photo
Church of Christ the Saviour (replaced before listing)	Triq is-Salvatur	35°53′21″N 14°26′18″E	00158		Upload Photo
Niche of Our Lady of Graces (destroyed)	28 Triq L-Imdina	35°53′23″N 14°26′25″E	00159	Niche of Our Lady of Graces (destroyed)	Upload Photo
Villa Bologna	Triq San'Antnin	35°53′40″N 14°26′40″E	01150	Villa Bologna	Upload Photo
Rose Ville	Triq San'Antnin	35°53′39″N 14°26′42″E	01151	Rose Ville	Upload Photo
San Antonio Palace and Gardens	Triq San'Antnin	35°53′47″N 14°26′48″E	01152	San Antonio Palace and Gardens	Upload Photo
Wignacourt Aqueduct	Qrib San'Antnin / Triq Peter Paul Rubens	35°53′35″N 14°26′57″E	01153	Wignacourt Aqueduct	Upload Photo
