= Giovanni Attard =

Maltese architect, military engineer and stone carver (c. 1570–1636)

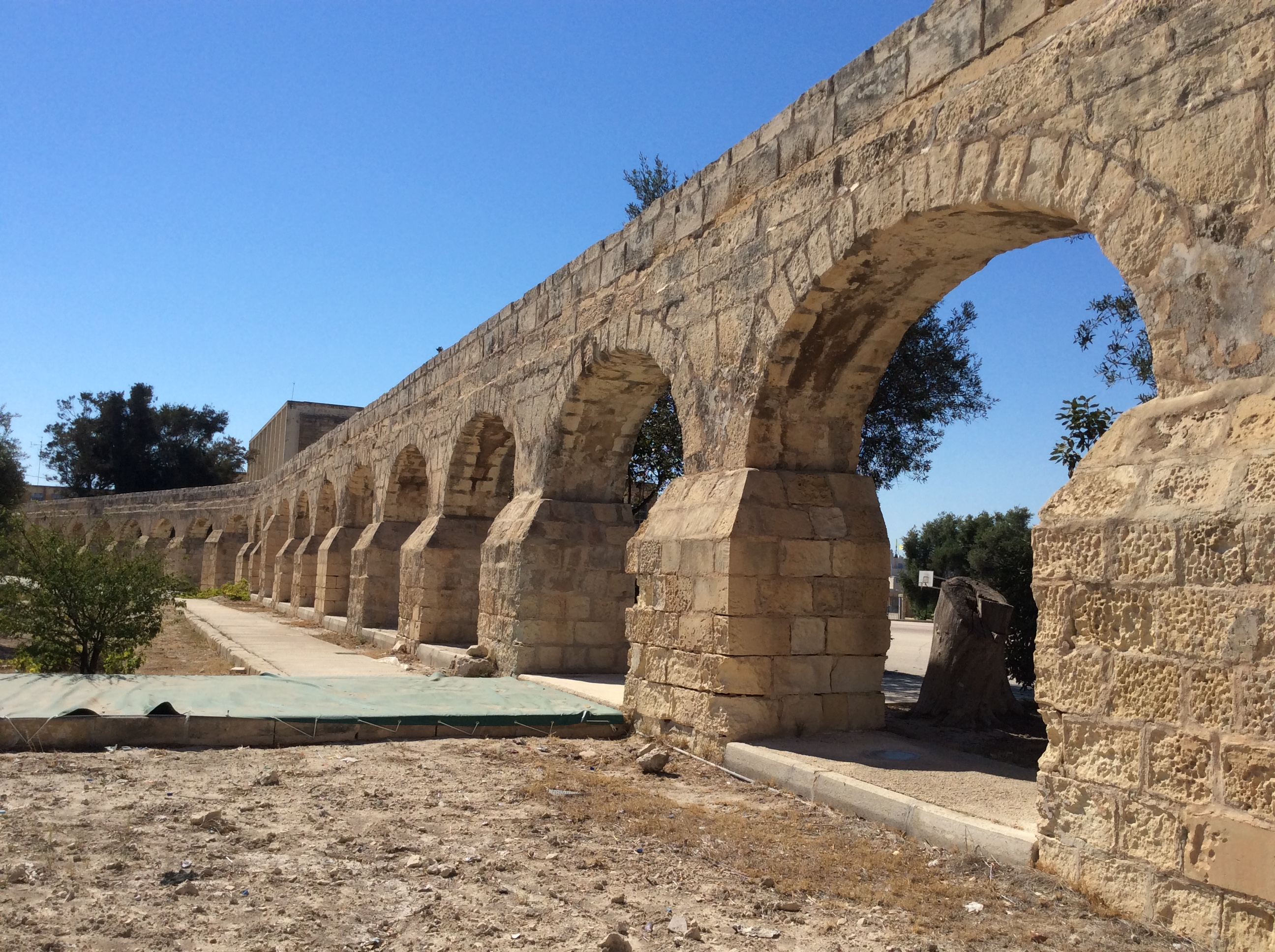
Attard came up with the idea to construct arches to carry parts of the Wignacourt Aqueduct

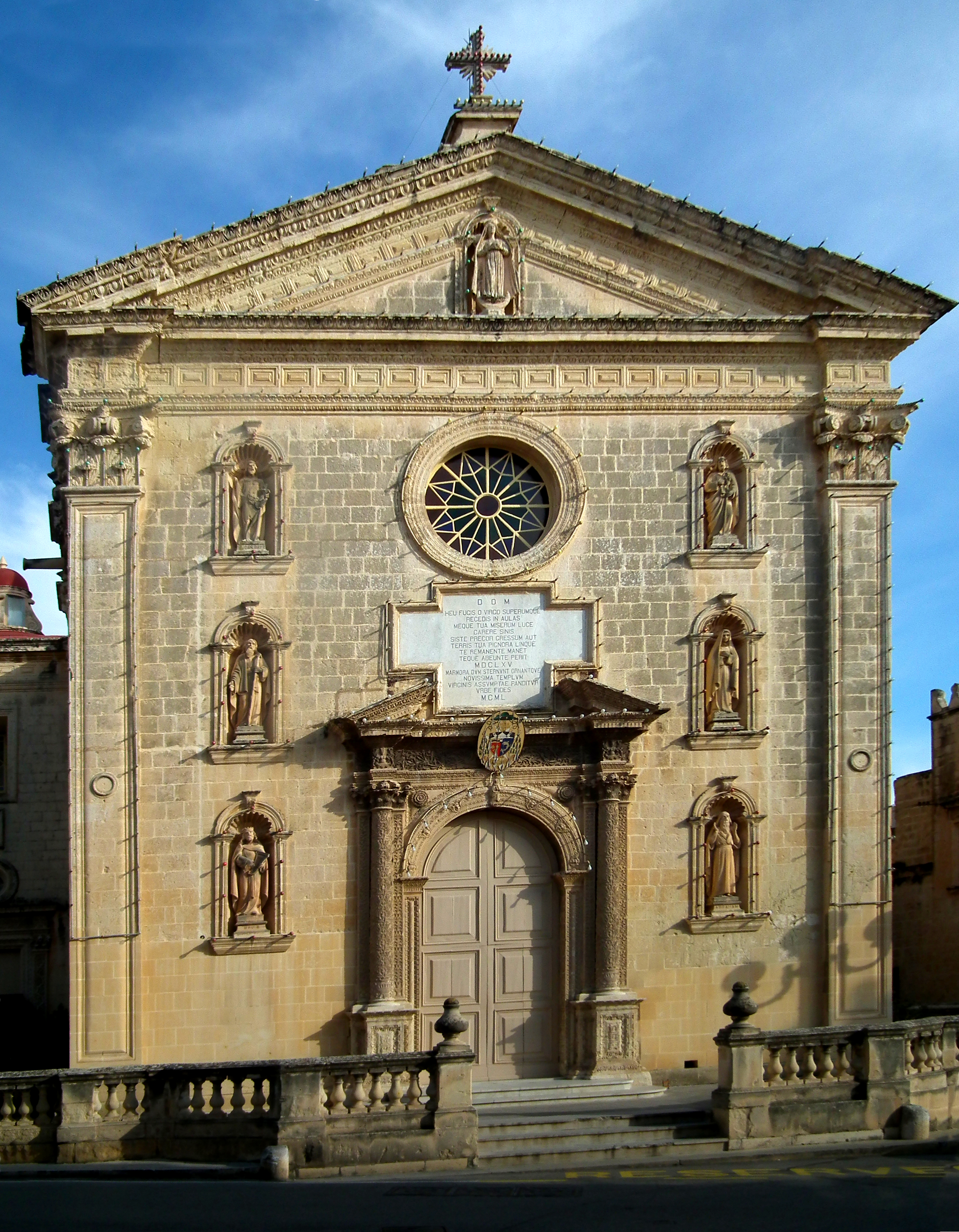
Attard worked as a stone carver at the Parish Church of St. Mary with Tommaso Dingli

Giovanni Attard (c. 1570–1636) was a Maltese architect, military engineer and stone carver from the town of Lija. He is mostly known for his role in the construction of the Wignacourt Aqueduct between 1610 and 1615.

In 1609–10, he worked as a stone carver at the church of the Madonna tal-Għar and the adjoining Dominican priory at Rabat, along with stonemason Giuseppe Barbara.

Attard was one of the capimastri (master builders) involved in the construction of the Wignacourt Aqueduct. In 1612, Bolognese engineer Bontadino de Bontadini was appointed to take over the project when the Sicilian engineer Natale Tomasucci left Malta after being unable to solve the problem of how water would flow at points where the ground level dropped. Meanwhile, Attard proposed to construct stone arches along the depressions, and running the aqueduct through pipes in the arches. Bontadini adopted this idea, and the aqueduct was built within three years, being inaugurated on 21 April 1615.

Attard worked as a stone carver on the Parish Church of St. Mary at Attard with Tommaso Dingli in 1615. The following year, he was involved in the reconstruction of the church of the Madonna tal-Għar with Domenico Azzopardi.

Attard died in 1636 and was buried at the Lija parish church.
