= RoseVille =

Villa Roseville
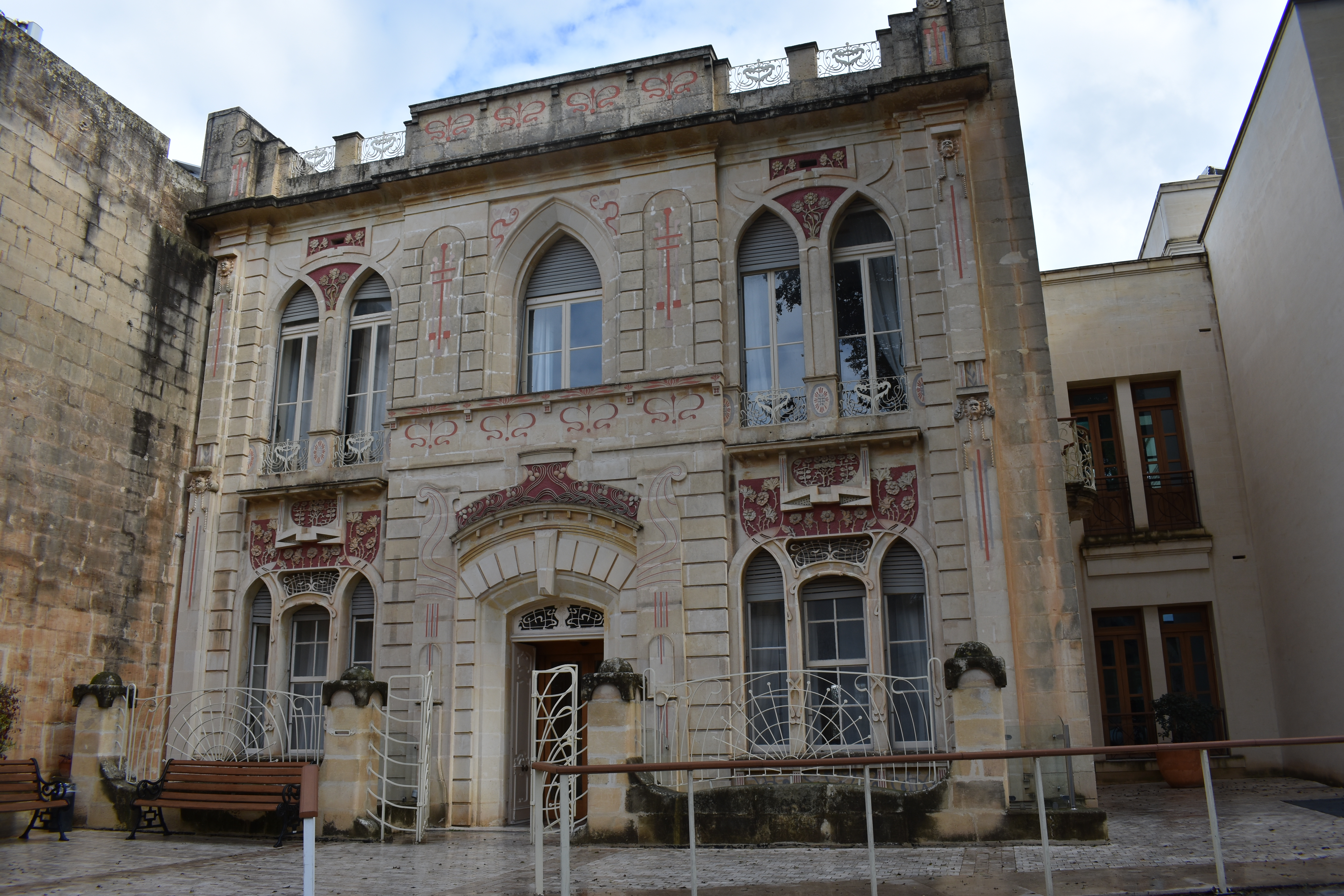
- The villa's polychrome façade
- Interactive map of the Villa Roseville area

General information
- Status: Intact
- Type: Villa
- Architectural style: Art Nouveau
- Location: Attard, Malta
- Coordinates: 35°53′39.1″N 14°26′41.8″E
- Current tenants: CareMalta
- Construction started: 1912
- Completed: 1921
- Client: Walter Briffa

Technical details
- Floor count: 2

Design and construction
- Architects: Alessandro Manara (ground floor); Emanuele Borg (first floor)

RoseVille or Villa Roseville is a villa in Attard, Malta. One of the few Art Nouveau buildings in the country, it was constructed in two stages in 1912 and 1921 as a summer residence. After years of abandonment, the building was converted into a nursing home for the elderly in 2010. Roseville is listed on the National Inventory of the Cultural Property of the Maltese Islands among the monuments in Attard.

== History ==
Villa Roseville was built as the summer residence of Dr. Walter Briffa. The ground floor was built in 1912 to designs of the Italian architect Alessandro Manara. The first floor was added nine years later in 1921, to designs of the Maltese architect Emanuele Borg. Although the floors were built years apart from each other by different architects, both phases of construction used the same Art Nouveau style.

Briffa's family lived in the house until the 1970s, and the building was briefly used as an examination centre for the Royal School of Music. Following the death of Briffa's unmarried daughters, the villa was abandoned and it fell into a state of dilapidation. Despite this, the building was scheduled, which gave it protection by law.

The building was eventually restored in 2009 in order to be converted into a nursing home for the elderly run by CareMalta. The home was inaugurated by Prime Minister Lawrence Gonzi on 4 June 2010.

The building is scheduled as a Grade 2 national monument, and it is listed on the National Inventory of the Cultural Property of the Maltese Islands.

== Architecture ==
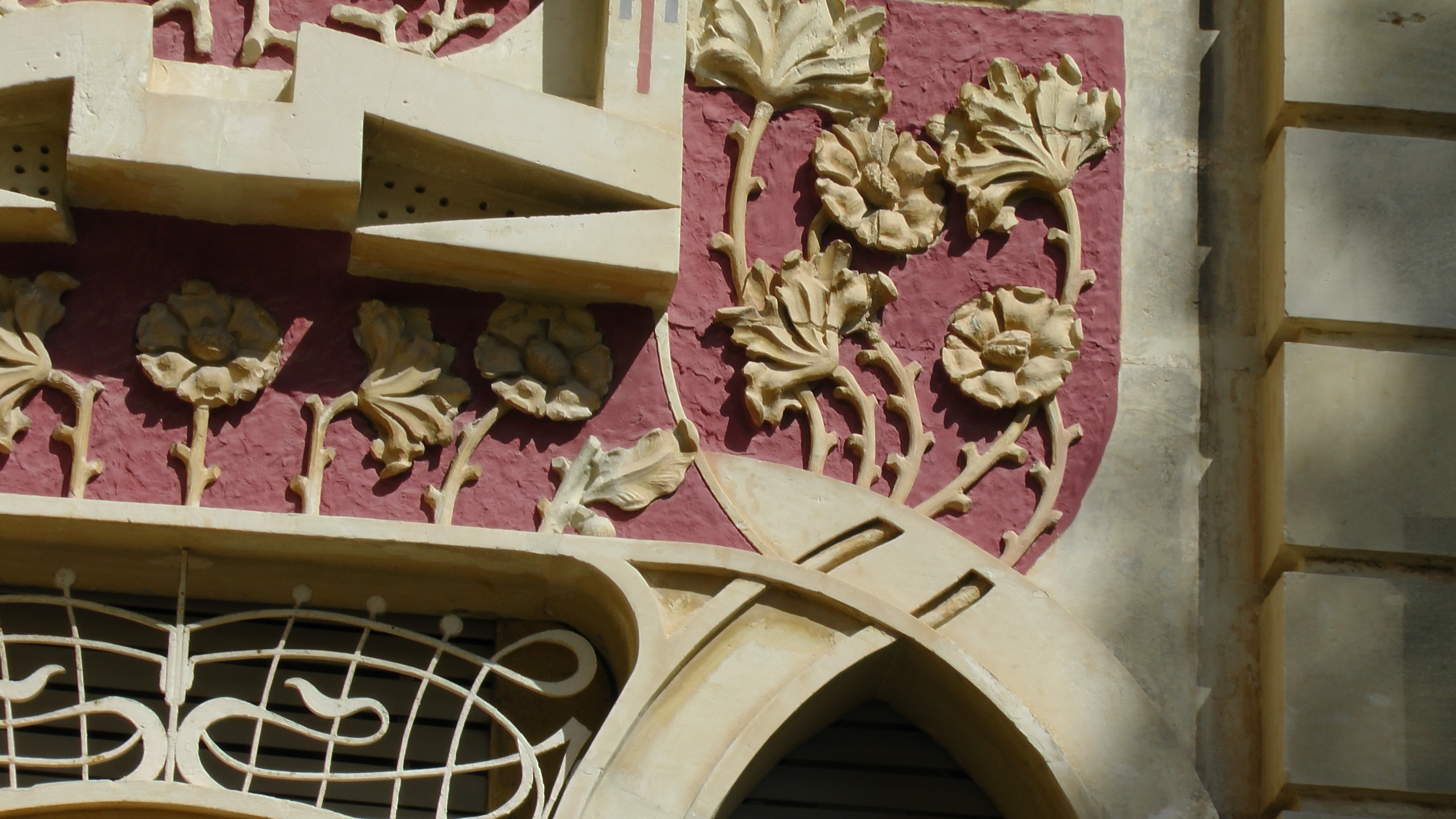
Floral detailing at Roseville

The Art Nouveau house consists of two floors, with a façade divided into three bays. The ground floor consists of an arched doorway flanked by an arched window on either side, and the first floor includes a pointed arched window above the door, which is again flanked by arched windows. The arched windows at ground floor level are subdivided into three elongated windows, and those at the first floor are divided into two.

Decorative floral motifs which echo French or North Italian Art Nouveau can be found in recessed panels above the windows. The recessed panels are painted in red and the motifs in other colours, making Roseville one of the few polychrome buildings in Malta. The house's interior includes Egyptian-style decoration which was fashionable at the time. Its boundary wall contains decorative ironwork.

Roseville is a unique building in Malta, and it is one of the few Art Nouveau buildings on the island. The house retains its original architectural fabric and decorations, as well as its fittings and fixtures. According to Mark G. Muscat,

"The importance of this villa lies in its singularity. It is probably the only complete building in Malta that encompasses Belgian, French and North Italian Art Nouveau influences. The forms used are evidently inspired by the designs of Victor Horta and by other buildings in Northern Italy and France. The fluid lines and wrought iron work are both remarkably expressive and reminiscent of buildings in Turin and Milan. The distinctive use of colour applied to the façade in the form of ornament vaguely recalls Otto Wagner's (1841-1918) polychromatic façades, as well as Raimondo D'Aronco's (1857-1932) designs for a rotunda which he conceived in 1902 for the First International Exposition of Modern Decorative Art in Turin. Details such as the wooden shuttering, which was patented and made in Germany, still bears the maker's mark 'C. Leins and Co. Stuttgart'. Roseville was definitely one of the first examples of architecture in Malta that may positively be classified as landmark, one of only a handful since the days of retardataire Maltese Baroque at its height. Even though it may not be as outstanding as other buildings of the time, its importance lies in its historical value and distinctive singularity.

== Alleged haunting ==
Prior to Roseville's restoration and conversion into a nursing home, the house was said to have been cursed or haunted. In the early 1930s, a young girl who lived in the house allegedly died of mysterious circumstances and her mother died within a year. The house was then reportedly sold to a person who died soon afterwards. After some relatives moved in some years later, the eldest son of the family died at war, and another child, the father and the mother died soon afterwards.
