= Parish Church of St Mary, Attard =

Parish Church of the Assumption of Mary
- Il-Knisja Parrokjali ta' Santa Marija
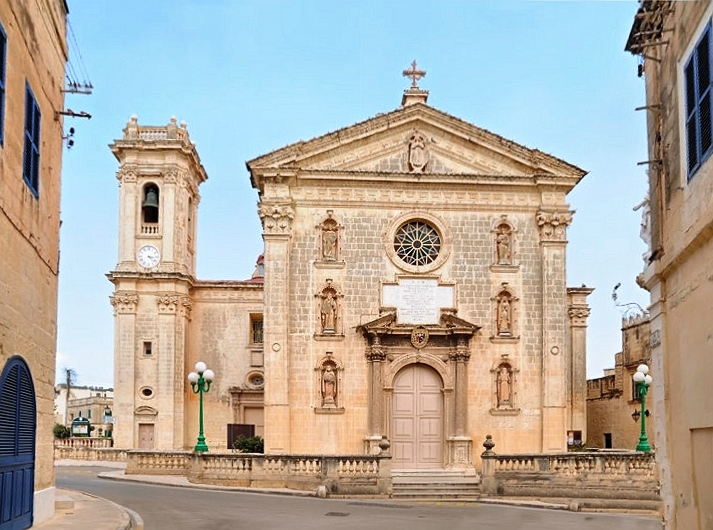
- Façade of the Parish Church of St. Mary
- Parish Church of the Assumption of Mary
- 35°53′27″N 14°26′36″E
- Location: Attard, Malta
- Denomination: Roman Catholic
- Website: attard-parish.org

History
- Status: Parish church
- Dedication: Assumption of Mary
- Dedicated: 7 May 1730

Architecture
- Functional status: Active
- Architect: Tommaso Dingli
- Style: Renaissance
- Years built: 1613–1624; 1718–1719 (belfry); 1740–1857 (sacristies)

Specifications
- Length: 31 m (102 ft)
- Width: 26.6 m (87 ft)
- Materials: Limestone

The Parish Church of Saint Mary (Maltese: Il-Knisja ta' Santa Marija) is a Roman Catholic parish church in Attard, Malta, dedicated to the Assumption of Mary. Built between 1613 and 1624, the church is attributed to the architect Tommaso Dingli and it is regarded as the finest Renaissance church in Malta. It still retains its original design, with the exception of a belfry and two sacristies which were added in the 18th and 19th centuries.

== History ==
The Parish Church of St. Mary was built between 1613 and 1624, and its design is attributed to the architect Tommaso Dingli. The sculptures within the church are the work of Dingli himself and Giovanni Attard.

Although Dingli had planned a belfry in the church, this was not built until 1718–19. It is sometimes attributed to the architect Giovanni Barbara, but there is no proof supporting this claim. The belfry has five bells, which were founded between 1713 and 1830. The clock on the belfry was made by Michelangelo Sapiano in 1872.

The church was dedicated on 7 May 1730. The sacristy was built in 1740, and its ceiling was decorated by master builder Karm Debono in 1902. Another sacristy was built between 1856 and 1857 under the direction of master builder Mikiel Mamo. This is now used as a crying room.

The church's parvis was first built in 1891, but it was damaged during World War II and was rebuilt in 1958.

The church is scheduled as a Grade 1 national monument, and it is also listed on the National Inventory of the Cultural Property of the Maltese Islands.

== Architecture ==
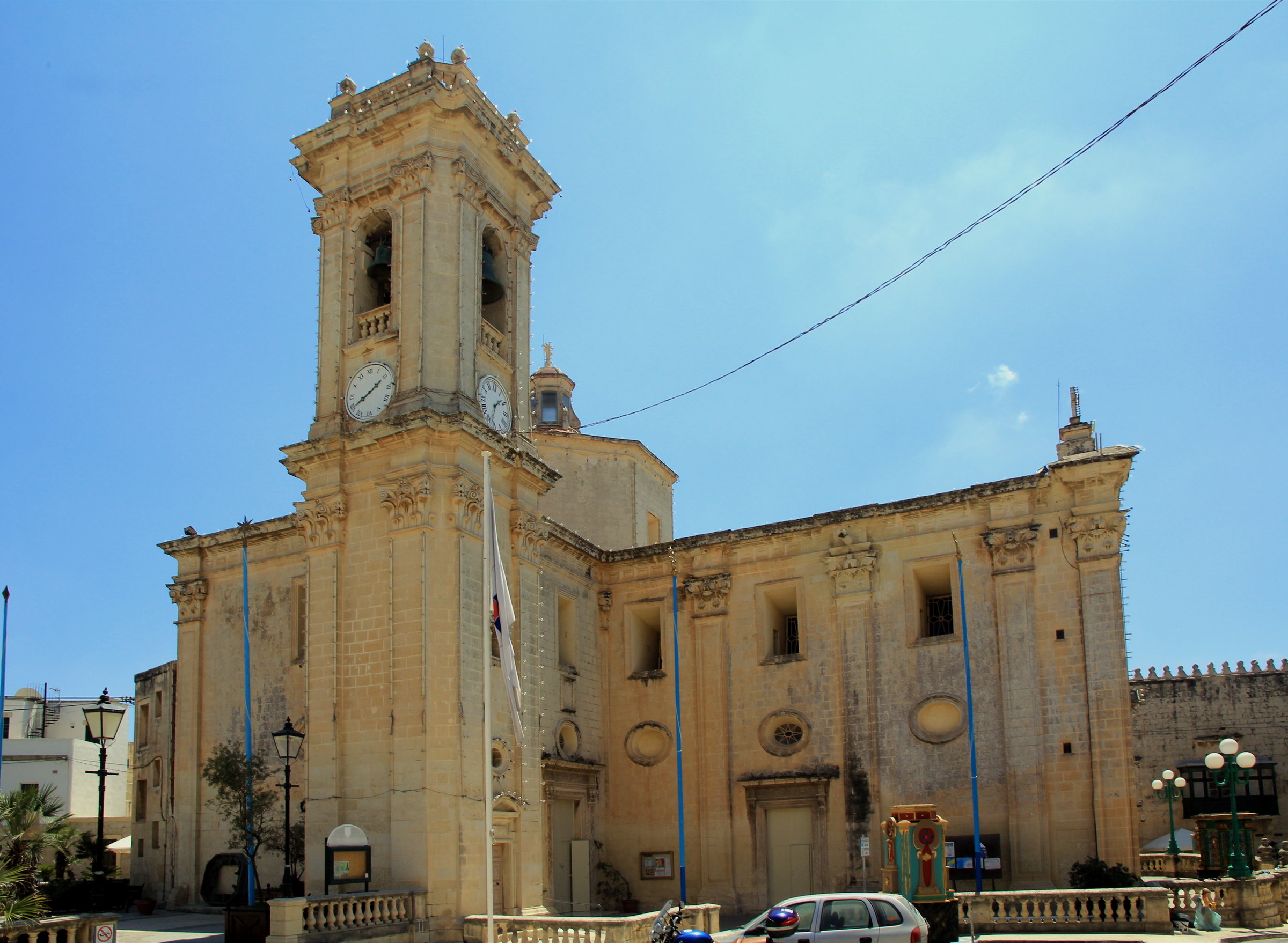
The church and its belfry as viewed from the side

The Parish Church of St. Mary is an example of Renaissance architecture, and it is regarded as the finest Renaissance church in Malta. It is attributed to the architect and sculptor Tommaso Dingli, and it is believed to be one of only two surviving churches which retain Dingli's original design, the other one being the old Parish Church of St. Mary in Birkirkara.

The church's façade is framed by Corinthian pilasters, and it is topped by a triangular pediment. The main doorway is located in the centre of the façade, and the stonework around the portal and the capitals is very ornate, probably being influenced by the Spanish Plateresque style. Six niches containing statues of saints or Biblical figures decorate the façade, three on either side of the main doorway. The statues were sculpted by Francesco Saverio Sciortino in 1945.

The church has a cruciform plan, with a dome and a belfry. It has a choir, two side chapels, a central aisle, two sacristies and ten altars. The ceiling of the aisle and the choir is decorated with frescoes.

== See also ==
- Culture of Malta
- History of Malta
- List of churches in Malta
- Religion in Malta
