= Tommaso Dingli =

Maltese architect and sculptor (1591–1666)

- Tumas Dingli
- Born: 22 December 1591; Attard, Malta
- Died: 28 January 1666 (aged 74)
- Resting place: Parish Church of St. Mary, Attard
- Occupation: Architect
- Notable work: Several parish churches, including those of Attard and Birkirkara
- Style: Renaissance
- Spouse: Argenta Dingli
- Children: 6
- Parents: Giacobo Dingli (father); Katerina Dingli née Tabone (mother)
- Relatives: Filippo Dingli (brother)

Tommaso Dingli (Maltese: Tumas Dingli, 22 December 1591 – 28 January 1666) was a Maltese architect and sculptor. One of the last Renaissance architects on the island, he designed several parish churches, most notably those of Attard and Birkirkara.

== Biography ==
Tommaso Dingli was born on 22 December 1591 in Attard, the son of the sculptor Giacobo Dingli and his wife Katerina Dingli née Tabone. He was the fourth of ten children, and one of his brothers was the artist Filippo Dingli. Dingli began his career as a scarpellino (stone carver) with his father Giacobo and his uncle, the engineer Andrea Dingli.

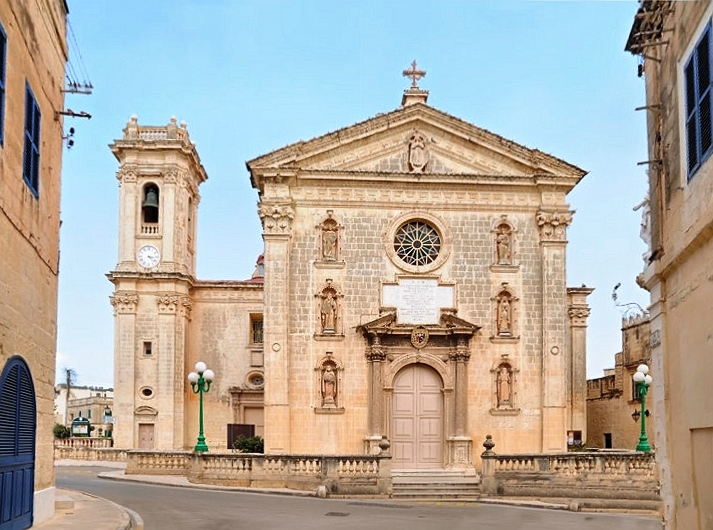
Parish Church of St. Mary in Attard

In his early career as an architect, Dingli assisted the capomastro (master builder) Giovanni Attard during the construction of the Wignacourt Aqueduct between 1610 and 1614. In later years, Dingli obtained a number of commissions and he designed a number of parish churches. In 1633, Dingli is attributed to have designed the second Porta Reale, the main city gate of the capital Valletta.

In 1639, Giovanni de’ Medici was impressed with Dingli's abilities and offered to take him to Italy, but he declined since his service was in demand within Malta. Dingli died on 28 January 1666 at the age of 74, and he was buried at the Attard parish church, which he had designed himself.

Most of Dingli's churches were built in the Renaissance style, and they might have had influences from the Spanish Plateresque. He was one of the last Renaissance architects in Malta, and the Baroque style became popular in the years after his death.

== Buildings attributed to Dingli ==
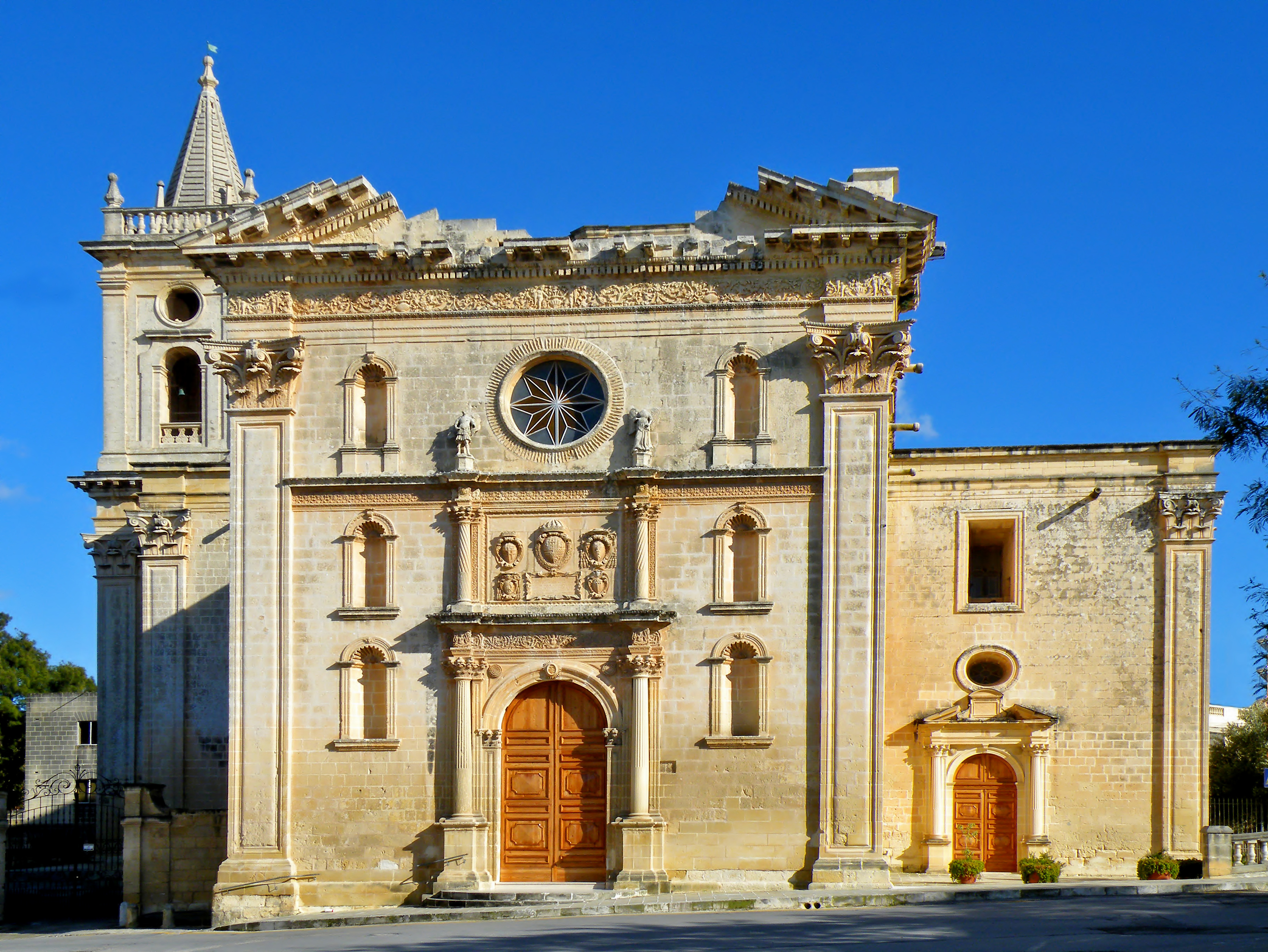
Parish Church of St. Mary in Birkirkara, which was designed (at least in part) by Dingli

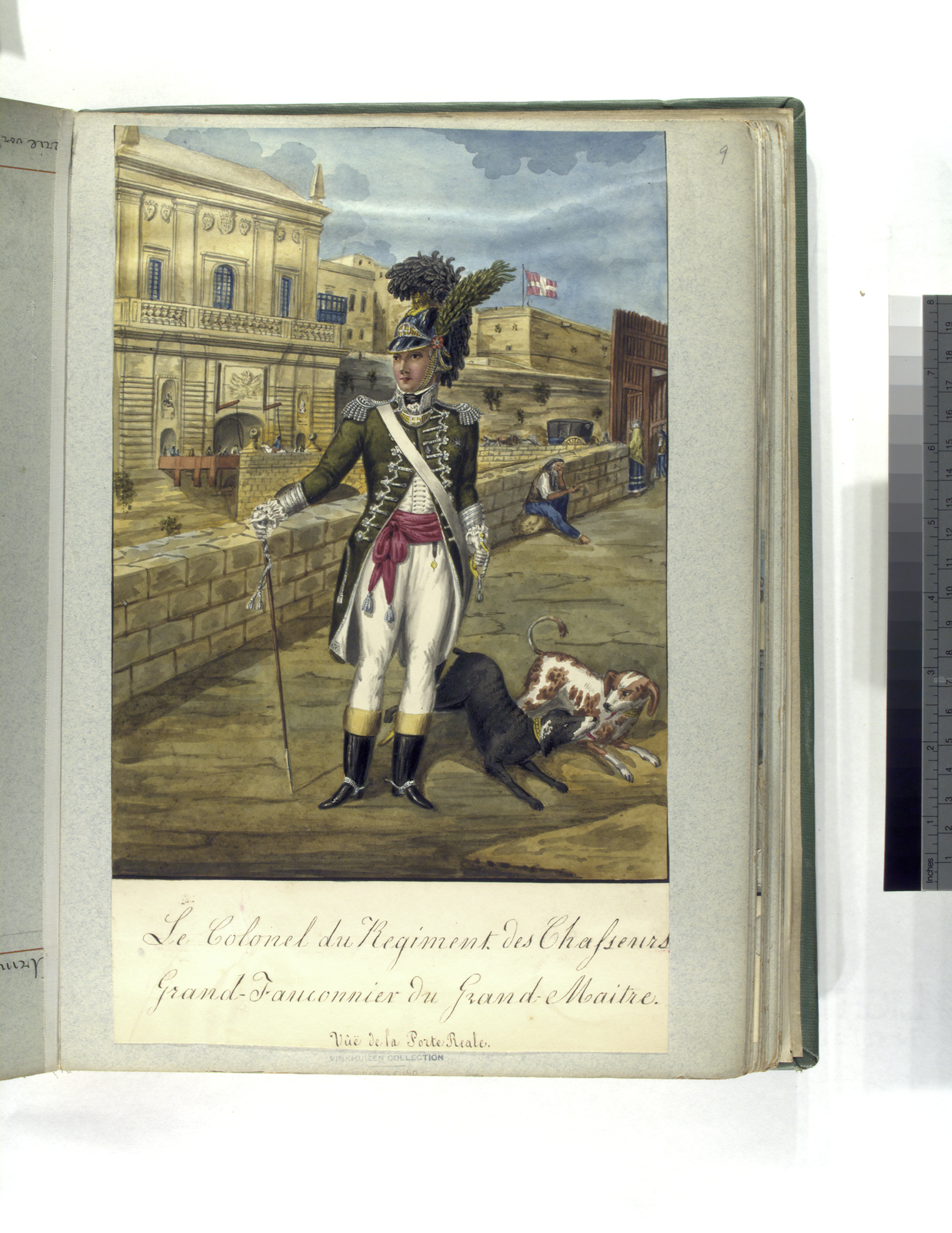
The second Porta Reale of Valletta, which is often attributed to Dingli, as seen in the background of an 18th century painting of a Hospitaller colonel

Dingli is best known for his ecclesiastical architecture. Churches which are known to have been designed by him include:

- Parish Church of St. Mary in Birkirkara – probably in collaboration with other architects
- Parish Church of the Assumption in Mosta
- Parish Church of St. Mary in Attard
- Parish Church of the Nativity of Mary in Naxxar
- Parish Church of St. Bartholomew in Għargħur
- Parish Church of Our Lady of Graces in Żabbar
- Parish Church of St. Philip of Agira in Żebbuġ – in collaboration with other architects
- Church of the Madonna tal-Għar at Rabat
- Sacristy of St. Paul's Cathedral in Mdina

Most of these were altered or destroyed in subsequent centuries, for example the Mosta parish church was demolished in the 19th century to make way for the Rotunda of Mosta. Only the Birkirkara and Attard parish churches still retain Dingli's original design.

Other buildings attributed to Dingli include the Bishop's Palace and the second Porta Reale, both in Valletta. The latter was demolished in 1853.

== Personal life ==
Dingli married Argenta Dingli from Siġġiewi when he was 60 years old. They had six children, one of whom became a priest.
