= Misraħ Kola =

Coordinates: 35.891°N 14.434°E

Misraħ Kola, (the Square of Nicholas) is an estate in the locality of Attard, Malta. It is considered part of Attard, though not strictly belonging to the three villages made up of (central) Attard, Balzan and Lija.

Up until the late 1900s, the Maltese railway passed by this estate and one can still see the old railway track at Triq il-Linja (Railway Street).

Here one finds the Attard Industrial Estate, the Misraħ Kola Garden, Pierre Muscat Garden and G.Zammit Garden.

== Main Streets in Misraħ Kola ==
- Triq A.Camilleri (A.Camilleri Street)
- Triq Ġwanni Pawlu II (John Paul II Street)
- Triq id-Dawwara (Circumference Street)
- Triq id-Dirsa (Thrashing Street)
- Triq id-Dorga (Picher Street)
- Triq il-Fies (Pickaxe Street)
- Triq il-Frawli (Strawberries Street)
- Triq il-Ġiebja (Cistern Street)
- Triq il-Linja (Railway Track Street)
- Triq il-Luħ (Shovel Street)
- Triq il-Luqqata (Distaff Street)
- Triq il-Midra (Pitchfork Street)
- Triq il-Minġel (Sickle Street)
- Triq il-Miżieb (Sprout Street)
- Triq il-Moħriet (Plough Street)
- Triq il-Qamħ (Wheat Street)
- Triq il-Qiegħa (Paviment Street)
- Triq in-Nebbieta (Germinationer Street)
- Triq is-Sienja (Bucket Wheel Street)
- Triq is-Sieqja (Waterchannel Street)
- Triq is-Sikka (Ploughshare Street)
- Triq ix-Xgħir (Barley Street)
- Triq iż-Żir (Pitcher Street)
- Triq L-Andar (Treshing Floor Street)
- Triq L-Għarix (Hut Street)
- Triq L-Istwiel (Spindle Street)
- Triq Spatafora (Spatafora Street)
