= Villa Bologna =

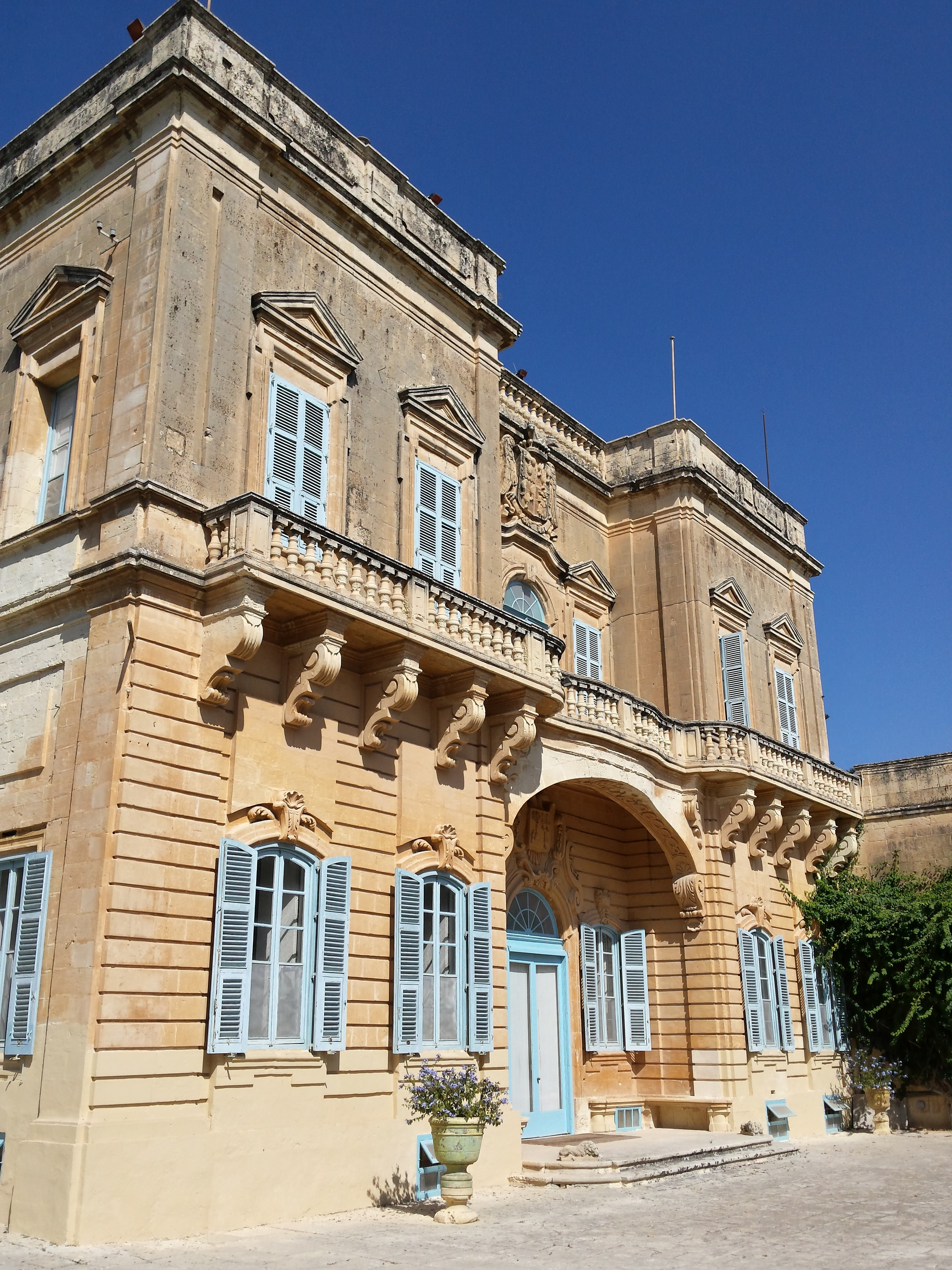
- View of Villa Bologna
- Interactive map of the Villa Bologna area
- Alternative names: Isbelma

General information
- Type: Stately home & Country Villa
- Architectural style: Baroque
- Location: Attard, Malta
- Coordinates: 35°53′39.8″N 14°26′40.1″E
- Current tenants: de Trafford family
- Construction started: 1745
- Completed: Unknown
- Renovated: Ongoing
- Client: Fabrizio Grech
- Owner: Jasper de Trafford

Technical details
- Material: Limestone
- Grounds: 3 hectares (7.4 acres)

Design and construction
- Designations: Grade I Scheduled National Monument

Renovating team
- Renovating firm: Architecture Project
- Awards: Prix d’Honneur in Category C of the Din l-Art Ħelwa award for Architectural Heritage 2013

Website
- www.villabologna.com

This article or section reads like an advertisement. To meet Wikipedia's quality standards and comply with Wikipedia's neutral point of view policy, it may require cleanup.

Villa Bologna is a Maltese stately home, in the village of Attard in the central district of Malta. Built in opulent Baroque style, Villa Bologna has been called "the most beautiful 18th century country house to be built for a Maltese family" and "of similar grandeur to the finest palaces on the island".

Villa Bologna is as interesting for its history as it is remarkable for its architecture and gardens which, after the neighbouring San Anton Gardens, is the largest historic gardens in Malta. Once the seat of the Counts della Catena, Villa Bologna is now held by the great-grandson of the 6th count Gerald Strickland, 1st Baron Strickland.

Built during the rule of the Order of St. John of Jerusalem and expanded during the British colonial period, Villa Bologna was central in the artistic, cultural, social and political history of Malta. It is a Grade 1 scheduled building and is a national monument.

== History ==
Villa Bologna was constructed, by Fabrizio Grech, in 1745 as a gift for his daughter Maria Teresa Grech on her marriage to Nicholas Perdicomati Bologna, later the 2nd Count della Catena. Fabrizio Grech was both sindaco of the Maltese Università and uditore, or advisor, to Grand Master Pinto. By virtue of these offices, especially of the latter one, Grech became an immensely wealthy and influential man. A story, much repeated but never substantiated, has it that he was provoked into building a residence of surpassing beauty and magnificence for his daughter by aspersions cast by his new in-laws on his social standing. This is unlikely. In the first place, the Perdicomati Bolognas were no family of ancient title; the first count was ennobled barely three months before his son married Maria Teresa Grech. Secondly, a man like Grech, whose influence over the Grand Master was such that the Grand Master had full trust in him, who was known for his overbearing manner and who commanded resources sufficient to build a mansion on the scale of Villa Bologna, was hardly likely to feel inferior to a count minted barely three months before the marriage alliance between their families. There is also some evidence to indicate that Grech and his daughter's father-in-law were very close associates indeed. Whatever the case may be, Nicholas Perdicomati Bologna and Maria Teresa Grech were married on 25 April 1745 and they were given this "fabulous villa" as a wedding present. Nicholas was succeeded by his daughter Maria Giovanna Perdicomati Bologna (the 3rd Countess) and, later, by his youngest daughter Angela Perdicomati Bologna (the 4th Countess). Angela married Baron Sciberras and the title, together with entail and the Villa passed on to their son Nicholas Sciberras Bologna in 1798. After the death without issue of Nicholas Sciberras Bologna, 5th Count della Catena, in 1875, protracted litigation between the putative heirs of the 5th Count was resolved in 1882 when the Judicial Committee of the Privy Council awarded the title and lands, including Villa Bologna to Gerald Strickland, the great-grandson of Angela Perdicomati Bologna and her husband Baron Sciberras.

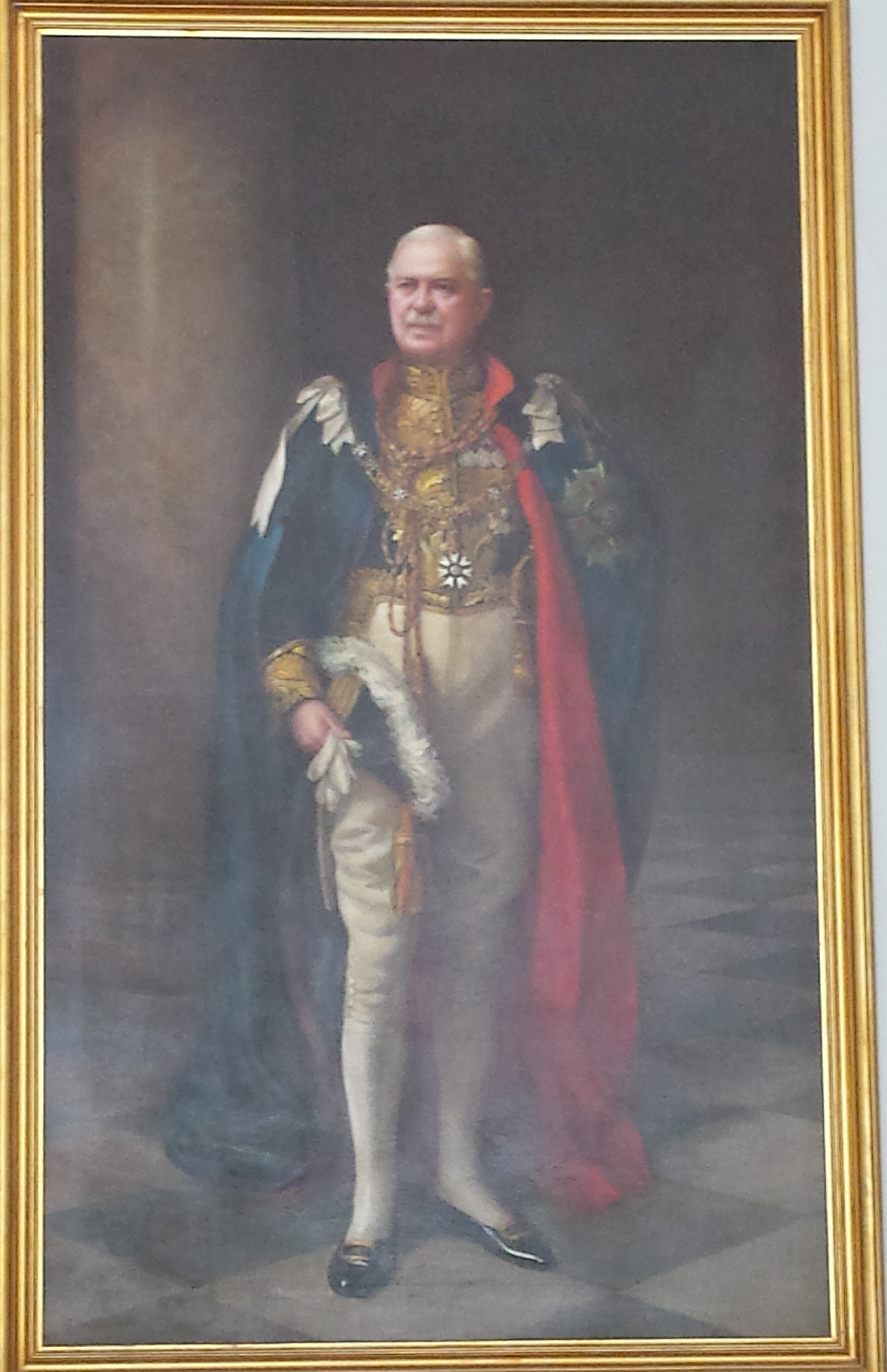
Portrait of Gerald Strickland, 6th Count della Catena, 1st Baron Strickland of Sizergh, by Edward Caruana Dingli. The portrait is in the main hall of Villa Bologna, Attard, Malta.

Gerald Strickland, now Gerald Bologna Strickland 6th Count della Catena, later also raised to the peerage of the United Kingdom as Baron Strickland of Sizergh, was to usher in a new age for Villa Bologna. The 6th Count, more usually known as Lord Strickland, was probably the most politically influential native of Malta in its history. The son of Walter Strickland, a British naval officer of a family of landholding gentry descended in part from the Plantagenet and Norman kings through Edward III, Lord Strickland had a spectacular political career and held many political offices in both Malta and around the British Empire. At one point he even held simultaneously the office of Leader of the Opposition in Malta as well as that of Conservative MP for Lancaster in the UK's House of Commons. Later he was elected Head of Ministry (office equivalent to that of Prime Minister) of Malta as well. By that time, he had resigned his seat from the British House of Commons to take up a seat in the House of Lords upon his elevation to the peerage as Baron Strickland of Sizergh. He was also appointed governor of a number of British colonies, the only colonial ever to hold such an office. Such was the stature of the man that he was acclaimed as "Pater Patriae" (Father of his Fatherland/Father of his Country) by the people of Malta, a title harking back to Republican and Imperial Rome and one of great resonance in the Latin culture of Malta. Lord Strickland also made two highly advantageous marriages. In 1890, Lord Strickland married Lady Edeline Sackville-West, the daughter of the 7th Earl de la Warr. Lady Edeline gave him eight children, including the Hon. Mary Constance Strickland, the Hon. Cecilia Victoria Strickland and the Hon. Mabel Edeline Strickland. Of the two boys born to Lord Strickland, neither survived infancy. During these years, Lord Strickland held numerous governorships of British colonies around the British Empire and, while the family was absent from Villa Bologna, he generously allowed an order of religious nuns to occupy the villa until the family should return to Malta. Lady Edeline died in 1918. In 1926, Lord Strickland married Margaret Hulton, daughter of the newspaper magnate Edward Hulton. It was Lady Strickland who was to modernise Villa Bologna and, together with her friend Count Giuseppe Teuma Castelletti, she extended the gardens far beyond their original limits, raised the walls of the property and decorated them with crenels. She added turrets, planted hundreds of trees and many exotic species, and laid out fountains and ponds of unique character and beauty. If Fabrizio Grech had built a fabulous villa, it was Lady Strickland who was to transform it into a horticultural paradise.

In 1940, Lord Strickland died and, for the first time since its construction, the ownership of Villa Bologna was estranged from the Catena title. The title passed on to the son of Lord Strickland's eldest daughter, the Hon. Mary Constance Horneyold Strickland while Villa Bologna passed on to Gerald Edmund Hubert de Trafford(1929-2015), the eldest son of the Hon. Cecilia Victoria Strickland and her husband Captain Hubert de Trafford. In 1971, Gerald married Helena Catherina Charlotte Hallo (b. 1945) and they had two children – Dr Aloisia Cecilia Mary de Trafford (b. 1973) and Jasper Peter Paul Sybrand de Trafford (b. 1975).

After the death of Gerald in 2015, his son, Jasper, who had been managing the estate since 2009, inherited Villa Bologna and is now the current holder of the Villa, the seventh of his line to hold it. Jasper married Fleur Cecilia Kate de Trafford (b. 1978) and they had two sons, Cosmo Benedict Randolphus (b. 2011) and Montague Francis Humphrey (b. 2013).

== Design ==
The architect of Villa Bologna is unknown but an attempt has been made to attribute this design to Domenico Cachia, capomastro della Fondazione Manoel. This is because the design of Selmun Palace, which is very similar in places to that of Villa Bologna, too has been attributed to Cachia. However, this attribution is unproven and tentative at best. Current research indicates that Andrea Belli, who was an architect involved in the reconstruction of the Auberge de Castille between 1741 and 1744), may be responsible for Villa Bologna. This possibility may appear remote but a certain similarity between the Auberge de Castille and Villa Bologna, as well as the dates of Castille's reconstruction (1741-1744), just a year prior to the construction of Villa Bologna, support this hypothesis. Moreover, Andrea Belli's brother was a colleague of Fabrizio Grech and this same brother appears to have colluded substantially with Fabrizio Grech and the Perdicomati Bolognas in the Bologna-Testaferrata case. These close links between the principal characters of the story and Andrea Belli offer strong circumstantial evidence that Belli was, indeed, the architect of Villa Bologna. Confirmation, however, requires further research. Nonetheless, this evidence linking one of the most imposing, majestic and lavish palaces ever erected by the Knights of Malta with Villa Bologna gives some insight into the character of Fabrizio Grech. It also speaks volumes about the extent of his influence and his wealth.

The villa is constructed on a basic quadrilateral plan, the footprint of which is approximately 440 metres^{2}. Nonetheless, there are numerous wings and extensions to the main building, some of which even antedate the main building itself. These include an older villa, an old farmhouse and a side-wing stretching from the south-west corner of the main villa to the Nymphaeum. There were an aviary and a mill room on one side of this fountain and an aviary and a tower on the other side. Another extension along the west façade was constructed by Lady Strickland. This is a mezzanine that allowed for the extension of the main dining room and the addition of some staff accommodation. The villa is built in the Baroque style, with some discernible Neo-Classical influences here and there.

=== Exterior ===
The front (east) façade is a triumph of Mediterranean Baroque architecture, featuring elaborate expressions of the Baroque idiom and including a large balcony that runs along the entire length of the front façade. The idiom is grandiloquent but the proportions are so excellent that the viewer is not overwhelmed by the monumental size of the villa. The south façade is also in the Baroque style but is much more subdued. There are no sculpted façades on the west and north sides. One element of note is that the windows on the upper storey are Neo-Classical in style, an apparent anomaly on a building so otherwise resolutely Baroque. This may be due to the changing fashions of the years in which the villa was built. A mezzanine was added along the west façade by Lady Strickland in the 1920s. The style of this mezzanine is classical and very different from the rest of the villa since it was designed to blend with the New Garden rather than with the Villa. This side does have the addition of mullioned windows graced by extraordinarily beautiful stained glass bearing the heraldic devices of the Bologna and the Strickland families. The stained glass was damaged during the war when a bomb fell in the grounds of the Villa and it was repaired in Florence after the war. To the right of the large Nymphaeum is a building called the Pavilion that served as the workshop where Lord Strickland, a keen amateur carpenter and engineer, practised his favourite hobbies. The Pavilion was originally an aviary and mill room and it was the mill room that came to serve as a workshop for Lord Strickland. The aviary was converted into accommodation in the 1970s. A 16th-century villa which is now a wing of the main building runs along the north façade from the Dolphin Garden to the wall overlooking the street. In all, the area of the entire building may run to twice the size of the main Villa.

=== Interior ===
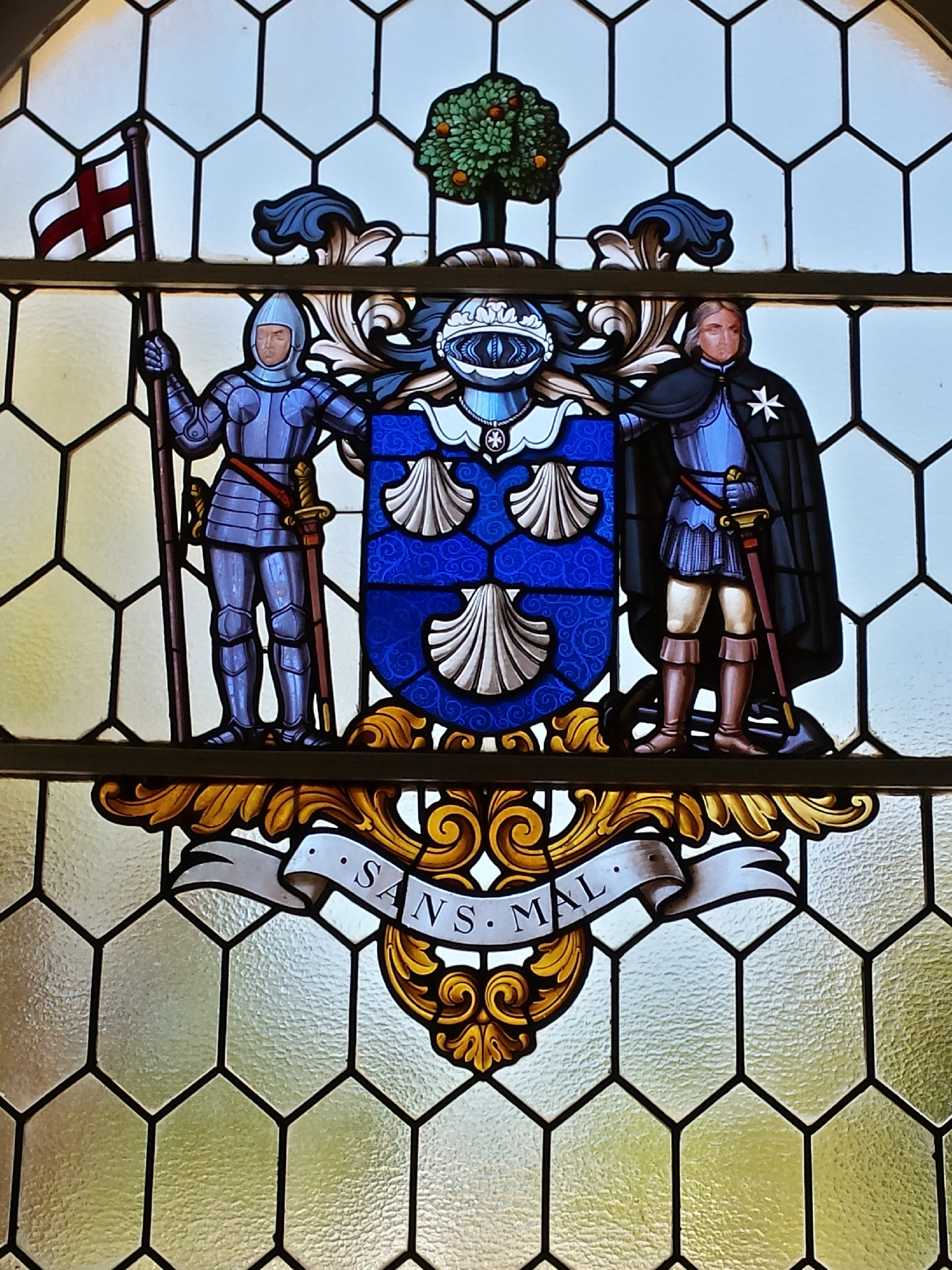
Stained Glass window bearing the Strickland coat of arms in the dining room extension at Villa Bologna

The main door of the villa opens onto a great hall with rooms at each of the four corners. These are the sitting room, the study, the Pink Room and the dining room, which was extended by Lady Strickland beyond the original width of the west façade. At the far end of this dining room are the mullioned windows with the stained glass bearing the coats of arms of the Bologna and the Strickland families. In these windows are set two doors leading out into the New Garden. To the north of the dining room lies the kitchen. Up a stately staircase, there is a ballroom. This floor is built on the same plan as the ground floor and around the ballroom are four large bedrooms. One of these served as Lord Strickland's bedroom and has a large dressing room and a marble bathroom that were added on by him in the 1920s. The west side of the villa has now been divided into apartments. These once housed the serving staff. This wing predates the main villa and the decor of these rooms is far more subdued than those of the rest of the villa.

== Shelter ==
In 1942, at the height of World War II, when the bombing of Malta was at its most intense, it was felt necessary to put in a shelter under the house. In fact, the shelter that was eventually constructed is one of the largest private shelters in Malta. The entrance was through the cellar of the main house and this too was adorned with stairs of marble. This staircase led down into the principal room of the shelter that had once served as the villa's main well at the time of the original construction. At the time that the shelter was dug out, this main room served to store the boilers that provided the villa's central heating and it also included a shaft for coal. The shelter has numerous rooms and an area serving as an infirmary or delivery room. This room has plastered walls and a tiled floor. It was also equipped with electricity. This shelter was no idle precaution. The villa is very close to Ta’ Qali where the military airport for the defence of Malta during World II was located. The villa itself was bombed and a German pilot parachuted into the garden after he bailed out of his burning aircraft. The shelter is open to the public and access is through a spiral staircase that was originally the shelter's emergency exit.

== Garden ==
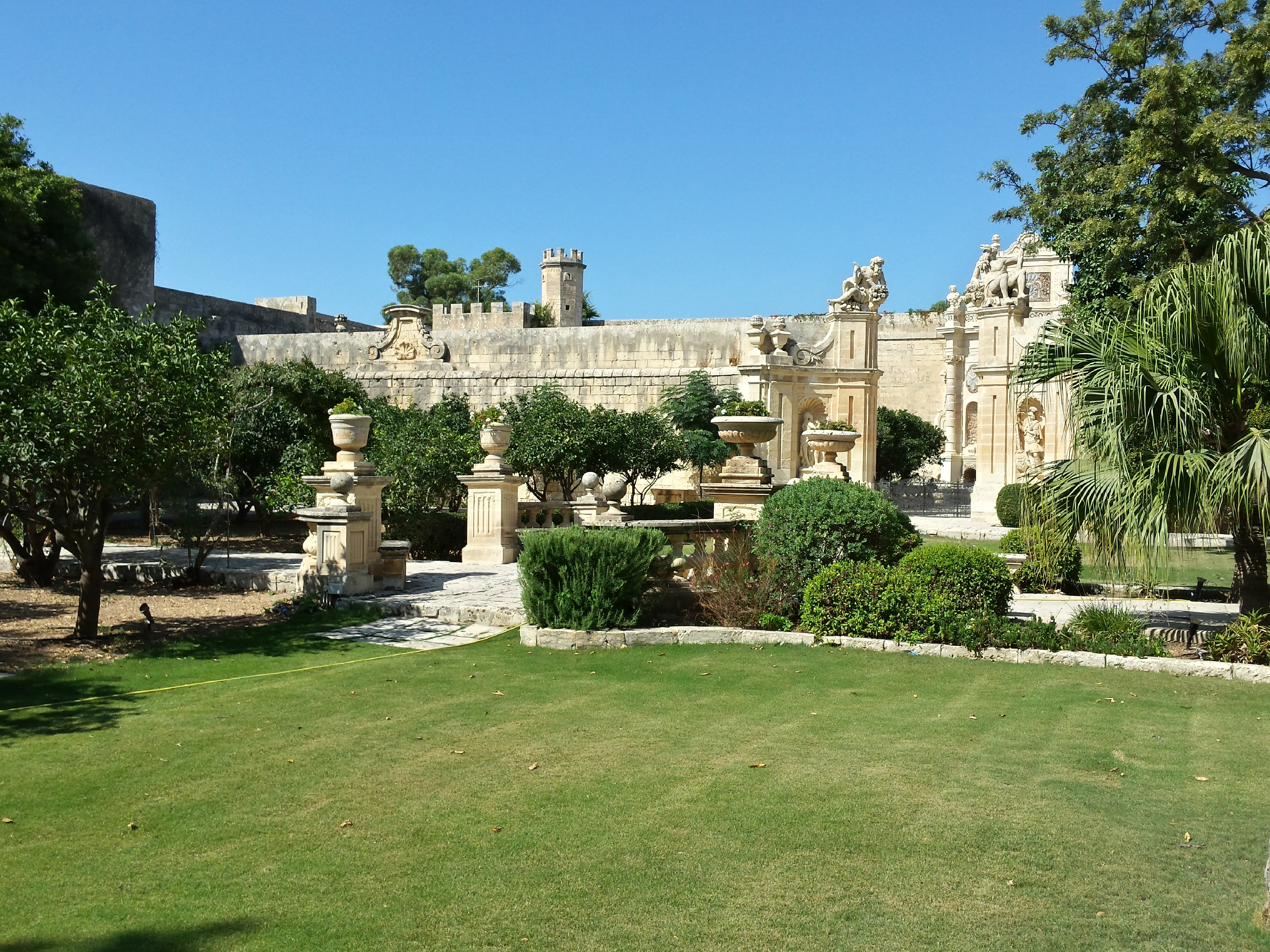
The Baroque Garden of Villa Bologna was laid down at the time of the original construction of the villa in 1745.

Villa Bologna is a palatial country house typical of the Mediterranean Baroque. Though regally splendid in its own right, it is through its gardens that it acquires a character that is absolutely unique in the annals of Maltese architecture. The gardens of Villa Bologna were laid out in two phases. The original garden, better known as the Baroque Garden, dates back to the original construction in 1745. This garden was laid out in the traditional style with a symmetrical layout and citrus trees throughout. Later on, lawns were added and exotic trees were planted. This garden is remarkable for its nymphaea, one large and one small, the larger of which is said to be one of the best examples of the use of rocaille in Malta. To the east of the larger Nymphaeum is a Baroque gateway framing the larger Nymphaeum as one looks through it from the lawn. After his term as governor expired, Lord Strickland brought saplings back from Australia and planted the Grevillea and a couple of other Australian trees in the Baroque Garden. Lady Strickland continued this trend of adding interesting exotic species to the garden and the part of the orange orchard closest to the villa slowly became a minor arboretum in which the orange trees were replaced with large exotic trees (the Grevillea, Jacaranda, etc.) Some exotic trees were also planted around the border of this garden, including what is probably Malta's first and oldest avocado tree as well as a specimen of Pimenta dioica. As these trees matured, the citrus in that area suffered. However, the shade provided created a pleasant area for entertaining so this part of the Baroque Garden was adorned with Maltese paving stones. In the 1950s, the garden was further modified and two lawns were put down in the centre of the garden with a row of balustrades separating the paved area from the lawn. Despite these modifications this part of the garden retains its Baroque character and is dominated by the Baroque statuary and Nympahaea.

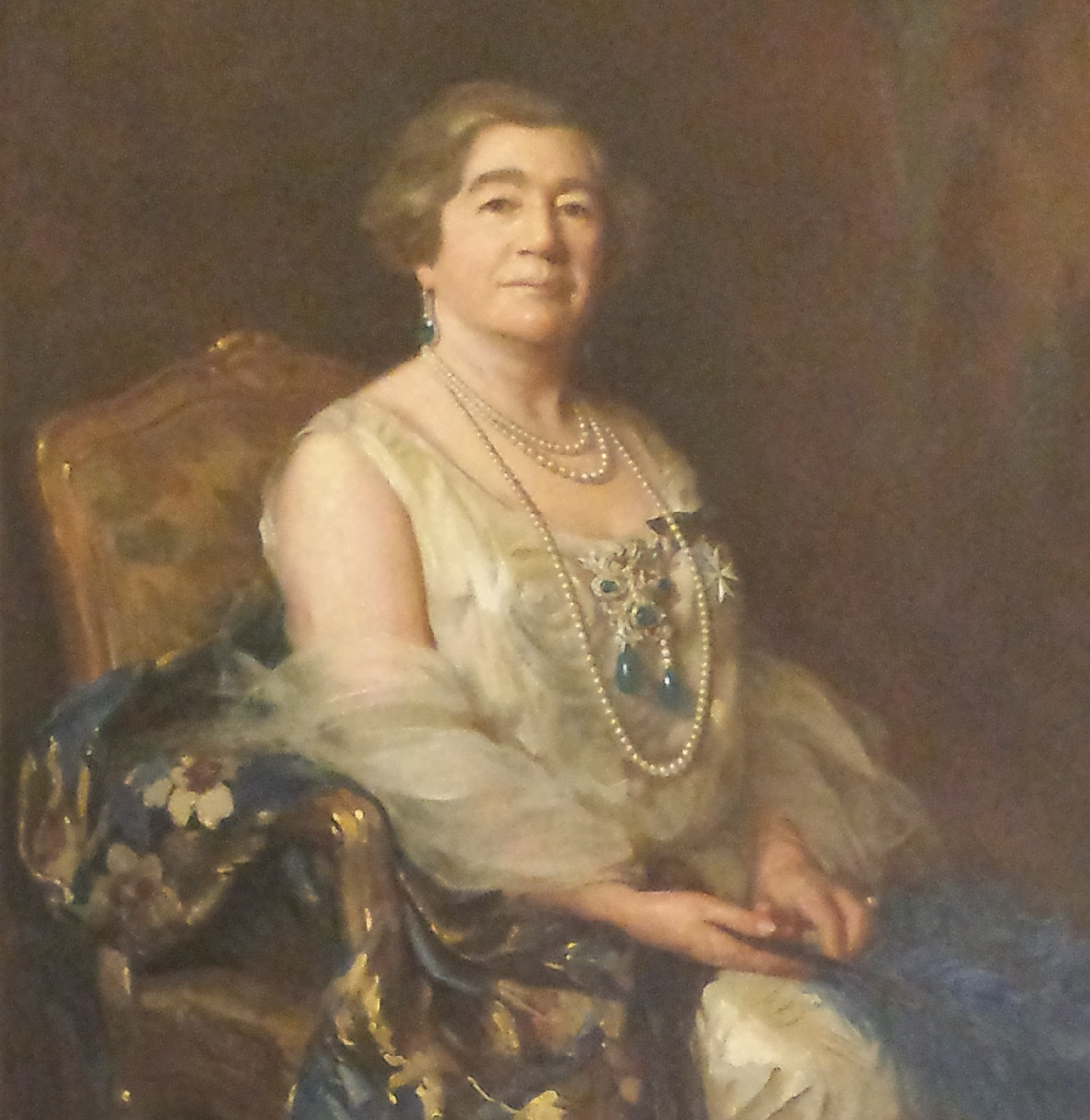
This portrait of Lady Strickland, by Edward Caruana Dingli, is in the dining room at Villa Bologna

The New Garden was laid out by Lady Strickland after she married Lord Strickland in 1926. An Englishwoman, Lady Strickland came from a culture that reveres gardens and, being extremely wealthy in her own right, she was able to indulge her passion for gardens by letting her imagination run loose on the grounds of Villa Bologna. Thus, assisted by her friend, Count Giuseppe Teuma Castelletti, she laid out large gardens along the western side of the villa. The New Garden was most likely inspired by Villa Frere and La Mortola in Italy. She greatly increased the acreage of the estate, bringing the total up to around 7.3 acres and she added a line of cypresses recalling the famous gardens of La Mortola on the Italian Riviera. Moreover, she planted Malta's first grapefruit and avocado trees, an exotic vegetable garden, including asparagus, and cherry trees as well as tangerines. Furthermore, she increased the height of the property's walls and adorned them with crenels as well as hexagonal towers. Among the trees she added are carob trees, Norfolk pines and palm trees. Perhaps the most spectacular additions she put in were the Dolphin Pond and the Sunken Pond, two ponds that, for beauty and character, have no equal in Malta. Finally, she installed a watering system of irrigation channels made of stone and supplied by an underwater reservoir.

Such was the scale of her work in the garden that in the 1930s she was employing 16 gardeners working full-time 10 hours a day, 6 days a week. The New Garden also contains a small cottage and a water tower.

=== Baroque Garden ===
The Baroque Garden is the old garden of the villa, laid out at the time of the construction of the villa in the 18th century. These gardens are typical of the Baroque in Italy at that time, with a symmetrical layout set around cobbled pavements with pillars bearing stone pots of all kinds. The garden was originally planted with all sorts of citrus trees, especially orange trees. Later on, especially during the days of Lord Strickland, lawns were added and exotic trees, including palm trees, as well as other types of fruit trees were planted. Flowering shrubs and creepers were likewise added to this garden. Of particular interest are the large Nymphaeum and the small one, as well as the Baroque Gateway that frames the large Nymphaeum as one looks through it towards the west.

=== The Nymphaeum ===
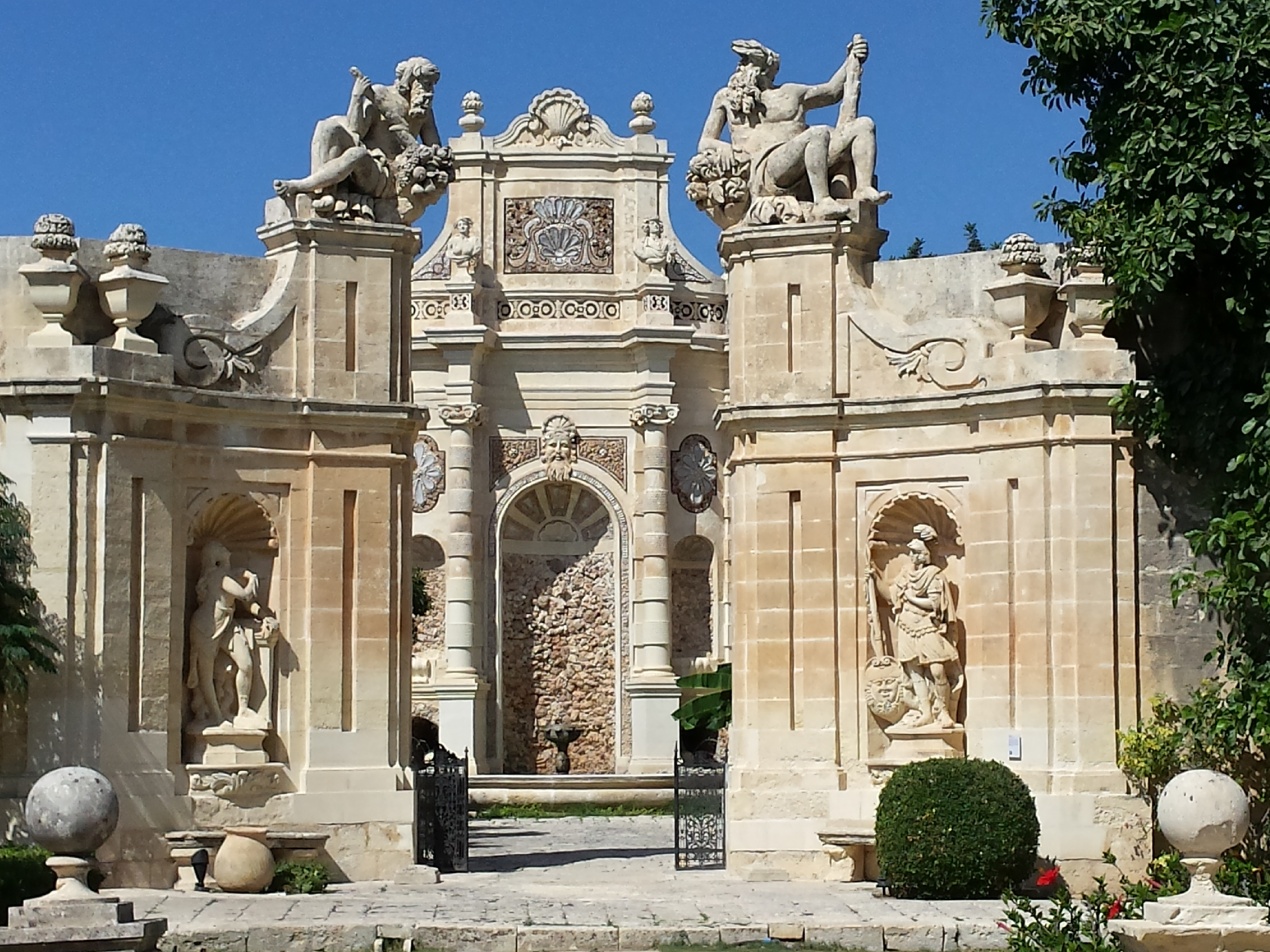
The Large Nymphaeum seen through the Baroque Gateway in the Baroque Garden

Two of the most outstanding features in the Baroque Garden are the larger Nymphaeum and the Baroque Gateway. The larger Nymphaeum is a fountain built in the 18th century in the Rococo style and is one of the best uses of rocaille in Malta. The rocaille of this Nymphaeum includes gagazza, coral-like material, and real seashells. Rusticated columns frame the niches and panels while figures drawn from Classical mythology, or personifications of nature, fill the fountain. There are also dolphins serving as waterspouts and Nereids serving as caryatids. On top of the fountain are busts of the four seasons. Over the fountain is a carving of the face of Neptune and the main panels contained statues of Bacchus and Pan. However, these two statues were damaged when they fell into the fountain and are currently awaiting restoration. All these figures are carved in the style of the Rococo. This Nymphaeum is in an enclosed garden beyond the Baroque Gateway in the Baroque Garden.

=== The Baroque Gateway ===
The Baroque Gateway is less complex but no less imposing. On the left side of the gate is a statue of Cleopatra over which is the reclined figure of the god of river Nile. On the other side of the gate is a statue of Mark Antony and above this statue is the reclined figure of the god of the river Tiber. The gateway, beautiful as it is, comes into its own when one looks through it towards the west, upon which it appears to frame the large Nymphaeum to ravishing effect.

=== Dolphin Pond ===
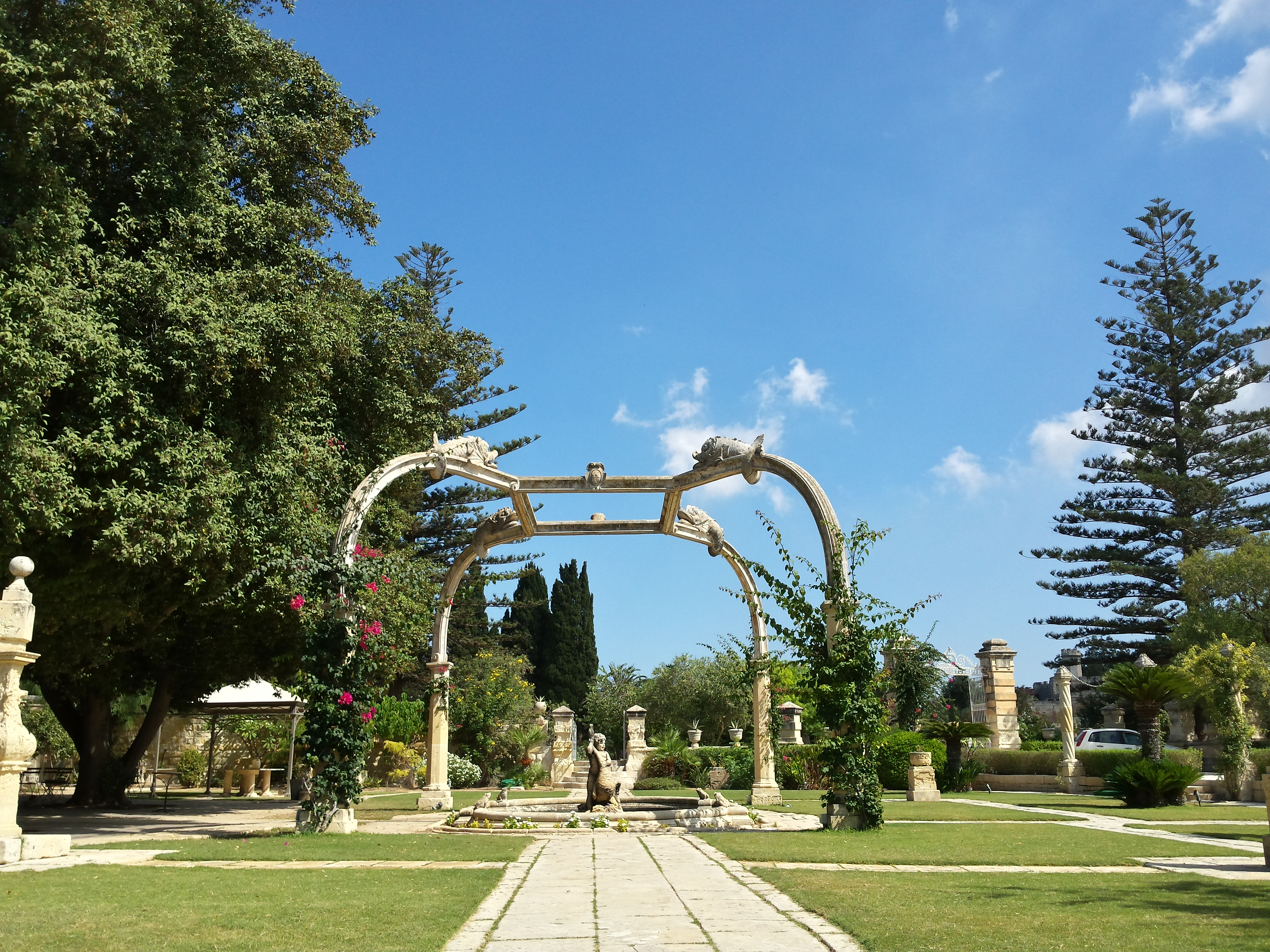
The Dolphin Pond in the New Garden at the back of Villa Bologna

One of the most visually alluring spaces in the New Garden is the Dolphin Pond. This is a pond in the middle of which is the statue of a boy embracing a swan from whose beak springs a fountain of water. In each corner of the pond, a toad spouts water into the pond. Soaring on columns around the pond are four arches meeting on the corners of a rectangle just above the pond. On each arch is a stone dolphin carved in the Baroque style. These dolphins once spouted water too but this feature is currently being restored. The pond is in the middle of a space divided into lawns separated by a cobbled pavement and surrounded by a hedge of salvia. Majestic palm trees once held sway across the lawn but were wiped out by the Red Palm Weevil (Rhynchophorus ferrugineus) which swept Malta between 2005 and 2010. However, since then, other palm trees have been planted to replace the ones lost to the Red Palm Weevil but they will take some years to reach maturity. One noteworthy feature of this area is its exceptional proportions. Such is the mathematical precision of these proportions that despite the size of this area, it does not appear to dwarf any element in it and it appears to be just right in size rather than excessive in any way.

=== The Sunken Pond ===
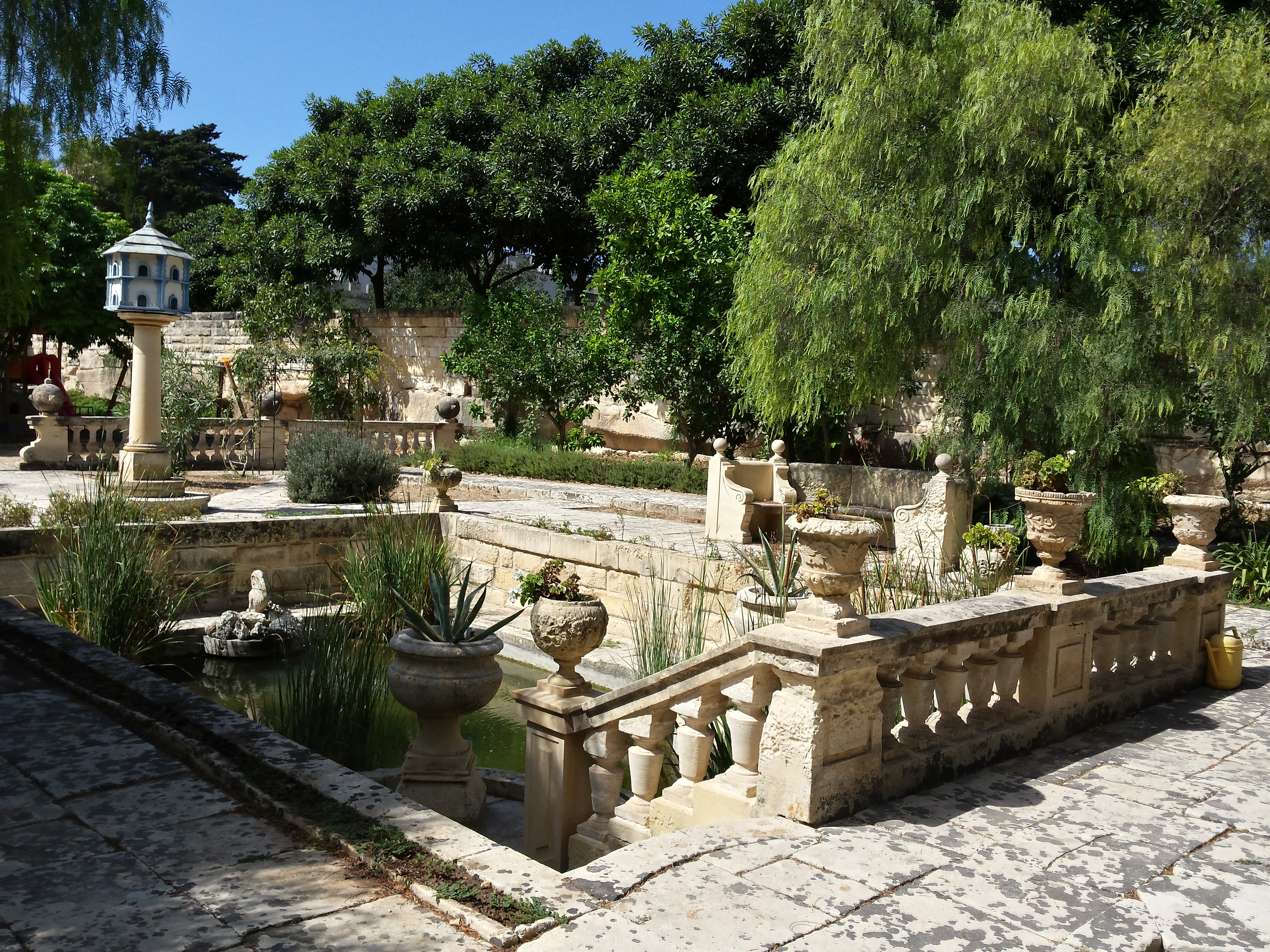
The Sunken Pond in the New Garden at Villa Bologna

Up a flight of stairs leading west from the Dolphin Pond is an area far smaller in size but just as attractive to visitors. Past the stairs and turning left through a pergola, one runs into a pond of unusual character. This is the Sunken Pond, so called because it is sunk deep into the limestone pavers. On the north side of the pond, there is a balustrade leading down to the pond by means of a flight of stairs both sides of the pond. There is a walkway around the pond on the same level. There are stone pots for cactus plants and other flora around the perimeter of the pond, and a stone pelican, which serves as a fountain, on the south side. Growing in the corners are water rushes. On the main level, flanking the pond, are two semi-circular stone benches shaded by false pepper (Schinus molle) trees. On the south side of the pond, there is a lofty dovecote which once housed a sizeable colony of pigeons. The small size of the Sunken Pond and the surrounding area, together with its unusual character, impart a feeling of intimacy and magic to this area such that it strikes the fancy of many visitors to the villa. In fact, it is extremely common for visitors to call the Sunken Pond their favourite part of the whole estate.

== Pottery ==
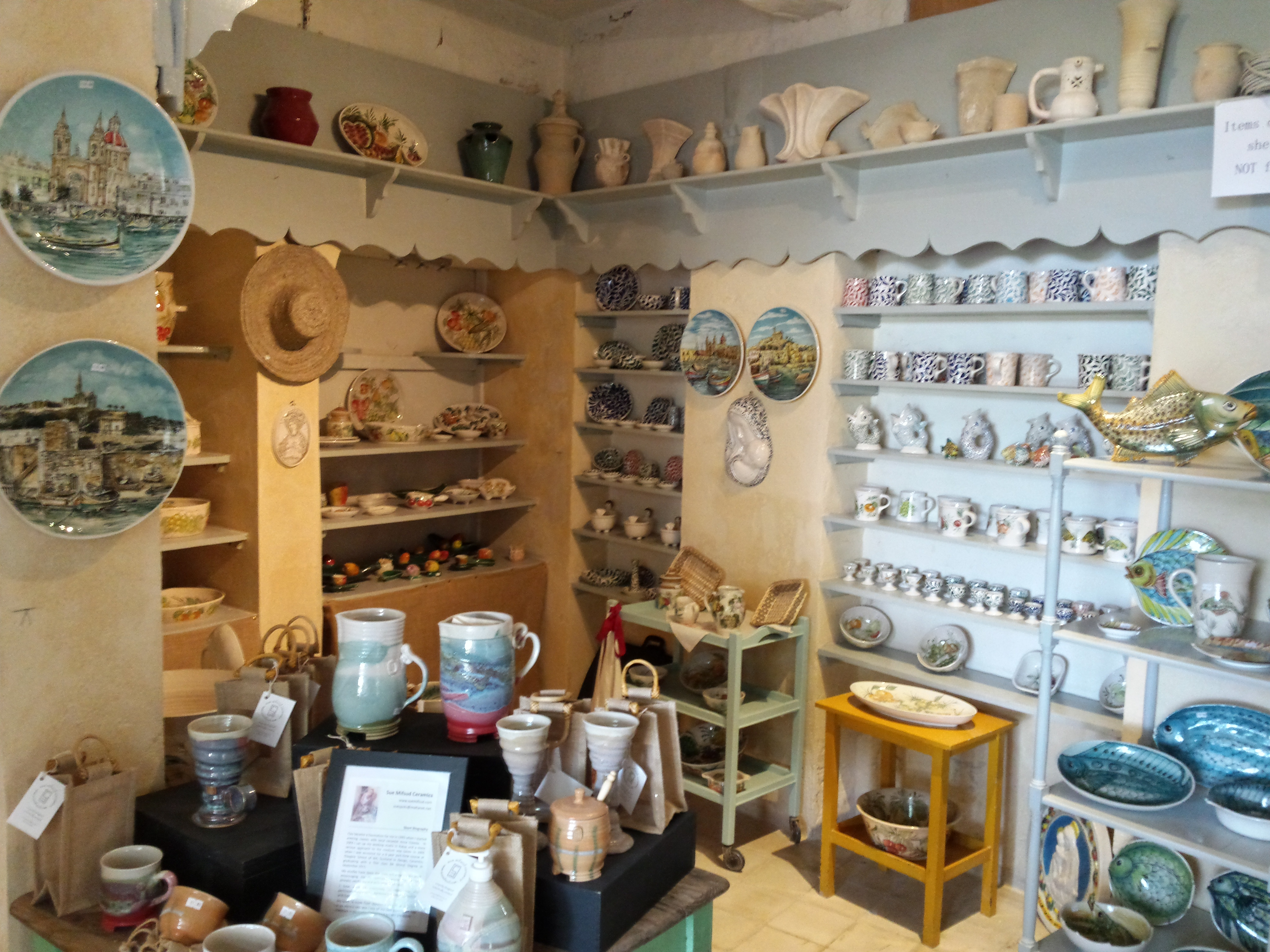
A full selection of the pottery's wares. The pottery was a leader in pioneering a native Maltese artistic style in the years after World War II.

At the far end of the estate were the old stables that the Hon. Cecilia de Trafford transformed into a pottery for the employment of local artists and the production of authentic Maltese potterware. The origin of the pottery harks back to a pottery run by family friend Count Giuseppe Teuma Castelletti before World War II. During the war, the Count stored his stock in the cellar at Villa Bologna, which was lucky indeed since his pottery, then at a now forgotten location at Ta’ Qali, was hit by a bomb. Then, in 1951, it occurred to Cecilia, Gerald's mother, to set up a pottery in the old stables to continue the work of Count Giuseppe Teuma Castelletti.

At that time, it was called "Malta Industries Association" because it formed part of a group of industries, including weaving, set up by Cecilia. Indeed, these were the first industries set up for Maltese workers at a time when the Maltese economy was diversifying from solely one based on servicing the British forces. Eventually, the pottery acquired its own identity and the name of "Ceramika Seracina", which has now been changed to "Ceramika Maltija". A key player responsible for the setting up of the Pottery was Charles Bone, a prominent artist and potter from Puttenham, Surrey. In 1951, the 25-year-old Charles was asked by Cecilia to come to Malta to start up the pottery, which was then intended to offer employment to women. This he did, together with his wife, the sculptor Sheila Mitchell, during a period of six weeks in Malta in 1952. At that time absolutely no glazed pottery was made in Malta at all, so the pottery became Malta's first of its kind. The pottery started from scratch so its management and artists had a hard time developing an artistic style that was distinguishably of a Maltese character, mainly because Malta had been occupied for many centuries so its art was dominated by influences of a foreign character. Naturally, this hindered the evolution of an endemic Maltese style. Nonetheless, the pottery employed artists like Carmel Gerada, who applied the patterns of Maltese lace to the ceramics, and Aldo Cremona, who developed the scroll pattern that adorns so much of the pottery's work even today.

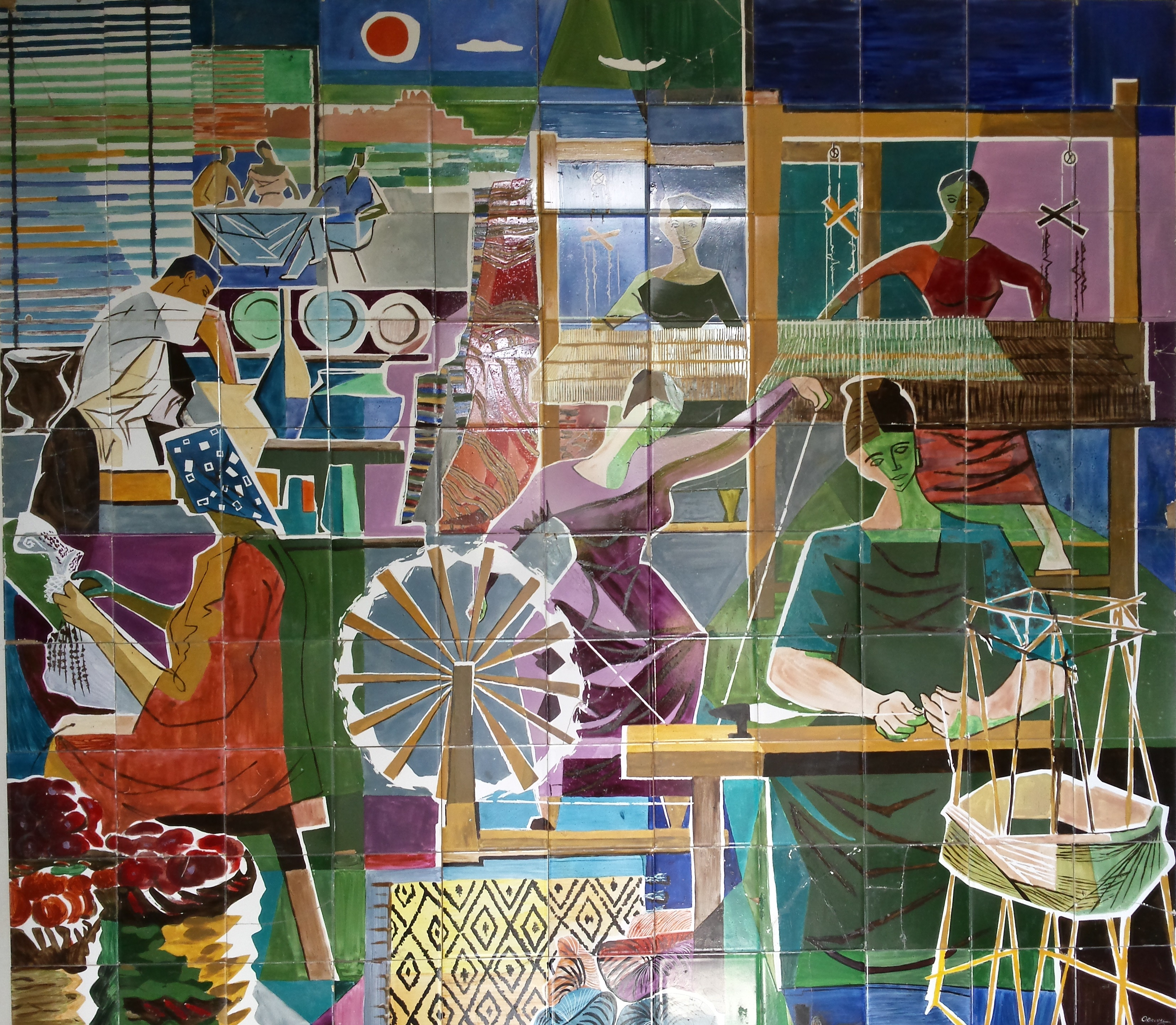
De Trafford Industries by Frank Portelli, 1962, - glaze on tiles.

Most of the ceramic work produced by the pottery from its first years of operation has always been slip cast white earthenware. The pottery specialises in the production of items such as dining sets, stylised representations of Mediterranean life, images of saints, the renowned dolphin and pineapple lamps, and large plates decorated with scenes from local life. The colours used are the fresh and bright colours of Malta and the designs themselves, namely fish, fruit, scroll patterns and lace sgraffito, are quirky and full of life. All the products of the pottery are made and painted by hand so each piece is completely unique.

== Today ==
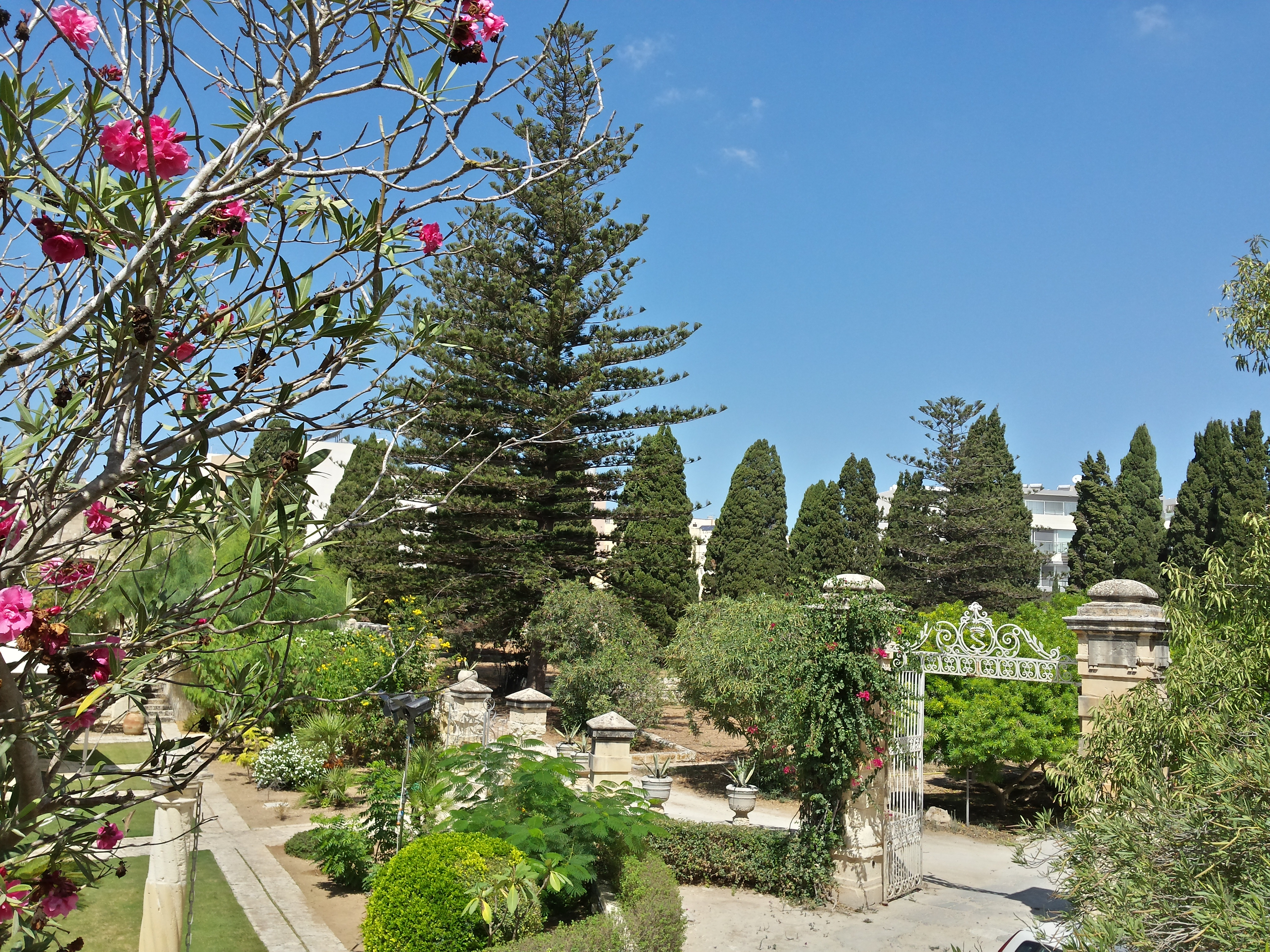
Villa Bologna is currently undergoing comprehensive renovation.

Villa Bologna remains the residence of the de Traffords, the latest generation of the descendants of Fabrizio Grech, the man who built it. Like all other such estates, it has faced varying fortunes over the centuries. Shortly after the death of Lady Strickland, the woman who transformed the fortunes of the estate in the interwar period, the political and economic turmoil of the decolonisation period in Maltese history hit the villa and the family fortunes hard. More recently, the family is reviving the villa by turning it into a working estate. The gardens are now wholly accessible to the public and the villa may be booked for corporate and private events of all sorts. As with all such properties, the villa is a popular venue for filming. The family's interest in gardening has not wavered since the days of Lady Strickland. Various ventures of horticulture are taking place, with methods of gardening and farming that are as natural as possible. The produce of the villa is on sale to the public from the grounds of the property. The house itself, and the collections, are not yet available to the public since much restoration has to be carried out before they are made thus available. However, the World War II shelter is freely accessible for anyone taking the garden tour. As always, the family is a dedicated sponsor of philanthropic events, and the villa hosts many such events throughout the year.

Many things make Villa Bologna unique but it is the constant residence of the family that breathes life and soul into it. The majesty of the house and the fabulous character of the gardens are brought to life by the work the family puts into maintaining and developing it for the purpose of turning it into a major socio-cultural centre in Maltese life. Above all, it is thanks to the eclectic origins of the family that owns the villa that what once a typical Mediterranean country house in the style of the Italian Baroque has been transformed into what is essentially an English stately home under the Mediterranean sun.

The villa is listed on the National Inventory of the Cultural Property of the Maltese Islands.

== Notable residents ==
- Lord Strickland
- Edeline Sackville-West
- Mary Constance Strickland
- Cecilia Victoria Strickland
- Mabel Strickland

== Notable visitors ==
- Fra Andrew Bertie
- Lord Mountbatten
- Queen Elizabeth II
- David Niven
- Noël Coward
- Raymond de Trafford
- Julian Huxley
- Dominic Mintoff
- Desmond Morris

== See also ==
- List of Baroque residences

== Bibliography ==
- Attard Montalto, John, A Belligerent Vicar-General and the Bologna Dynasty, The Sunday Times of Malta, May 2, 2004, p. 41.
- Ciappara, Frans, The Roman Inquisition in Enlightened Malta, Malta : Pubblikazzjonijiet Indipendenza, 2000.
- Gauci, Charles, The Genealogy of the Noble Families of Malta, Volume 1, Gulf Publishing, Valletta 1981.
- Jackewicz Johnston, Shirley, Splendor of Malta, Rizzoli International Publications, New York 2001.
- London Gazette, The: https://www.thegazette.co.uk.
- Mahoney, Leonard, A History of Maltese Architecture from Ancient Times up to 1800, Veritas Press, Malta 1988.
- MEPA: http://www.mepa.org.mt/.
- Pine, L. G., (ed.), Burke’s Peerage, 100th Edition, London 1953.
- Property and Construction Supplement, Times of Malta, Wednesday, January 15, 2014.
- Sant Fournier: Sant Fournier.
- Smith, Harrison and Koster, Adrianus, Lord Strickland Servant of the Crown, Volume 1, Progress Press, Valletta 1984.
- Smith, Harrison and Koster, Adrianus, Lord Strickland Servant of the Crown, Volume 2, Progress Press, Valletta 1986.
- Villa Bologna: http://www.villabologna.com/.
