= Attard =

Attard Ħ'Attard Casal Attard
- Local council
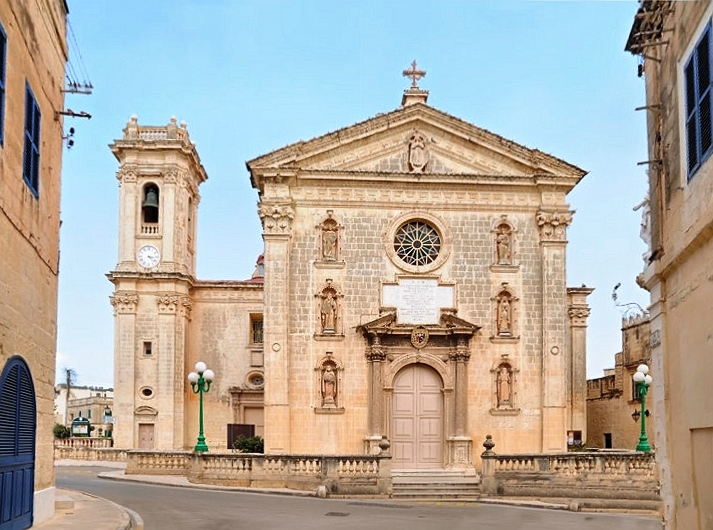
- Parish Church of St Mary, Attard

- Flag Coat of arms
- Motto: Florigera rosis halo (I perfume the air with my blossoms)
- Coordinates: 35°53′34″N 14°26′18″E
- Country: Malta
- Region: Northern Region
- District: Western District
- Borders: Balzan, Lija, Mdina, Mosta, Mtarfa, Żebbuġ, Qormi

Government
  - Mayor: Stefan Cordina (PN)

Area
  - Total: 6.6 km^{2} (2.5 sq mi)

Population (July 2024)
  - Total: 12,998
  - Density: 1,724/km^{2} (4,470/sq mi)
- Demonym: Saraċini
- Time zone: UTC+1 (CET)
  - Summer (DST): UTC+2 (CEST)
- Postal code: ATD
- Dialing code: 356
- ISO 3166 code: MT-01
- Patron saint: Assumption of Mary
- Day of festa: 15 August
- Website: Official website

Attard (Maltese: Ħ'Attard) is a locality in the Northern Region of Malta. Together with Balzan and Lija, it forms part of the "Three Villages" (Maltese: It-Tliet Irħula) and has been inhabited since the Classical Period. It has a population of 12,268 as of 2021. Attard's traditional Latin motto is Florigera rosis halo ("I perfume the air with my blossoms") due to its many flower gardens and citrus orchards. Attard is abundant in public gardens. The inhabitants of Attard are known as saraċini.

The population of Attard was 12,988 in July 2024. This included 6.626 males and 6,372 females; 11,074 Maltese nationals and 1,924 foreign nationals.

== Etymology ==
The name of 'Attard' is thought to have been derived from a surname assumed to belong to the first person who lived there. It is unclear what the word 'Attard' means. Some say it means blossoms as the word 'Attar' means fresh oil of the flowers or from the Arabic 'Atr', meaning perfume.

Another derivation for the surname is the Italian town of "Atti" in Bologna.

A few maps from the 1600s also show Attard listed as 'C. Attardo', which might show where the village name derives from.

The prefix Ħ' is a contraction of the word Ħal, itself a contraction of raħal (transl. village).

== Municipality ==
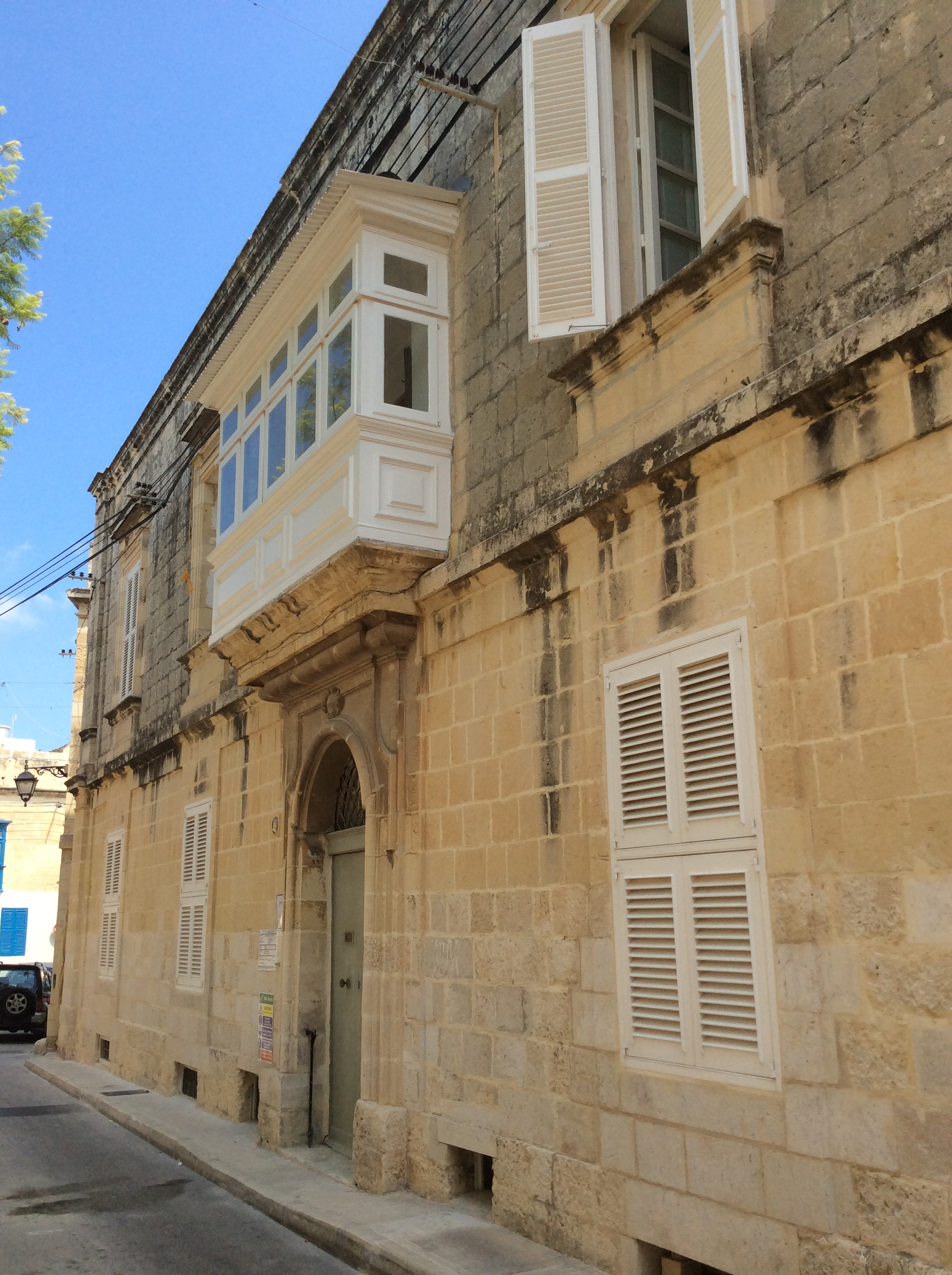
Casa Bonavita, historic 18th-century house in Attard, Malta. Scheduled and cultural property.

As a municipality with its own local government structure since 1994, Attard covers a surface area of about seven square kilometers. Its population, including the modern estate of Misraħ Kola and surrounding environs, is around 10,000. It comprises to its North, facing the city of Mdina, the flat expanse called Ta' Qali. Beneath it the area known as Tal-Idward joins with Misraħ Kola, across from Wied San Martin (St Martin's Valley), Wied Inċita (Valley of Instigation) and Wied Irmiedi (Valley of Ashes), on the Żebbuġ side.

Its western front is bordered by Wied is-Sewda (Black Valley), on the Qormi side. To its east, up to Tal-Mirakli (of the Miracles) chapel on the Lija side, is a large zone called Ta' Fġieni bordering the village core and the 17th-century Parish Church of St. Mary at its centre, built by architect Tommaso Dingli. Dingli, born and bred in Attard, is best known for his work on the Wignacourt Aqueduct, Porta Reale (the entrance into Valletta) and several churches. Of these, only Attard's parish church (with its idiosyncratic façade) and the old parish church of Birkirkara remain unaltered. South of the village core is the Sant'Anton Quarter, named for San Anton Palace and the palace's botanic gardens, both built by the Knights between around 1600 and 1625. It is now the official residence of the president of Malta and has long been a symbol of Attard.

== Zones in Attard ==
- Misraħ Kola
- Hal-Warda
- Ta' Qali
  - Robbu Tal-Ħemsija
  - Ta' Ħemsija
  - Ta' Qali Crafts Village
  - Ta' Sagħat
  - Ta' Vnezja
  - Tal-Madliena
  - Tal-Madonna
  - Tal-Maltija
- Ta' Qassati
- Il-Ħotob
- Il-Ħofor
- Santa Katerina
- Ta' Fġieni
- Ta' l-Idward
- Ta' Srina
- Ta' Vestru
- Tal-Fuklar
- Tal-Karri
- Tal-Mirakli
- Wied il-Ħemsija
- Wied Inċita
- Wied is-Sewda

== Development ==
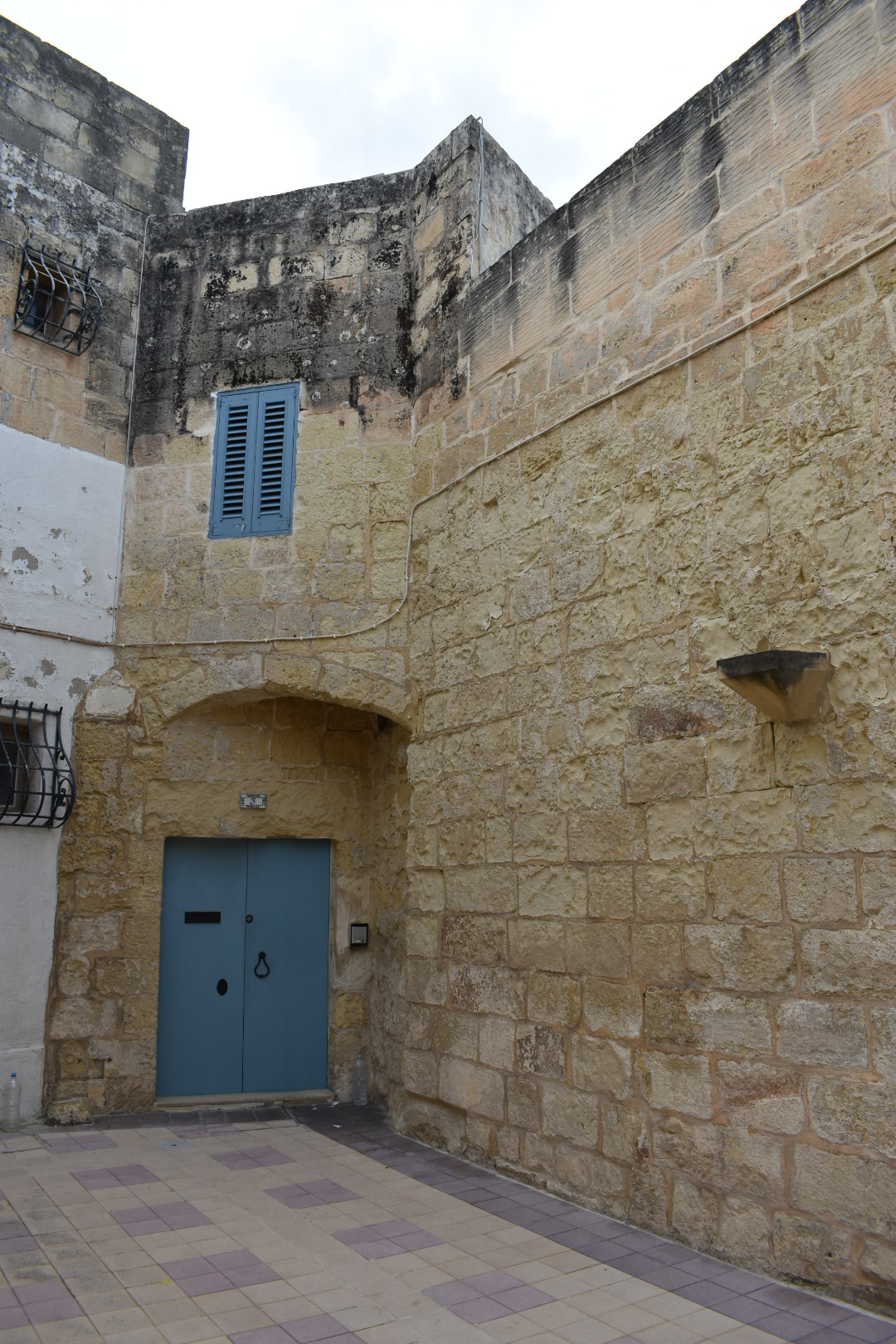
A vernacular 17th-century farmhouse in Attard

During the 1980s Attard experienced a boost in development, reflected in the large-scale construction surrounding the village center. However the area surrounding the church and the Sant'Anton Quarter features a number of converted farmhouses (recognizable through their wooden doors and flat, rustic roofs) and residences built by the Knights of St John, surrounding the summer palace. Attard is also the location of the St Catherine Nursing Home, one of the largest in the Maltese Islands. The Attard Primary School serves as a polling station during elections and like all other localities in Malta, Attard Local Council elections are held every three years.

An increase in entertainment and commercial enterprise has seen development along Triq il-Pitkalija (Pitkalija Road) and near the village center, with various retail outlets catering to the village all within walking distance of St Mary's Parish Church. The village center is a hive of activity, especially on Sundays when residents of Attard mingle with fellow churchgoers.

Attard celebrates the feast of the Assumption of Mary on 15 August, which is a national holiday on the Maltese islands.

== Clubs and societies ==
The Malta Amateur Radio League club house is situated in Attard and is the representative body for amateur radio in Malta. Since MARL was established in 1922, its aim was to bring together people interested in amateur radio/electronics and discuss and defend amateur radio matters with the local authorities. It provides educational facilities for members with interest in amateur radio/electronics and also an equipped amateur radio station. MARL corresponds and expresses its ideas with local and foreign same-interest groups, providing its members the facilities of a two-way QSL Bureau as well as financing and maintaining VHF & Analog television repeaters and beacons.

The musical society of La Stella Levantina (Eastern Star) is the first of its kind in the village (formed in 1894). It organizes the major activities of the village feast held during 11–15 August, including band marches and feast decorations. It teaches music (at no cost) in its local club, situated in the center of the village.

== Notable residents ==
The president's official residence, San Anton Palace, is situated in Attard. Within walking distance of the president's residence is the official residence of the United States Ambassador to Malta. The Tunisian embassy to Malta is located in Attard.

Gerald Strickland was also a resident of Attard, at Villa Bologna.

Attard is also home to Archbishop Paul Cremona and Tiffany Pisani, the winner of Britain's Next Top Model season 6.

=== San Anton Palace ===
Visitors to the palace have included the Grand Masters of the Order of St John, Queen Marie of Romania, the Russian Empress Marie Feodorovna, King Edward VII, Queen Elizabeth II, Napoleon's younger brother Louis Bonaparte as a prisoner, and the poet Samuel Taylor Coleridge.

Governor Borton opened the botanic gardens to the public in 1882 for picnics and strolls. Fairs and competitions celebrating plants, flowers, animals and livestock take place there. A dramatic company used to put on a Shakespeare Festival every summer, and there are often music recitals.

During the Commonwealth Heads of Government Meeting 2005, hosted by Malta, the President's Palace in Attard served as a residence for Queen Elizabeth II and Prince Philip.

== Notable ==
- Joseph Calleja, operatic tenor

== Sport ==
Attard is the home of Attard F.C., currently competing in the BOV Amateur League I (third tier).

== Twin towns – sister cities ==
Attard is twinned with:

- Élancourt, France
- Pieve Emanuele, Italy
