= Parish Church of St Mary, Birkirkara =

Parish Church of the Assumption of Mary
- Il-Knisja Parrokjali ta' Santa Marija
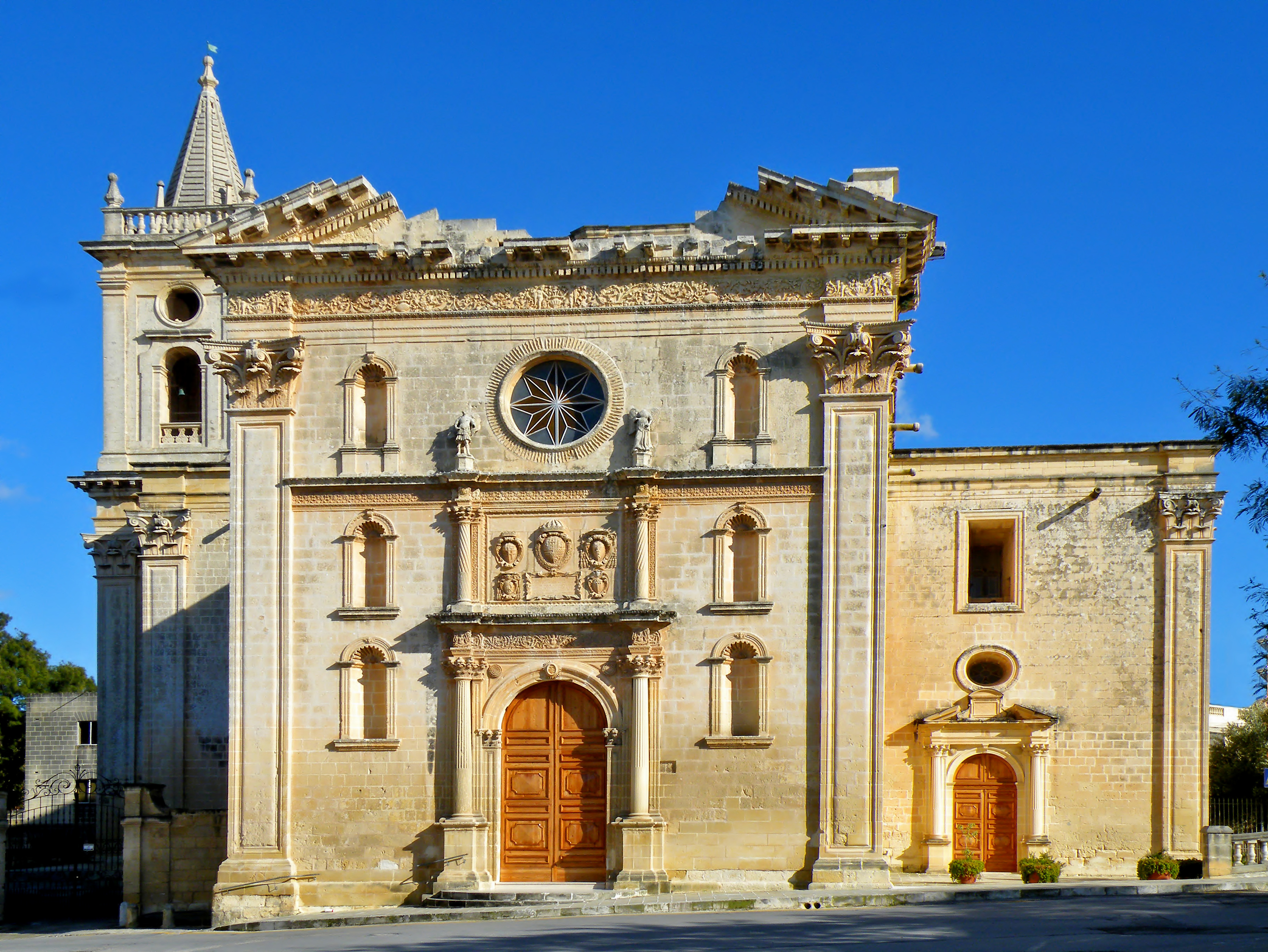
- The church's façade in 2009
- Parish Church of the Assumption of Mary
- 35°53′42″N 14°27′47″E
- Location: Birkirkara, Malta
- Denomination: Roman Catholic
- Website: www.santamarijabirkirkara.com

History
- Status: Parish church
- Dedication: Assumption of Mary

Architecture
- Functional status: Active
- Architect(s): Vittorio Cassar and Tommaso Dingli
- Style: Renaissance and Baroque
- Years built: c. 1615 – c. 1679

Specifications
- Materials: Limestone

The Parish Church of Saint Mary (Maltese: Il-Knisja ta' Santa Marija), commonly known as il-Knisja l-Qadima (the old church) is a Roman Catholic parish church in Birkirkara, Malta, dedicated to the Assumption of Mary. It was built in the 17th century, and it has a Renaissance design attributed to the architects Vittorio Cassar and Tommaso Dingli.

The church fell out of use when St Helen's Basilica replaced it as Birkirkara's parish church in the 18th century. Its roof and dome collapsed in the 19th century, and the church remained in ruins until it was restored in the second half of the 20th century. It became a parish church once again in 2005.

== History ==
The Parish Church of St Mary is located outside the historic centre of Birkirkara, and it was built on a hill so as to be protected from corsair attacks. In the medieval period, a church dedicated to the Assumption of Mary and St Helen existed on the site of the present church. A cemetery and two small chapels were found in the vicinity.

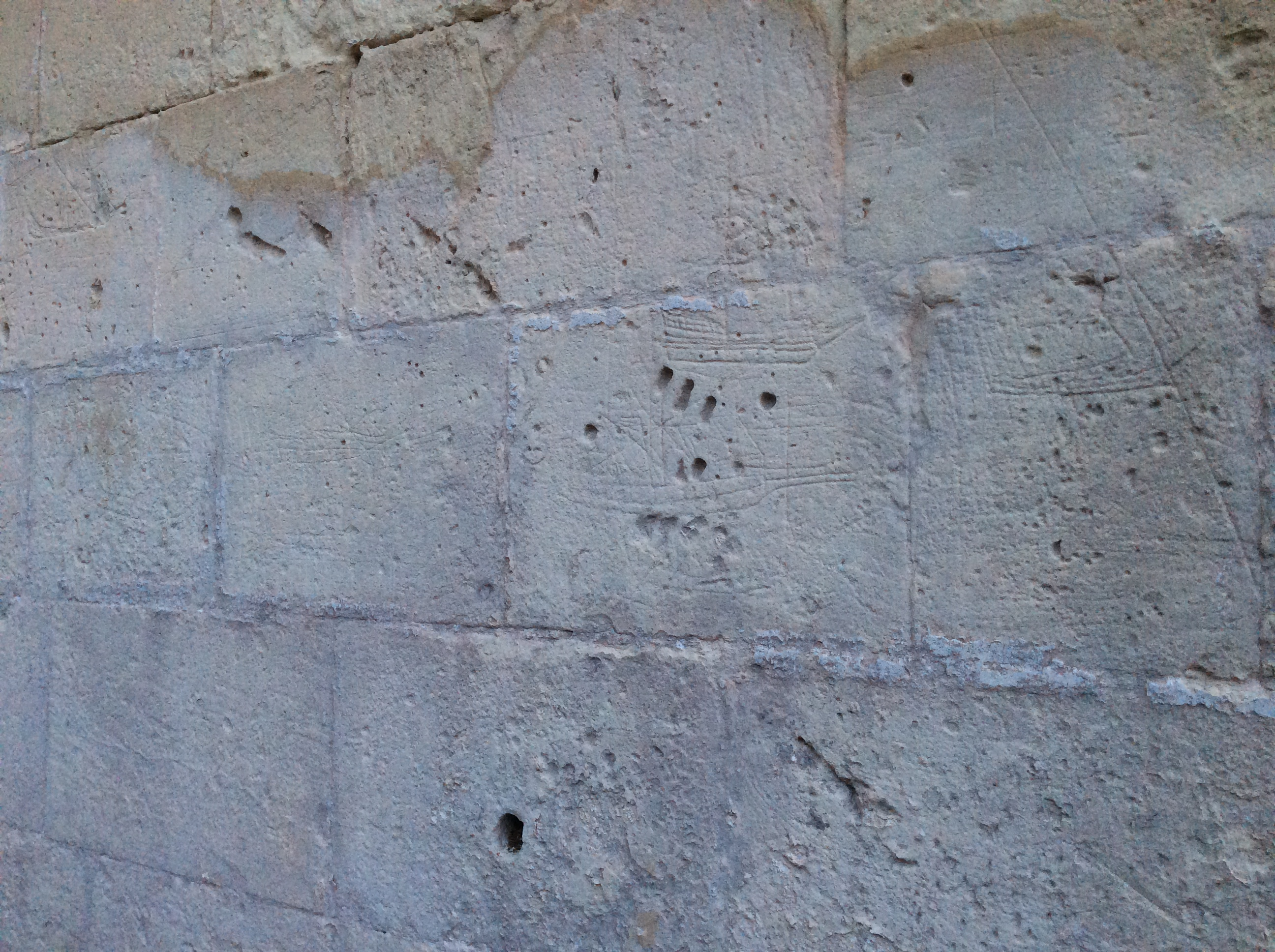
Some of the graffiti, dating to the Hospitallers period, on the side façade

Construction of the present church began in the early 17th century, probably in 1615 or 1616. Work on the church continued throughout the century, and the interior was almost completed by 1646. The dome was finished in around 1656, while the belfry was built in around 1679.

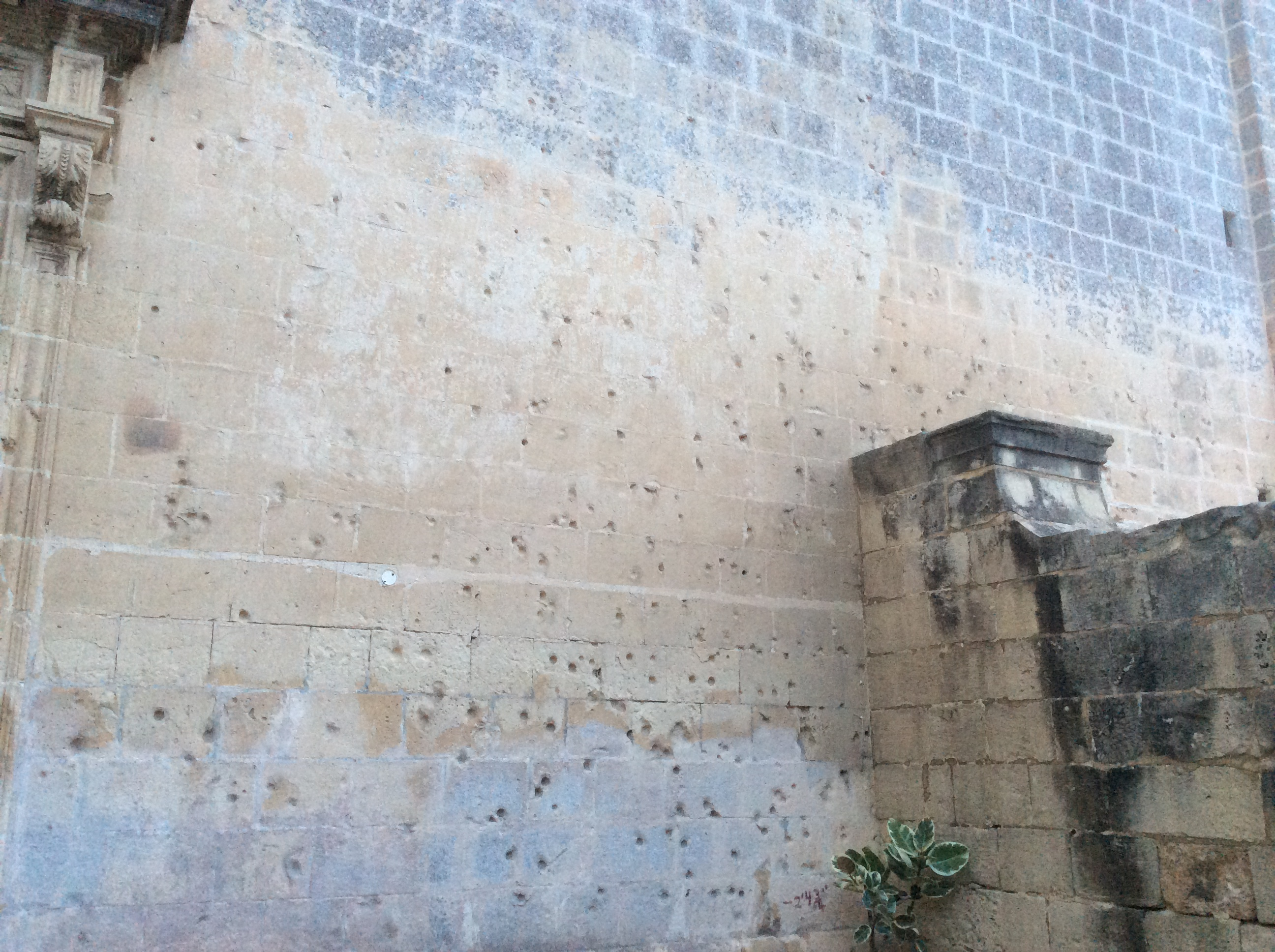
Bullet marks, dating to the French occupation of Malta, on the side of the church

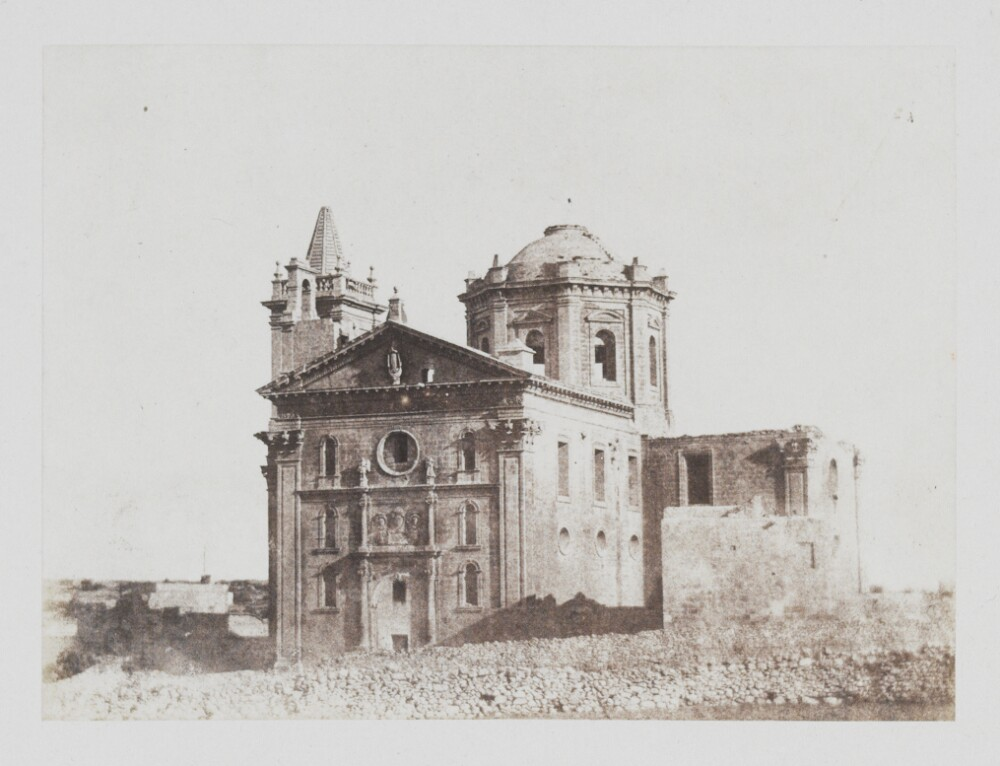
The church in 1846, ten years before the collapse of the dome

The church fell out of use in the late 18th century, after the St Helen's Basilica was blessed in 1782. Bishop Vincenzo Labini visited the church in 1787, and he found it in a state of disrepair, with the roof in danger of collapsing. The doors and windows of the church were barred, and it was only used for funerals. Part of the roof collapsed by 1830, and the dome and the rest of the roof were destroyed in an earthquake on 24 June 1856. The belfry was in danger of collapsing by 1894.

On 3 December 1910, the first committee for the restoration of the church was established. Restoration actually began on 7 October 1969, and the roof of the nave was rebuilt by 1972. Works continued throughout the following decades until the 1990s, although restoration is still not complete. The church became a parish once again in 2005. It is now the third parish of Birkirkara, along with those of St. Helen and St. Joseph the worker

There are currently some structural problems with the church, and there are several cracks within its walls. Despite this, the risk of collapse is considered remote.

The church is scheduled as a Grade 1 national monument, and it is also listed on the National Inventory of the Cultural Property of the Maltese Islands.

== Architecture ==
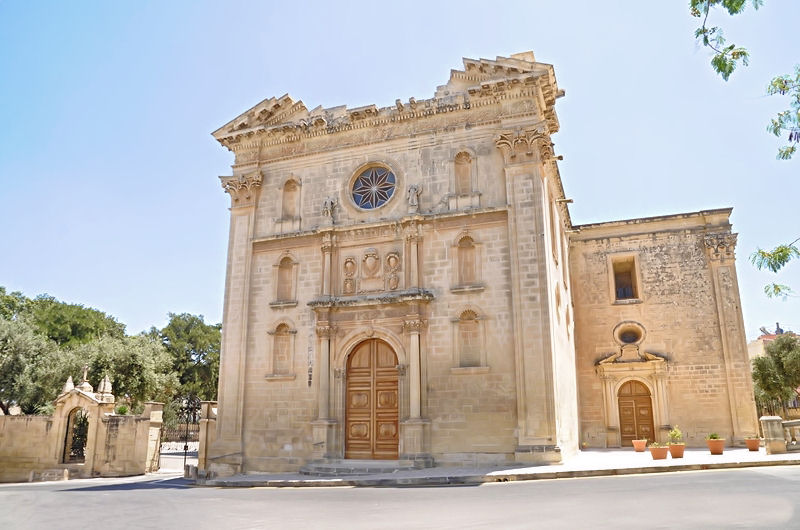
View of the Parish Church of St. Mary

The Parish Church of St Mary is an example of Renaissance architecture. The church is commonly attributed to the architects Vittorio Cassar and Tommaso Dingli. There is no documentary evidence of Cassar's involvement and this attribution is disputed since he was probably dead when work on the church began, but Dingli's involvement is well-established.

The church's façade has Corinthian pilasters, and the central bay has an arched main doorway flanked by columns on either side. The door is topped by five escutcheons containing coats of arms, including those of King Philip II of Spain, Grand Master Alof de Wignacourt, Bishop Baldassare Cagliares and the parish priest Don Filippo Borg. The stonework around the doorway and the coats of arms is very ornate, and it is probably influenced by the Spanish Plateresque style. Each of the two side bays contains three empty niches.

The church's interior is ornate, with sculpture forming an integral part of the building.

== See also ==
- Culture of Malta
- History of Malta
- List of churches in Malta
- Religion in Malta
