= Balluta Buildings =

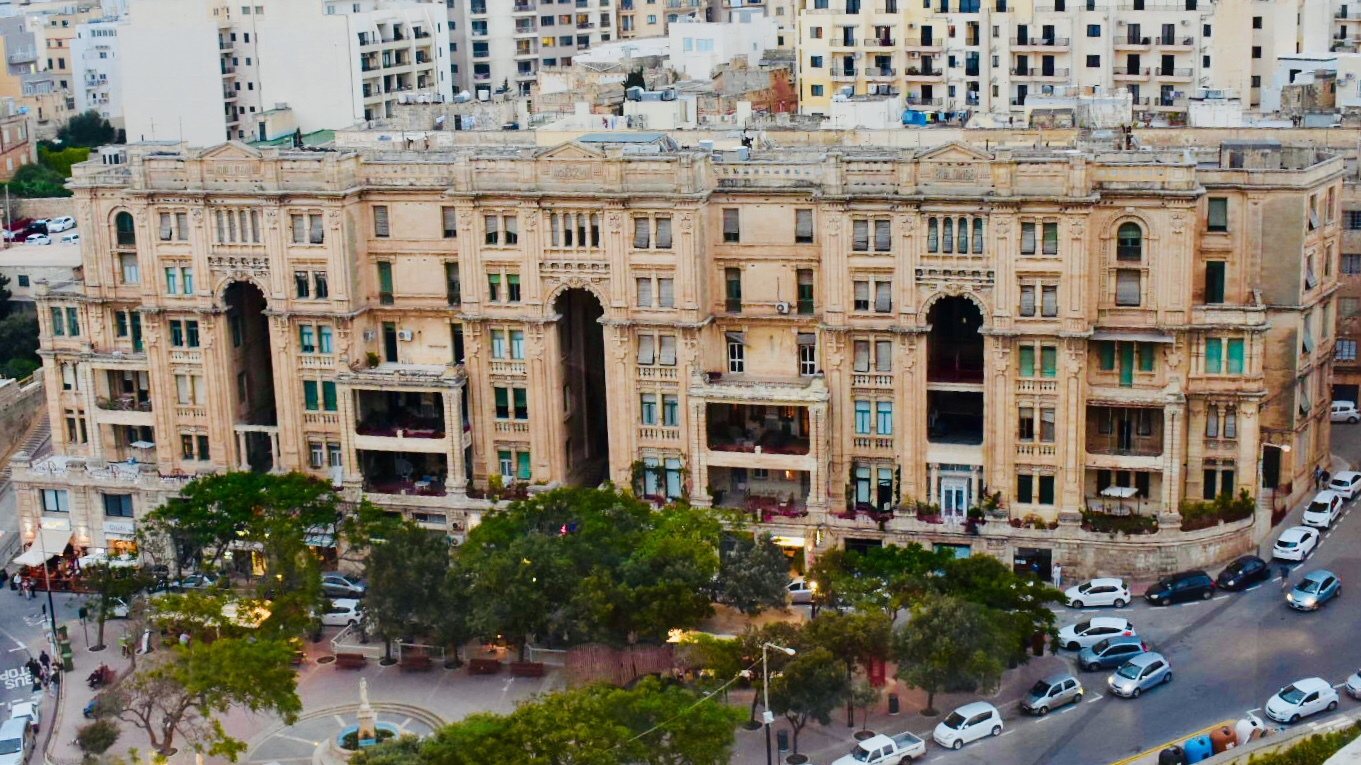
- View of Balluta Buildings
- Interactive map of the Balluta Buildings area

General information
- Status: Intact
- Type: Apartment building
- Architectural style: Art Nouveau
- Location: Balluta, St Julian's, Malta
- Coordinates: 35°54′50″N 14°29′40″E
- Named for: Oak trees (ballut)
- Completed: 1928
- Client: Marquis John Scicluna

Technical details
- Material: Limestone

Design and construction
- Architect: Giuseppe Psaila

Balluta Buildings is an Art Nouveau apartment block overlooking Balluta Bay in St Julian's, Malta. It was built in 1928 for the Marquis John Scicluna, and it was constructed to designs of Giuseppe Psaila. The building is considered to be among the finest of the few surviving examples of Art Nouveau architecture in Malta. Now it is an icon of Balluta Bay.

== History ==
The building's site originally consisted of terraced fields, which were incorporated into the garden of the nearby Villa St Ignatius in the early 19th century. In the 1920s, the villa and its grounds were divided and sold off, and the first part of the former garden to be built up was Balluta Buildings. The apartment block was constructed in 1928 for the Marquis John Scicluna, and it was designed by the architect Giuseppe Psaila. These buildings then became apartments for the poor, who paid a little money to the Maltese government monthly. The building's name is derived from the oak trees (Maltese: ballut) which grew in the area in front of it, that also gave the bay its name.

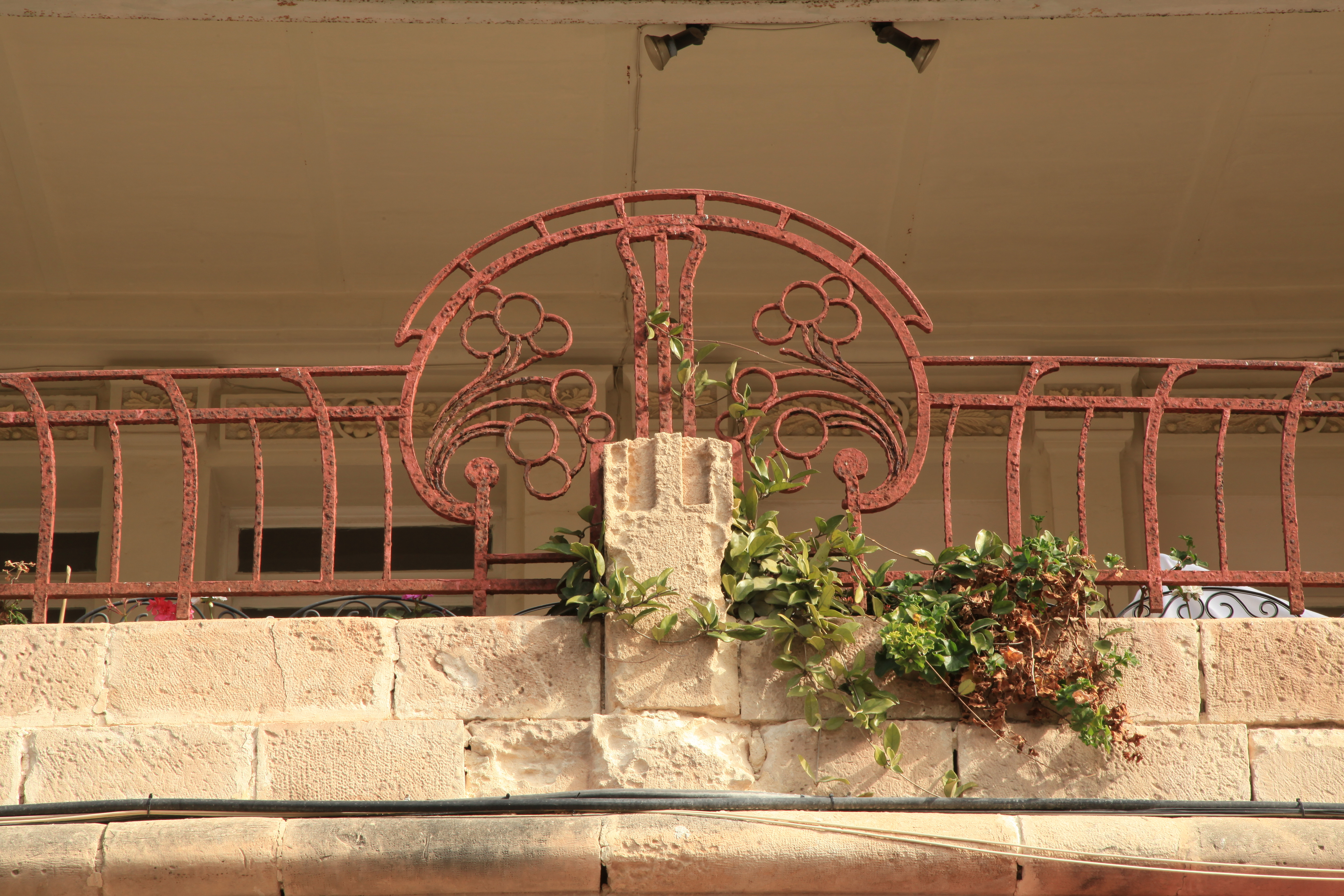
Art Nouveau ironwork at Balluta Buildings

The building originally contained some of the largest and most luxurious apartments in Europe, and it became a prestigious address in Malta. Due to rental laws, many of the tenants and their heirs kept the apartments for a small nominal rent. Out of the twenty apartments, sixteen remain in the hands of the tenants' heirs, three have returned into the possession of the owners, and one was sold to a third party. Some food outlets occupy shops at the buildings' street level.

The building remains intact and in relatively good condition, although it is in need of restoration. It is scheduled as a Grade 1 monument, and it is listed on the National Inventory of the Cultural Property of the Maltese Islands. From 2025, the Balluta Builldings has been renewed.

== Architecture ==
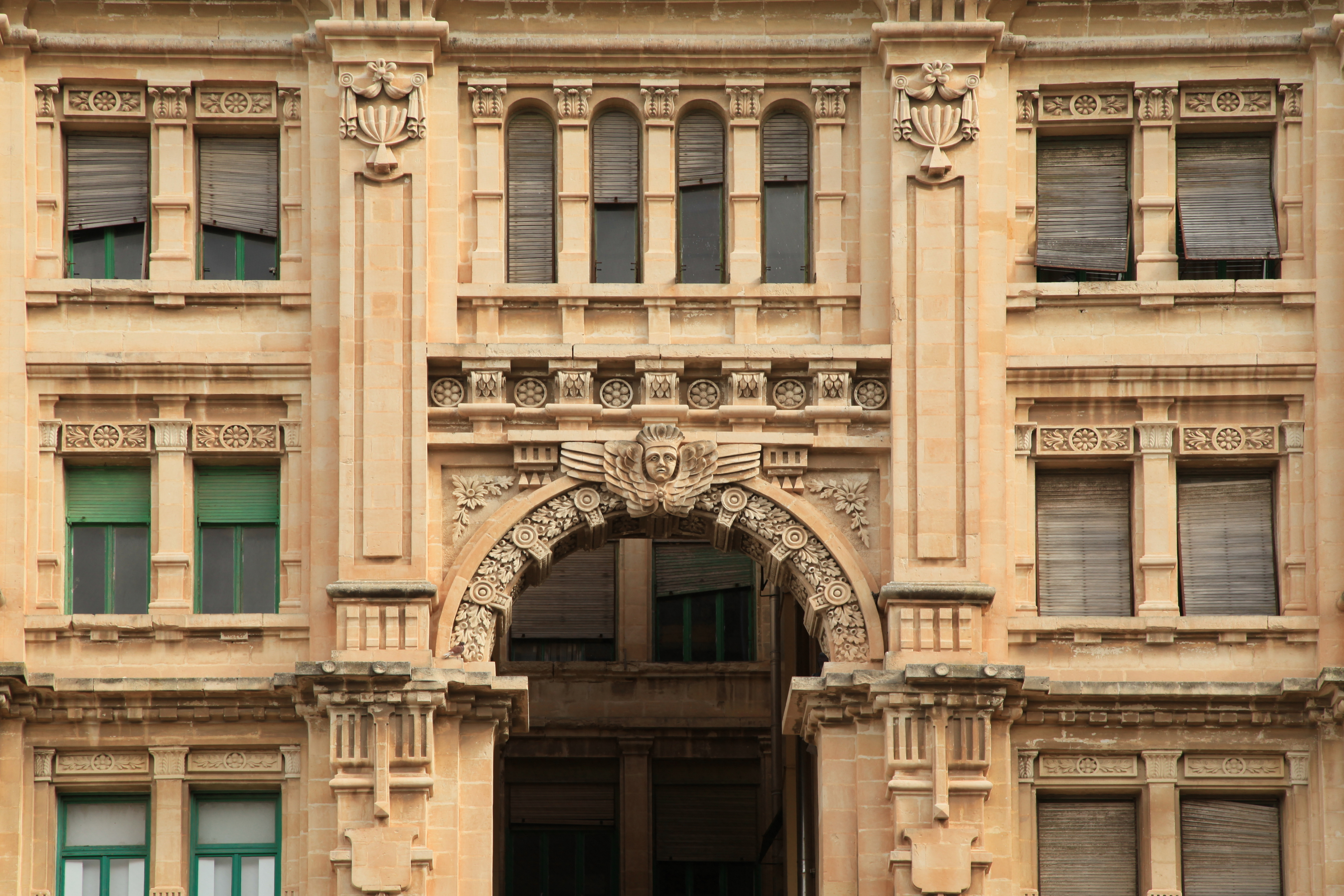
Detail of the façade showing the ornamentation

Balluta Buildings is one of the finest among the few surviving Art Nouveau buildings in Malta, and it is also regarded as Psaila's masterpiece and one of the most iconic buildings in the country. It consists of three connected blocks of flats, with three vertical structures having long vertical arched openings protruding from the rest of the building. These are topped with keystones decorated with a carved putto. The openings are flanked with a row of double windows and pilasters on either side. Each block is topped by a pediment, and the architraves below each have inscriptions which read BALLUTA (left block) BUILDINGS (right block) and A.D. MCMXXVIII (central block). The windows, pilasters and other parts of the building display intricate floral and geometric decorations.

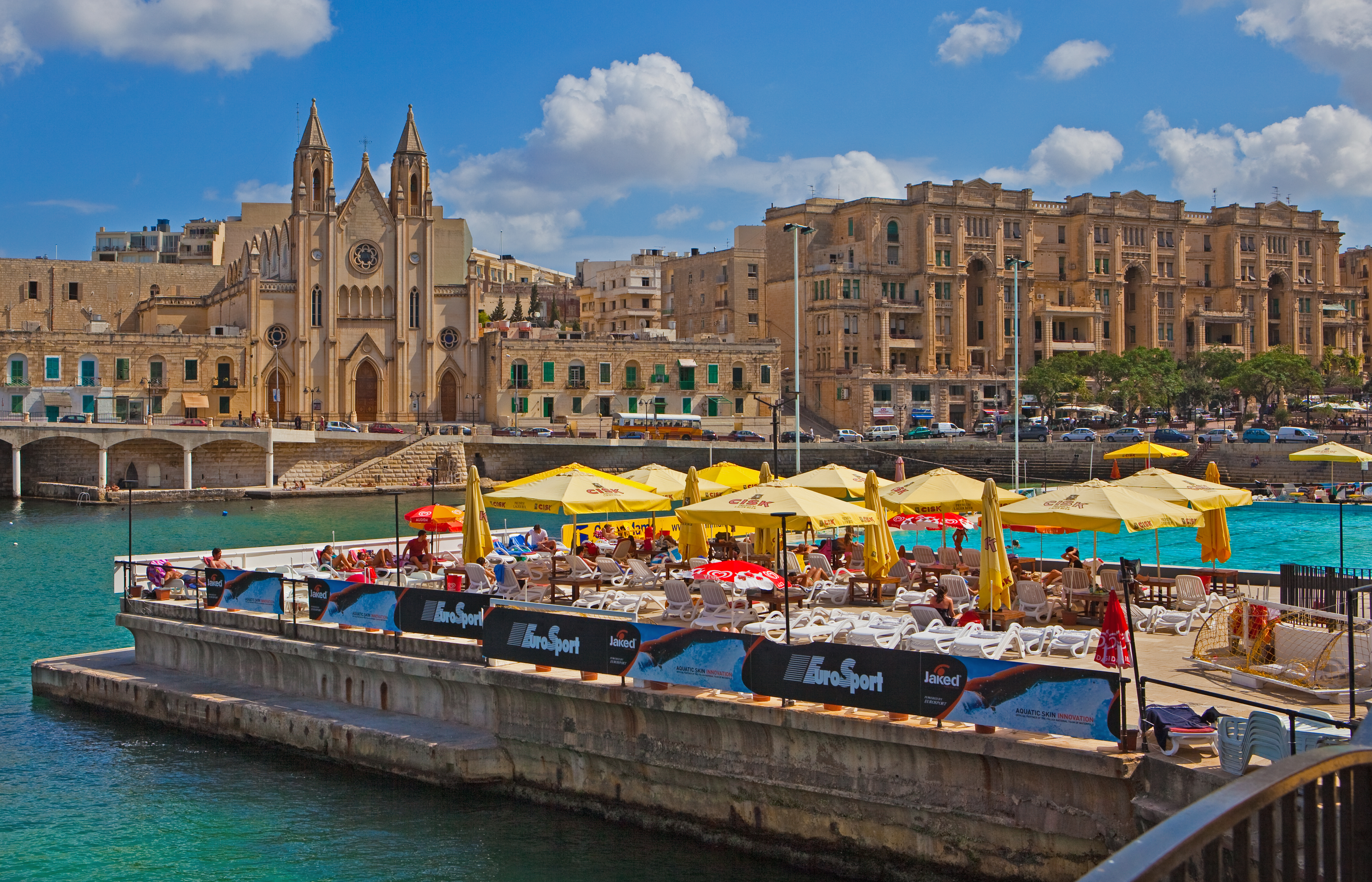
Balluta Buildings (right) and the Carmelite Church (left), overlooking Balluta Bay

The blocks are joined with verandas on the lower floors and a plain façade on the upper levels. A structure which contains a number of shops buttresses the entire building at street level, contributing to its three-dimensional quality. The building is constructed out of local limestone.

The twenty apartments within the block are large and luxurious, and they have high ceilings and columns. The interior is decorated with traditional Maltese tiles. The ironwork used throughout the building is of high quality, and it is uncertain whether this was the work of Psaila or another artisan.

== See also ==
- Palazzina Vincenti, a Modernist building located at the opposite end of Balluta Bay
