= Giuseppe Psaila =

Maltese architect (1891–1960)

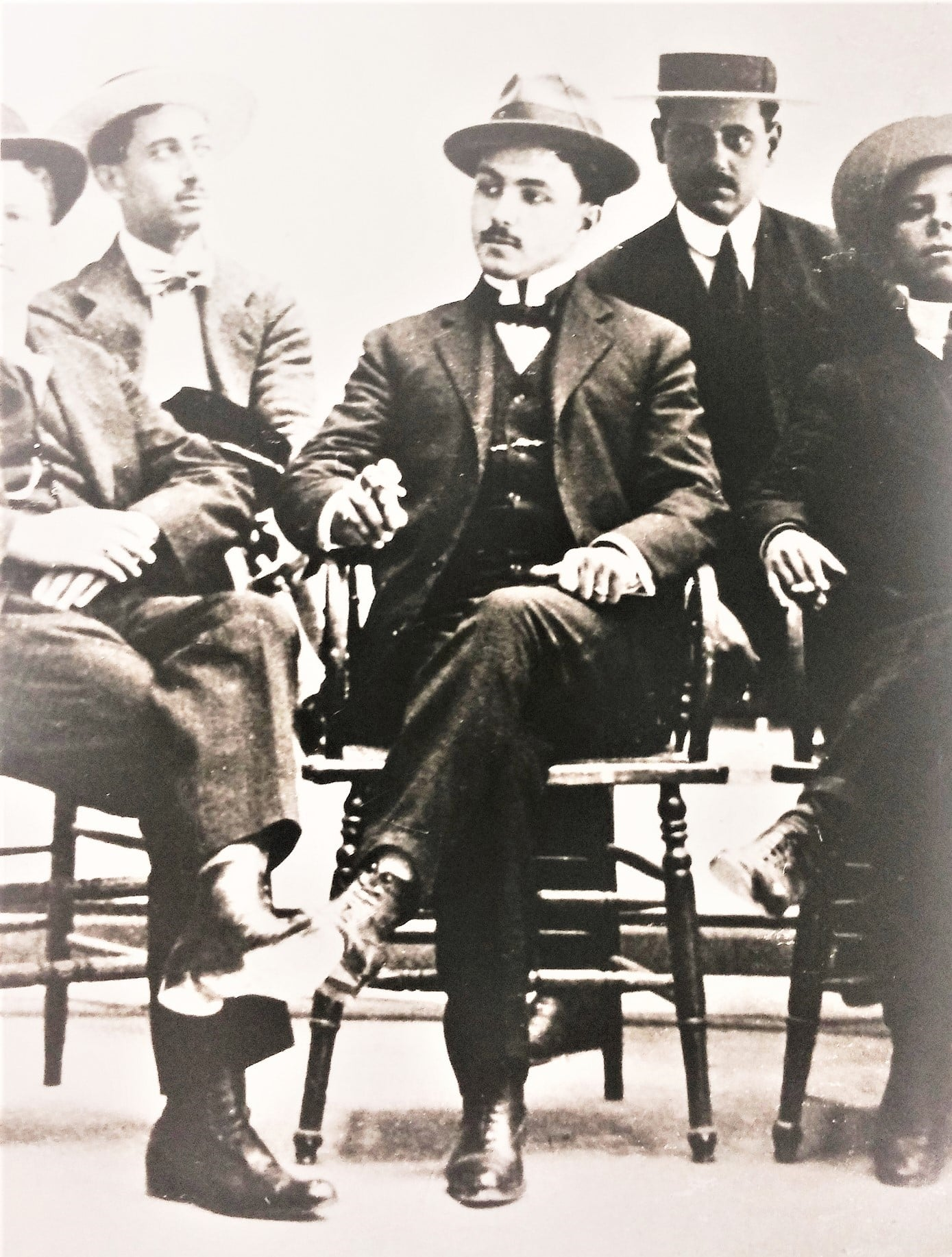
Psaila circa 1915-1920

Giuseppe or Joseph Psaila (1891–1960) was a Maltese architect. He graduated from the University of Malta in around 1915, and he was one of the few Art Nouveau architects in Malta since at the time neoclassicism was still popular, especially in the case of public buildings. He was influenced by the work of the Italian architects Raimondo D'Aronco and Ernesto Basile.

Psaila worked on a number of private commissions in the early 20th century. One of the buildings attributed to him is a landmark house at 225, Tower Road, Sliema which was built in 1914 for Antonio Cassar Torregiani. Today, this is the only surviving Art Nouveau house on the Sliema front. In 2012–13, the building was restored and converted into a Lombard Bank branch. At this point, a third story was added, conforming with the original architectural style.

Other buildings designed by Psaila in Sliema include houses in Lower Victoria Terrace (present-day Triq Dun Karm Psaila), St. Margaret Street, Stella Maris Street, Windsor Terrace, Għar il-Lembi Street and Tower Road. His two most notable works are Broadlands Mansions in Tower Road, Sliema (1926) and Balluta Buildings overlooking Balluta Bay in St. Julian's (1928). These were apartment blocks built for the Marquis John Scicluna, and they were richly ornamented buildings having large terraces. Broadlands Mansions were demolished in the 1980s, but Balluta Buildings still stand and are regarded as Psaila's masterpiece and one of Malta's most iconic buildings.

According to Edward Said, Psaila

" designed and built a number of houses in Sliema, such as a single house in Lower Victoria Terrace (now Triq Dun Karm Psaila) with columned entrance and floral motifs above the front door, triangular ventilations and railings on the balcony; a pair of dwellings in St. Margaret Street with metallic plates on the front door, houses in Stella Maris Street with circular window designs, houses in Windsor Terrace with elegant gate styles and houses in Ghar Lembi Street and Tower Road. Also on Tower Road the present Lombard Bank premises are attributed to Psaila, this building being to many the culmination of the Art nouveau liberty style in Sliema. Of course, his most notable design and construction was Balluta Buildings in St. Julians.."

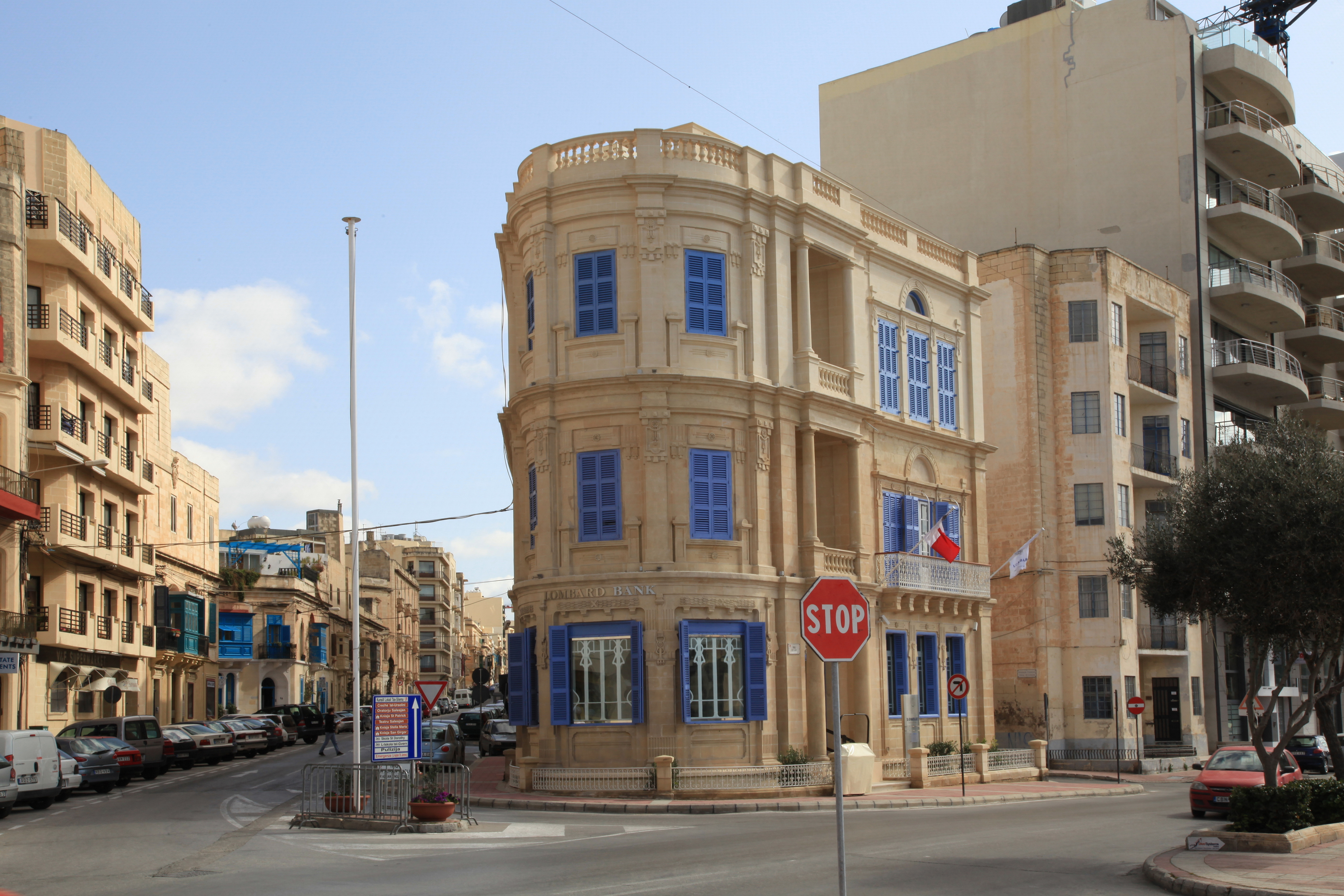
Lombard Bank building in Sliema (1914)

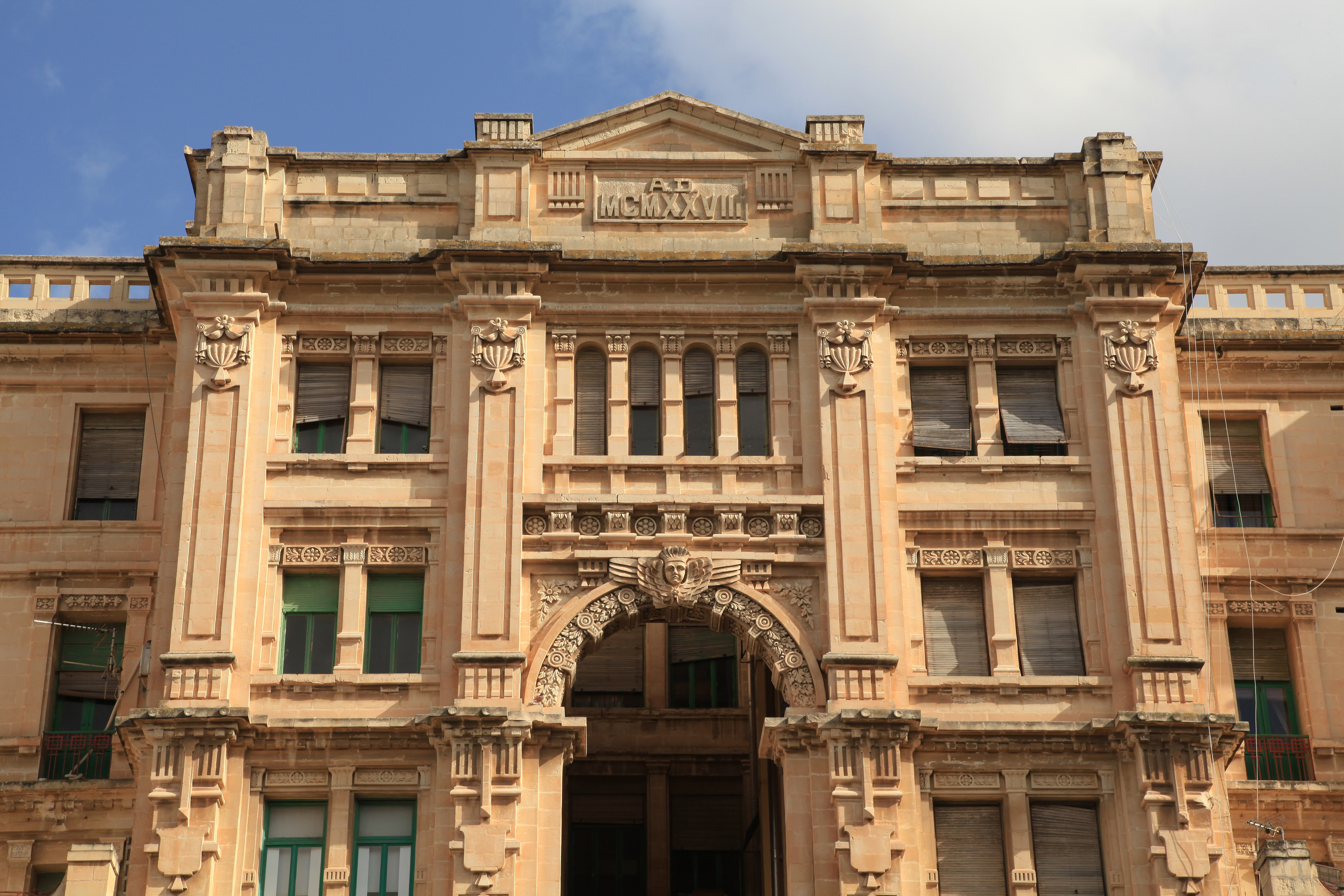
Part of the façade of Balluta Buildings (1928)

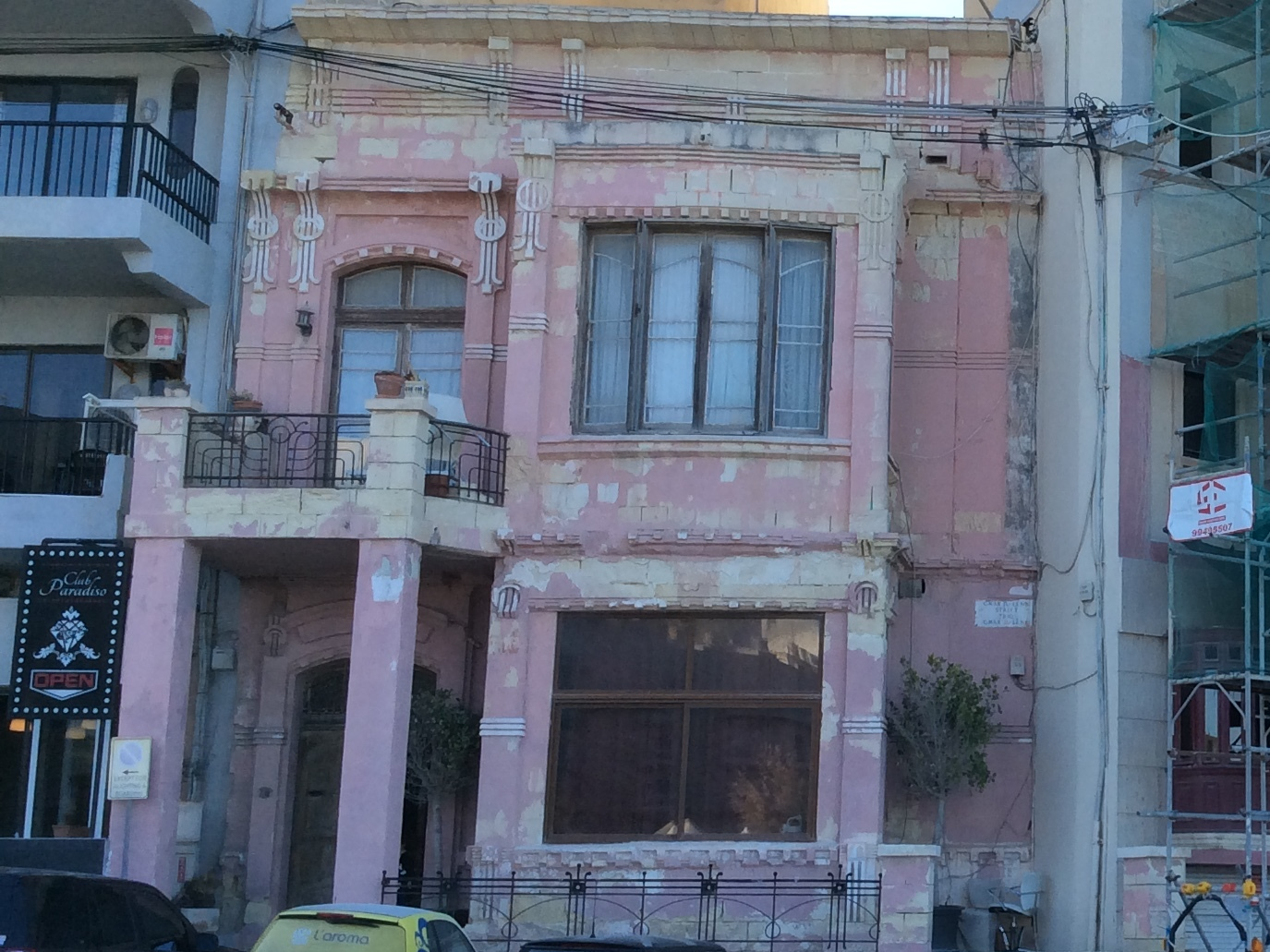
Art Nouveau townhouse in Sliema (Triq Lembi c/w Tower road)

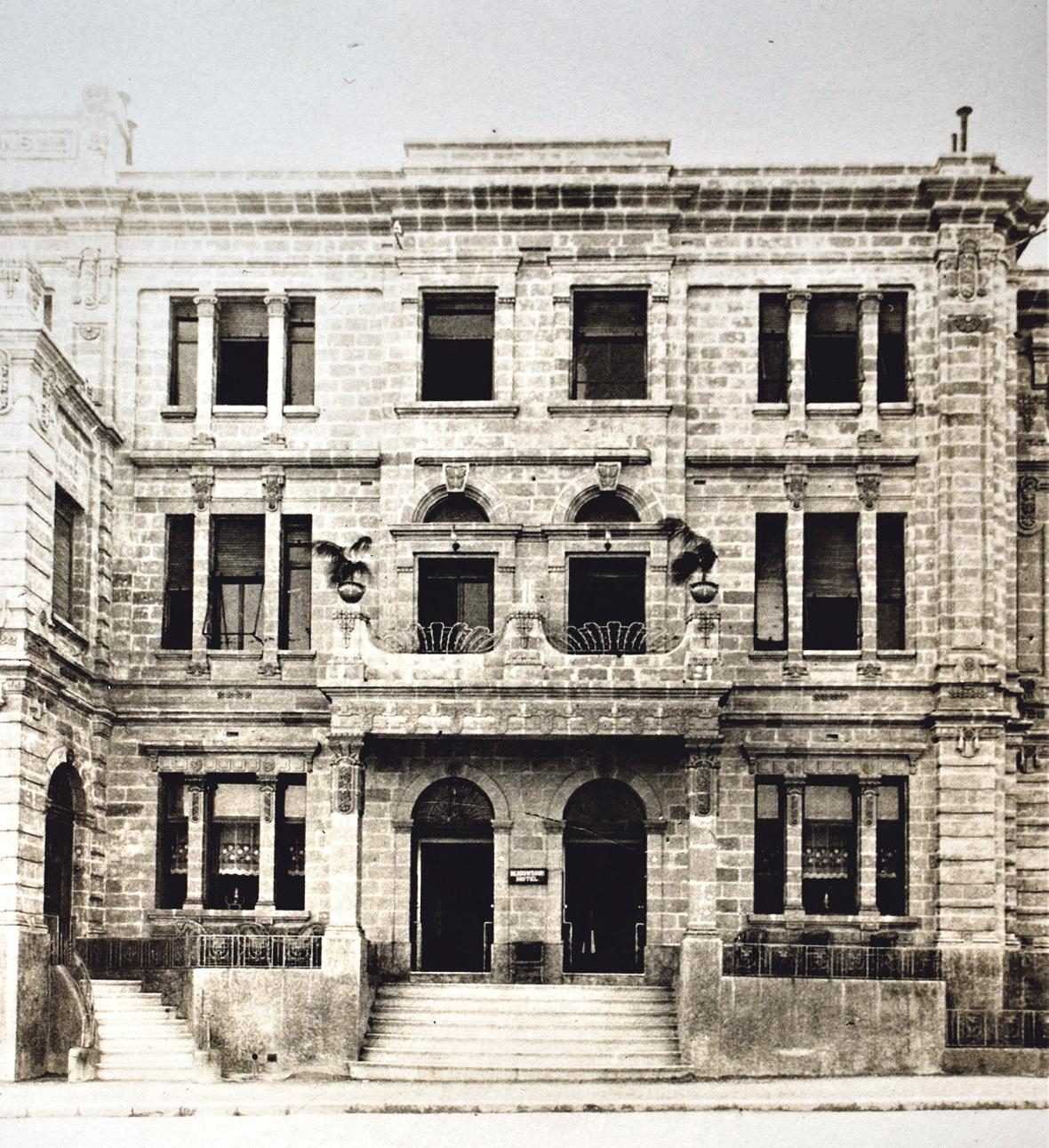
Broadlands Mansions, Sliema
