= Isabelle Barratt-Delia =

Maltese architect (born 1938)

Isabelle Barratt-Delia (née Gulia; born 1938) is the first recorded female Maltese architect of the 20th century.

== Early life and education ==
Barratt-Delia was born in the Crown Colony of Malta in 1938. She was educated at the Convent of the Sacred Heart, St Julian's. In 1961, she graduated as an architect and civil engineer from the Royal University of Malta in Valletta, now known as the University of Malta.

== Career ==
Barratt-Delia worked at Mortimer and de Giorgio Architects for a short period of time, before leaving for Canada. She worked for the Canadian Exhibition Commission between 1962 and 1964 and participated in fairs in New York City, Milan, Frankfurt and Sydney.

== Personal life ==
Barratt-Delia met Peter Barratt, an architect and urban planner, while working at Mortimer and de Giorgio Architects. They married in 1961 and moved to Canada.
