= Villa St Ignatius =

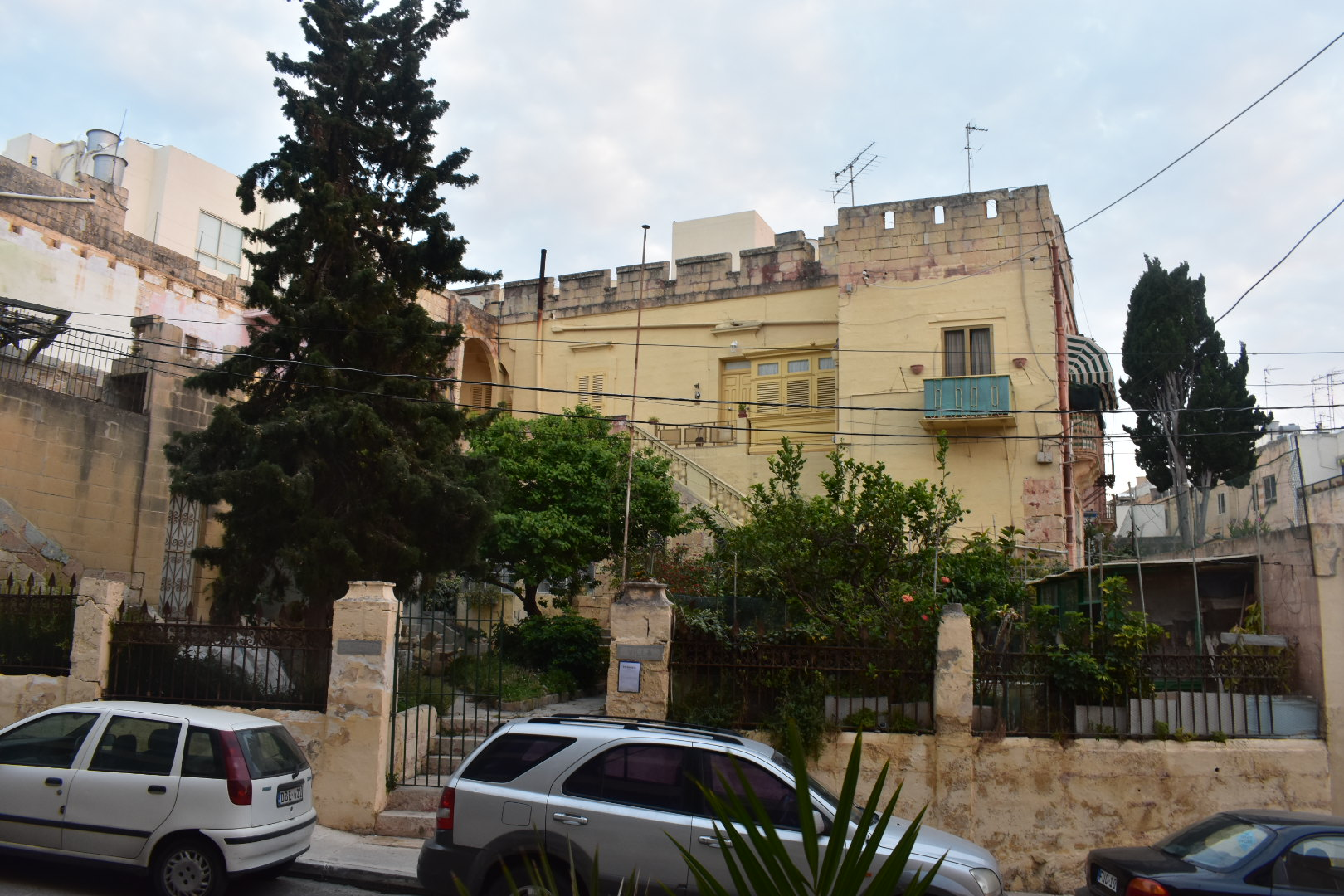
- Side of the villa, which today appears as the front
- Interactive map of the Villa St Ignatius area
- Former names: Bel-Vedere; St. Ignatius' College; St. Ignatius Hospital

General information
- Status: Partially intact
- Type: Villa
- Architectural style: Gothic Revival
- Location: Balluta, St Julian's, Malta
- Coordinates: 35.9137°N 14.4955°E
- Named for: Ignatius of Loyola
- Completed: c. 1827 (£5,000)
- Renovated: c. 1877–81 (£2,500)
- Demolished: December 2017 (partially)
- Client: John Watson

Villa St Ignatius (Maltese: Villa Sant'Injazju) is a historic villa located in the Balluta area of St Julian's, Malta. It was built in the early 19th century for the English merchant John Watson, and it might be the earliest example of Gothic Revival architecture in the country.

The house was converted into a Protestant college in 1846, and it later housed a Jesuit college, which closed down in 1907. It was used as a military hospital in World War I, before being divided into tenements. Its grounds were built up during the 20th century, and the once-imposing villa is now surrounded by apartments and other buildings.

Part of the building was controversially demolished in December 2017, violating a court order and attracting widespread condemnation by heritage NGOs and other entities. Plans to demolish the entire villa were made in April 2018, and the fate of the building currently remains unclear.

== History ==
=== Bel-Vedere ===
Villa St Ignatius was built in the early 19th century for the English merchant, John Watson, and it was originally called Bel-Vedere. It was a landmark detached country villa overlooking Balluta Bay, and it incorporated a walled garden. The earliest known description of the building was made in a book published in 1839. The building was purposely built as a country house as a farm, with its surrounding fields used for agricultural experimentation.

=== Malta Protestant College (MPC) ===
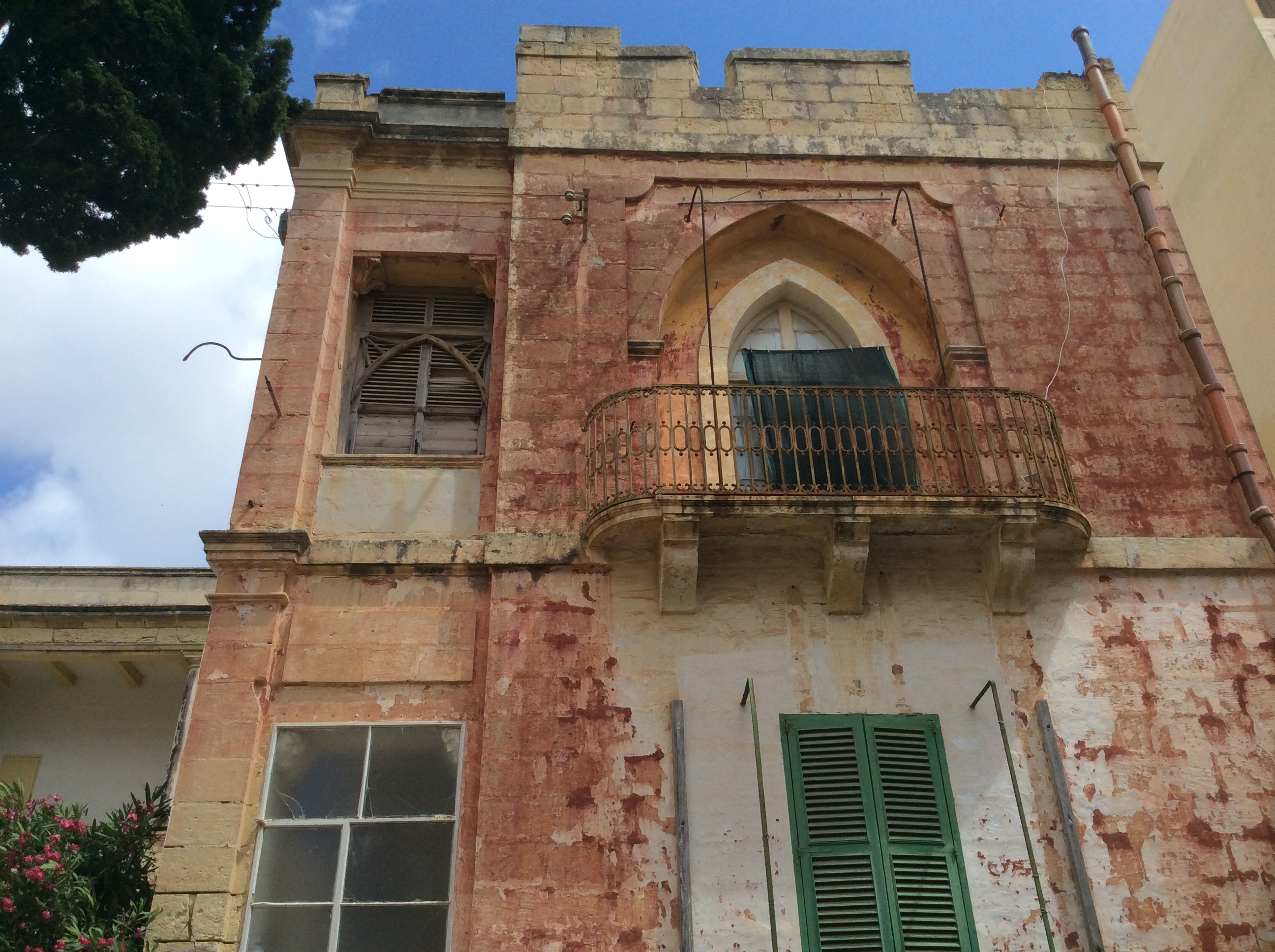
A Neo-Gothic arch on façade

In 1846, it was purchased by the English Missionary Association, in order to open a Protestant College for training Missionaries for the East. The villa has been described by a Protestant committee as “The College of St. Julian's ... a beacon-light on the rock of Malta”.

Notable project at the college, from 1839 and 1845, was the Bible translation to Modern Standard Arabic which took place under the supervision of Lutheran missionary Samuel Gobat (1799–1879). Students from Europe and the Middle-East, such as Egyptians, Greeks and Turks, were hailed to Malta requiring their conversion but the overall expectations was not considered successful. Conversion to Protestant Christianity was controversial from such conservative countries; such was the case of a former Muslim family who after adopting the new faith found refuge in Malta and hosted at the college where they also received education.

The college closed down in 1865.

=== St Ignatius College ===
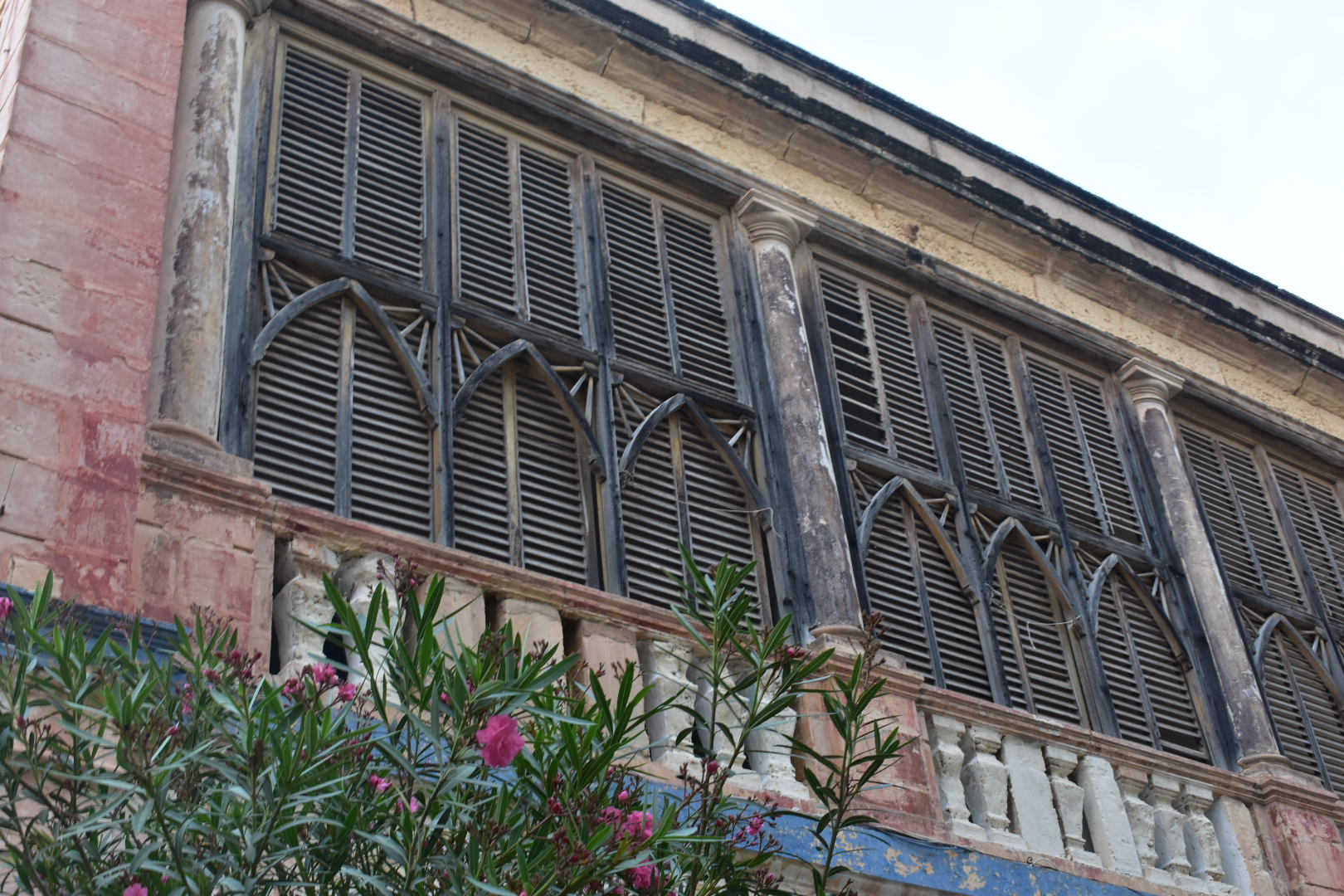
Pointed arched windows, a Neo-Gothic design

On 26 March 1872 the trustees sold the property to Dr Pasquale Mifsud (1833–1895), later a judge, and Carlo Maria Muscat, merchant and member of the Council of Government, for the sum of £2,200.

They invited the Society of Jesus to open a Roman Catholic college in the building. The Colonial Office approved this move in 1877, and the Jesuits added an extension and end-wing to the building. John Morris was the first Rector between 1877 and 1878. A church, dedicated to Saint Ignatius of Loyola, was completed adjacent to the villa in 1881. St Ignatius' College became one of the leading schools in Malta, and within a few years after its opening it became a boarding school. A refectory, dormitories, a gymnasium, study halls, laboratories and sports facilities were located within the villa and on its grounds. It notably was used as the meteorological centre for the Maltese Islands from 1883 until 1906. The lecturers of the college were generally Catholic priests and their students were generally of the privileged class.

Notable students include Hannibal P. Scicluna. The college closed down in July 1907 and remained vacant. Soon afterwards, the Jesuits opened the St Aloysius' College in Birkirkara, on 22 December 1907, which had been already built since 1896.

=== St Ignatius Hospital ===
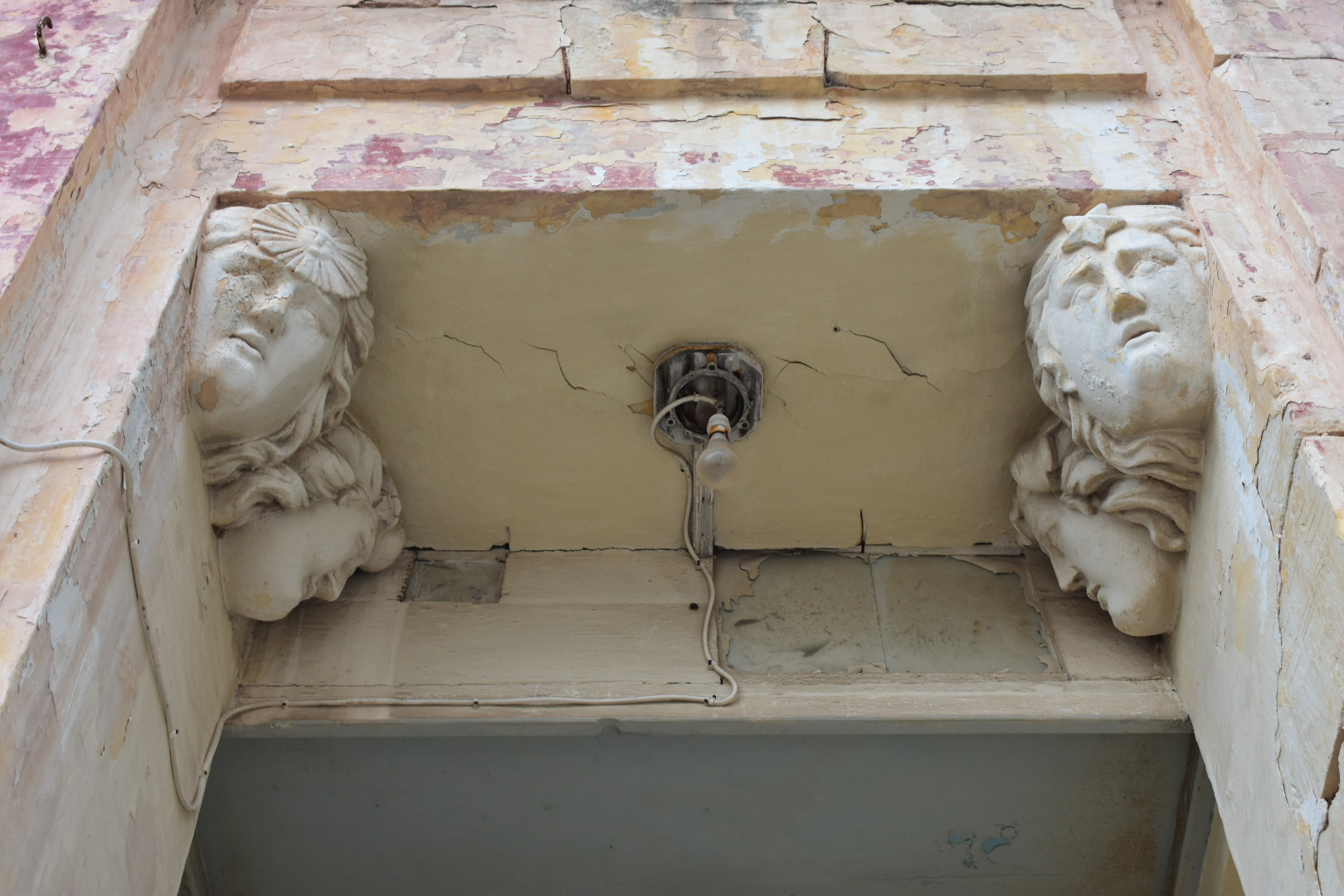
Details of sculpture

In 1915, the former college was converted to a military hospital known as St. Ignatius Hospital. The hospital was considered small and probably gave better service than other hospitals of the time, in terms of commodity, but this opinion may be subjective. It housed recovering soldiers who had been wounded in World War I, and it originally included 155 beds, an operating theatre and an X-ray room. The first patients arrived on 2 July 1915. Soldiers who arrived there were sometimes seriously wounded from battlefields, and at times succumbed to injuries. Musicians were occasionally sent to alleviate the clients of the hospital and their visitors.

=== St Ignatius Hospice ===
In 1917 the building's use was changed to a hospice for patients with mental illness. At this point, it was adapted to accommodate nearly 200 men. It closed down in January 1919 following the end of the war.

=== Home for Russian refugees ===
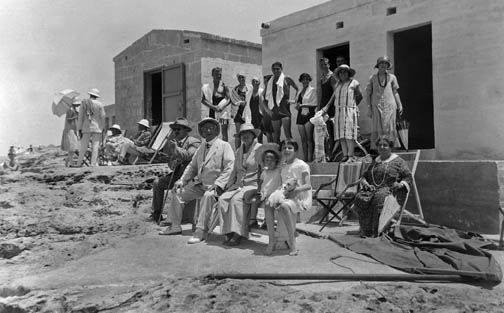
The photo by Richard Ellis may possibly portray some of the Russian refugees

The building eventually housed several Russian refugees fleeing the Russian Revolution. These Russians lived in exile from their homeland and their status gave the area a name as still known today, “The Exiles”.

At this point the building was painted by the Russian Nikolay Petrovich Krasnov. Krasnov left Malta with his family roughly three years after arriving. He and his team of architects and artists left a patrimony of watercolour paintings of Malta portraying how it used to be at the time. The paintings of Malta generally consisted of postcards. While in Malta, Krasnov taught art lectures as his main activity.

Boris Edwards was another Russian refugee who lived at the villa before moving to Birkirkara for health purposes. While in Malta, Boris left a legacy of public monuments such as the Addolorata Cemetery Sette Giugno monument.

Most Russian refugees were in Malta only between 1919 and 1922.

=== Division of building and gardens ===
The building was then divided into tenements and sold off as housing units. Most of its grounds were also sold, part of which were built up as the Balluta Buildings in the 1920s. In the 1930s, the villa also housed the Melita Football Club. By the 1970s, the entire area had been built up with numerous apartment blocks, and the villa was no longer visible from the bay.

=== Partial demolition ===
In June 2017, a court order was issued which allowed the removal of some dangerous structures and other works at the building. All works were to be supervised by a court-nominated architect. In July, the architect Stephan Vancell submitted a request to the Planning Authority to demolish an entire wing of the building, including the dangerous structures which were broken xorok (roof slabs) which could easily be replaced.

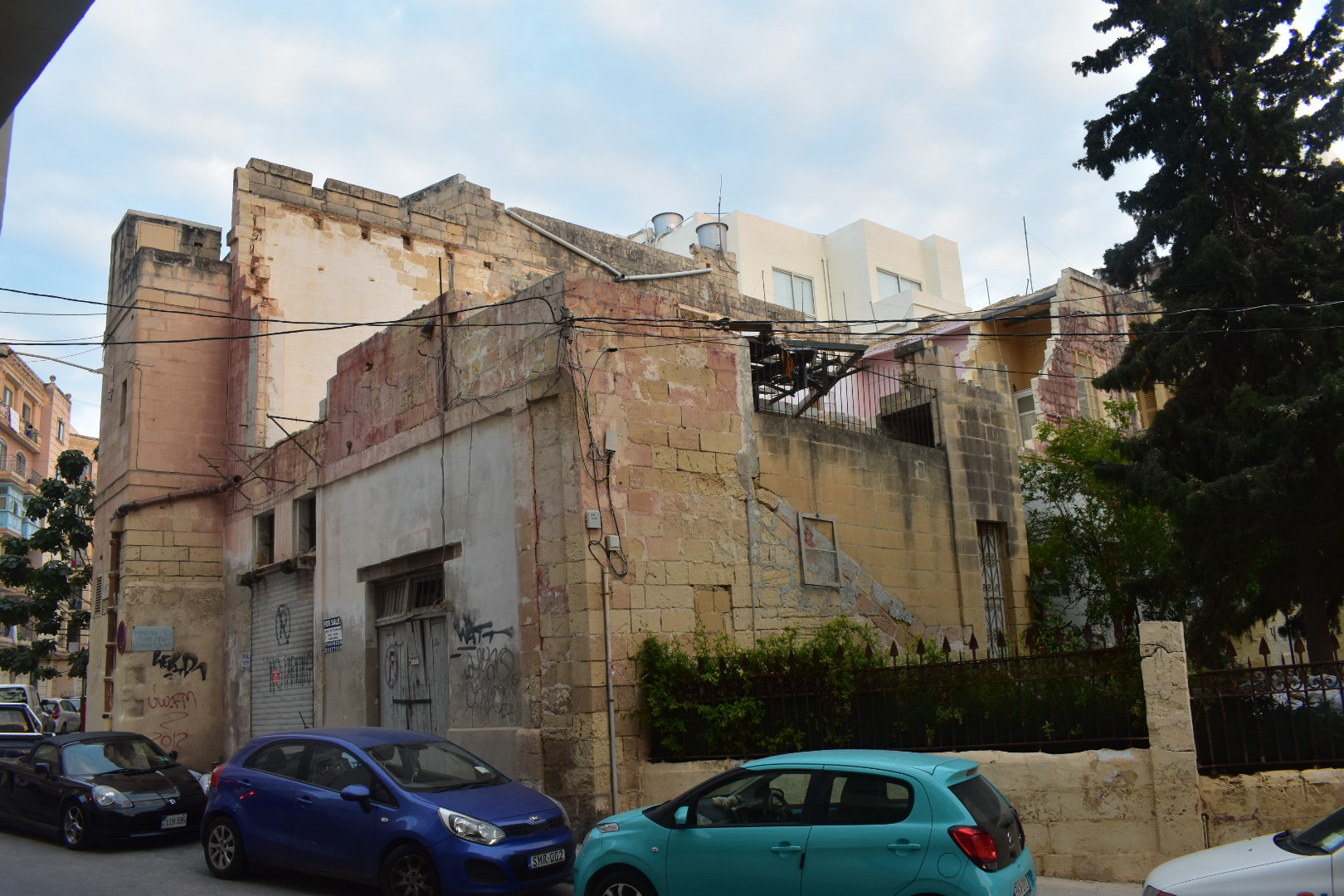
Partial demolition of the villa

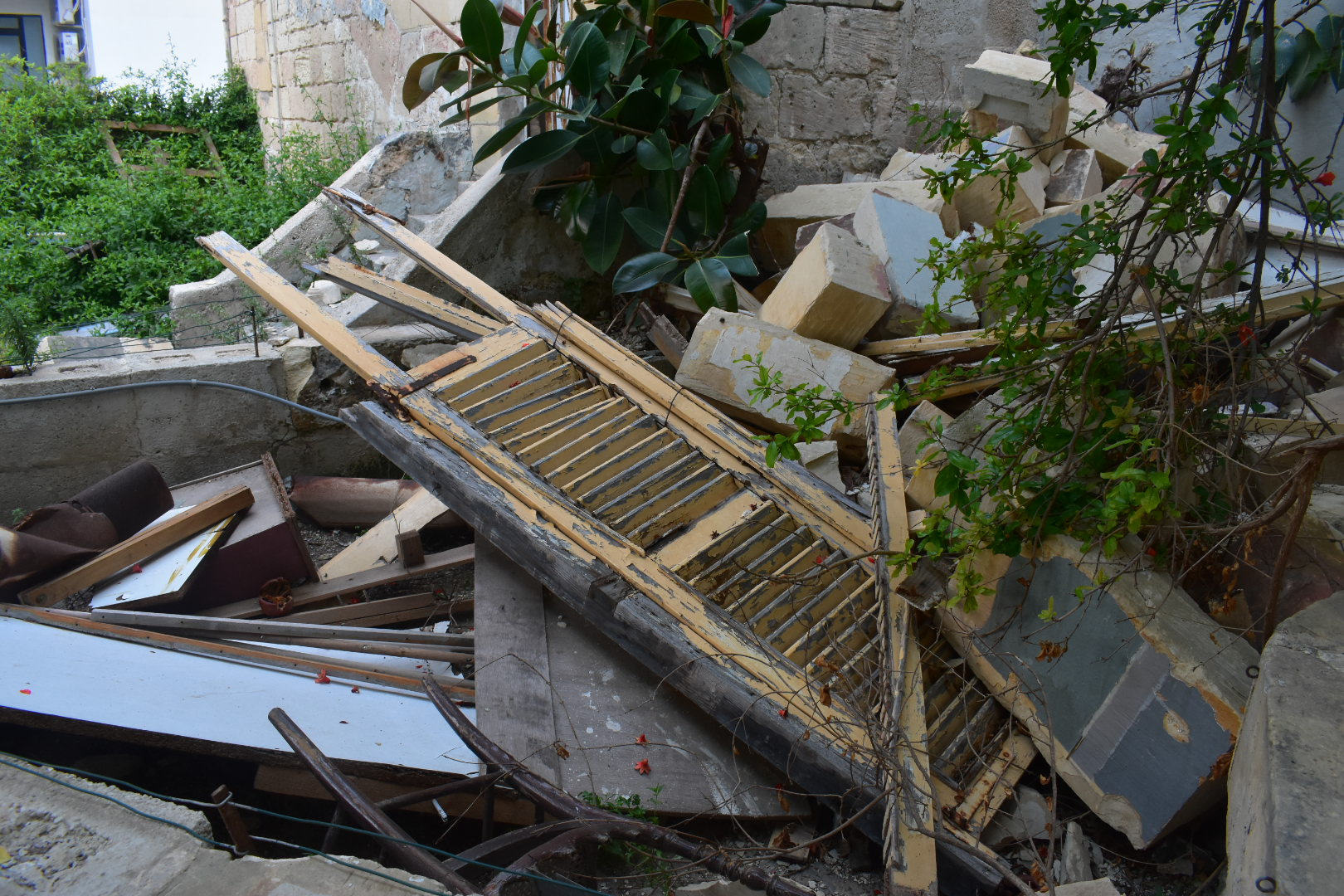
Remains of the balcony in situ

On 29 November 2017, the NGO Din l-Art Ħelwa and some residents submitted an application for the building to be scheduled. A report detailing the building's history and architectural significance was carried out with this goal in mind. A couple of days later, on 2 December, demolition work began on part of the building. Workers were told to leave the site by a Planning Authority official, but they returned and resumed their work once the official left. Demolition continued two days later, when the distinctive street-facing balcony was destroyed. The parts of the building which have been demolished were not part of the original villa but part of the extension built in the 1870s. The demolition works were condemned by the Democratic Party, while Din l-Art Ħelwa, Flimkien għal Ambjent Aħjar, the Chamber of Architects and the Sliema Heritage Society expressed concern at the works. The Interdiocesan Environmental Commission expressed its disappointment at the demolition. The work done was entirely illegal.

The Planning Authority turned down the application to schedule the building on 11 January 2018. On 17 February, Din l-Art Ħelwa requested that the courts rule if contempt of court proceedings were to be taken against the Planning Authority and the developers responsible for the demolition. On 11 April, the developer responsible for the partial demolition, Paul Gauci, applied to demolish the entire villa in order to create a public square. On 20 April, the court ruled that the partial demolition violated the court order, and the Planning Authority enforcement chief, the developer and the architect might face fines or possible prison sentences if found guilty. In usual cases where law is enforced, the Planning Authority can order the rebuilding of a demolished structure. However, there is no sign that this will happen in the case of Villa Ignatius. This was later confirmed when the Planning Authority controversially allowed the same developer to clear off the demolished part of the building. The Superintendence has objected to the works carried out before and after court involvement.

== Architecture ==
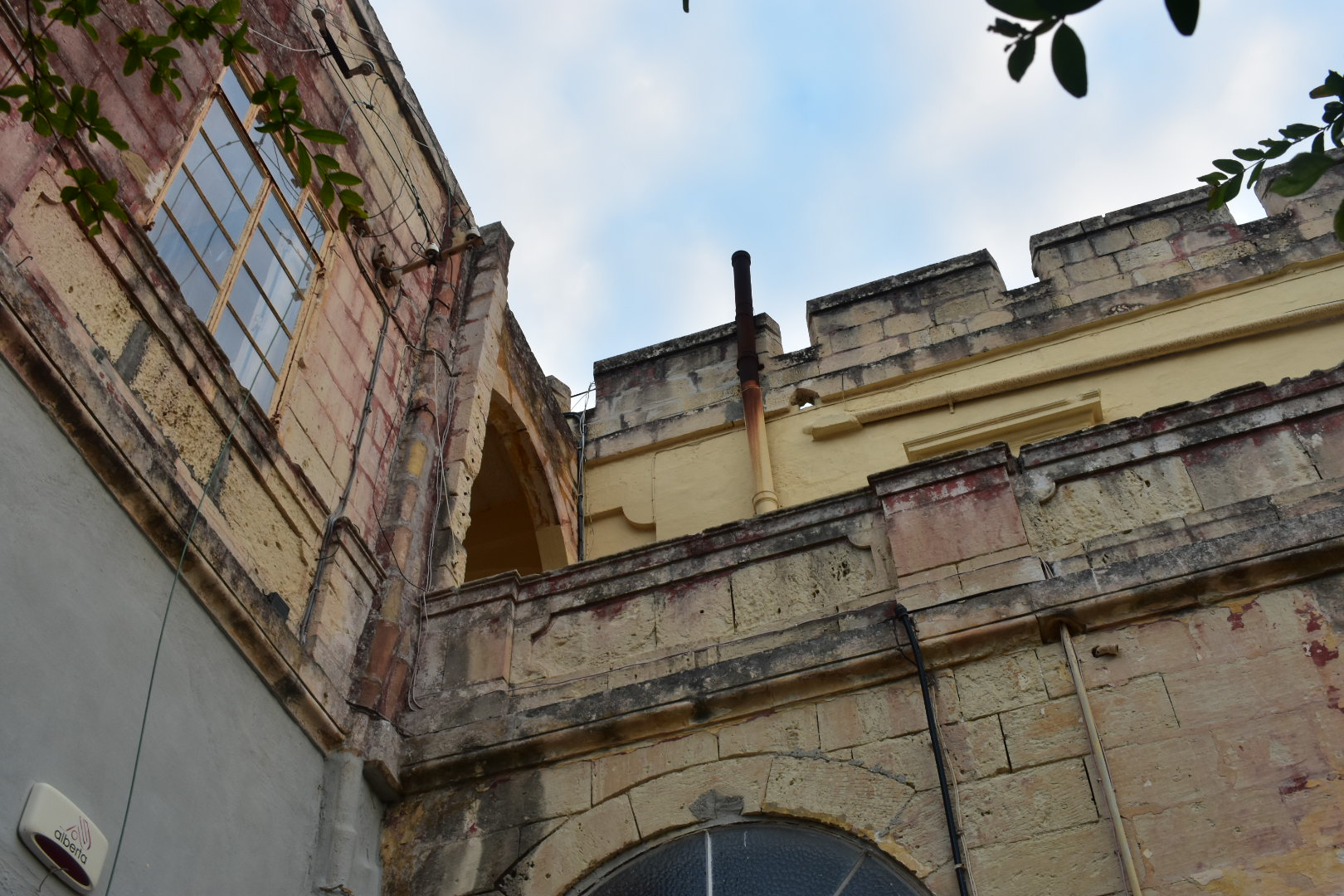
Crenelated rooftops and red ochre

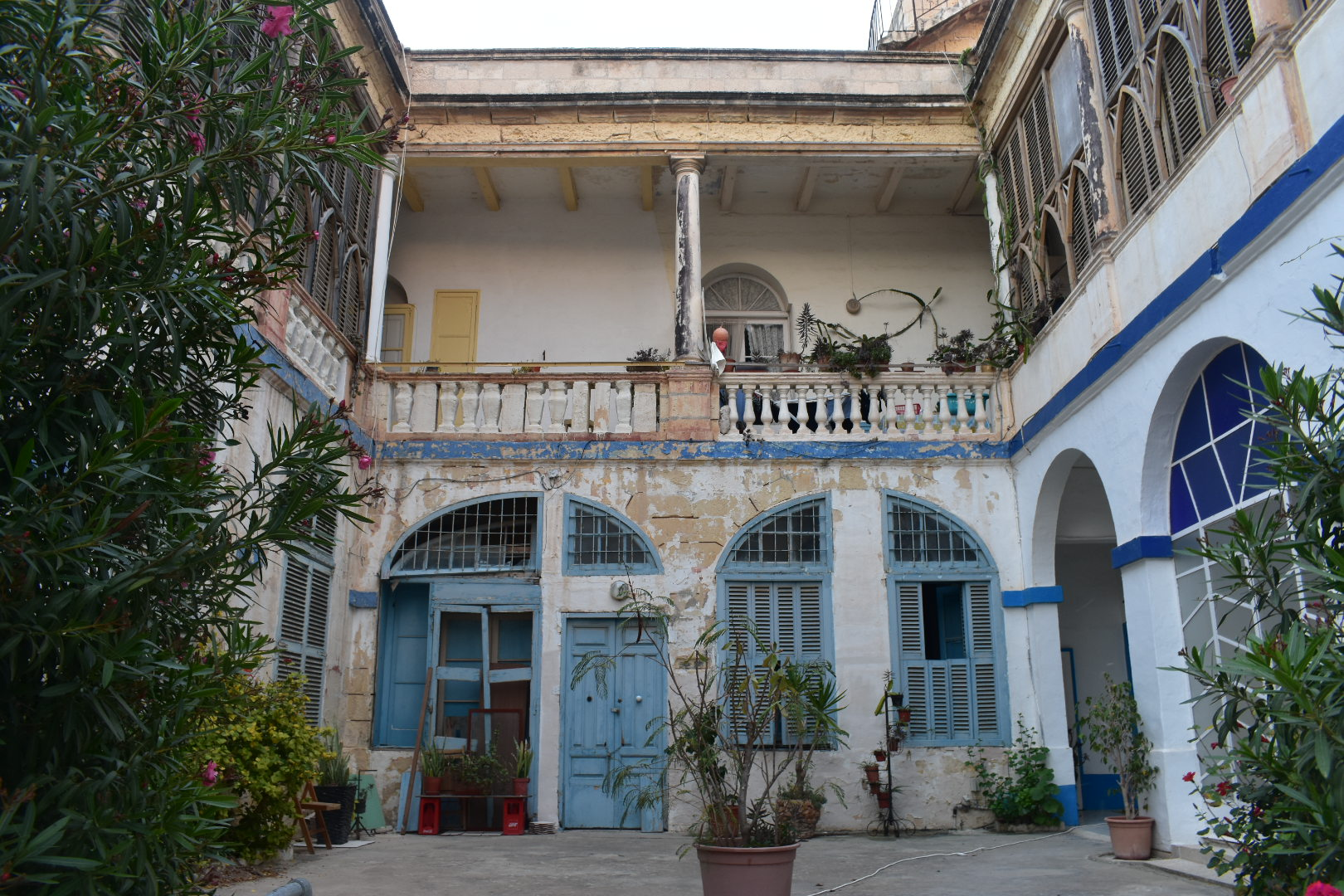
The main courtyard

Villa St Ignatius was one of the earliest, and possibly the first, buildings in Malta to display the Gothic Revival style. It includes crenelated rooftops and pointed Gothic-style arches. The street-facing forecourt included a louvered balcony, but this was demolished in 2017.

By the early 20th century, the building was painted in a distinctive red ochre (Maltese: demm tal-baqra) with white trims. Traces of this finish still survive on the building.

== See also ==
- Palazzo Fremaux, another heritage building which was controversially demolished between 1990 and 2003
- Sea Malta Building, which was partially demolished around the same time as Villa St Ignatius
- The Green House, Sliema, where permission to demolish a historic landmark was granted by the Planning Authority on condition to preserve elaborate features
- List of Jesuit sites
