= Sea Malta =

Maltese national shipping company

Sea Malta Company Limited
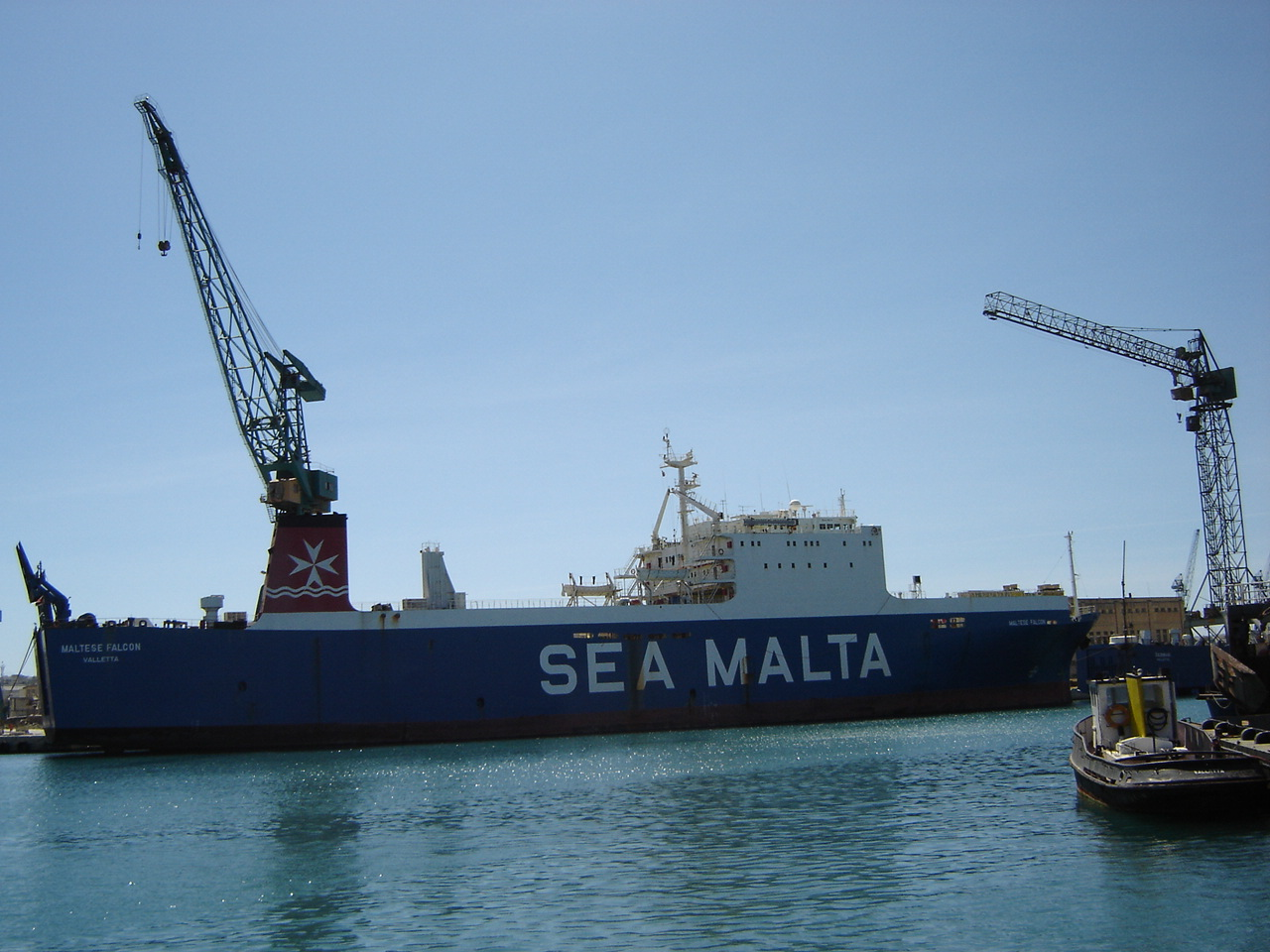
- Sea Malta's largest ship, the MV Maltese Falcon
- Company type: Limited
- Industry: Shipping
- Founded: 10 November 1973
- Defunct: 2006
- Fate: Liquidated
- Headquarters: Sea Malta Building, Marsa, Malta
- Area served: Malta, Europe, Tunisia, Italy

Sea Malta Company Limited (1973-2006) was the Maltese national shipping company. The goal of the company was to provide commercial maritime services company as well as to serve the needs of Maltese industry and the nation in general. The first ships to operate as part of Sea Malta were three old ships previously owned by the Maltese National Lines, the Marsa, Gudja and Mdina. The company was liquidated in 2006 after a failed privitization deal.

== History ==
Sea Malta was stablished on 10 November 1973 during the tenure of the Labour Government led by Dominic Mintoff. The government held the majority of the shares in the new company. In 1974, Sea Malta bought its first vessels, named Rabat and Zejtun.

The latter, although one of the most famous ships owned by the company, was quite unfortunate as in 1976 a bow replacement was needed after a collision with another ship near Capo Passero in Sicily whilst in 1978 while moored at Tunis, it heeled and had to be brought to Malta Drydocks for needed repairs.

The company continued to evolve and even invested in oil bunkering, insurance and shipping agency services. In 1973 the ship Tudor Prince capsized whilst outside the Harbour walls Grand Harbour. It was purchased by Sea Malta and following the completion of necessary repairs renamed as Bormla. In the same year the ship Dwejra was bought, however it was resold after a few months in December 1975. The three old ships Marsa, Gudja and Mdina were laid up in 1976 and in the same year, the company purchased the ship Qormi in order to provide better service to Europe. Another ship was bought in 1976 and named Dwejra II.

In 1979 Sea Malta also participated directly in the establishment of the national towing company, Tug Malta. In 1980 the Rabat was sold and in 1990 this ship met disaster as it sank near the English Channel with the loss of all her crew. In 1981, the head offices of Sea Malta were transferred from Floriana to the Sea Malta Building in Marsa where they remained until 2006. In 1985 the ship Zebbug was purchased following the selling of Bormla in 1984. The Zebbug replaced the Qormi on the Reggio route. In 1987 Sea Malta bought another ship synonymous with the company, the Pinto. Several other ships were acquired for a short period by Sea Malta including the Mosta (1986-1988) and the Kusi (1985-1987). By the mid-nineties, however, Sea Malta had only two ships, Zebbug and Pinto as the company sold off the Dwejra II in 1987 and the Qormi in 1987.

Yet, in 1996 the company purchased the largest ship until then the Senglea only to be re-sold after just a year. The Pinto was sold in 1998 and a year later its replacement was bought. This proved to be the last and largest ship ever owned by the company, the Maltese Falcon. For the last six years the company only operated the Zebbug on the Malta - Catania - Reggio route and the Maltese Falcon between Malta - Tunis - Genoa - Marseille. Since 2003, bad weather accumulated over the company as the Nationalist Government stated that it was making losses and thus being costly to the tax payers, albeit Sea Malta never took any subsidy.

=== Liquidation ===
In 2005 privatization negotiations failed and the Nationalist government declared the company bankrupt. Therefore, Sea Malta, one of the icons of Malta and which always served the nation, was liquidated. The ship Zebbug was sold to Fergun Lines and renamed Fehim Bey, still operating to Malta. The Maltese Falcon was purchased by Grimaldi Lines, keeping the same name and sailing until 2009 when it was scrapped in India. Sea Malta was undoubtedly an important asset to the Maltese economy and its closure was surely a disappointment for many Maltese sailors who for a number of years served on board with great satisfaction.
