= Palazzina Vincenti =

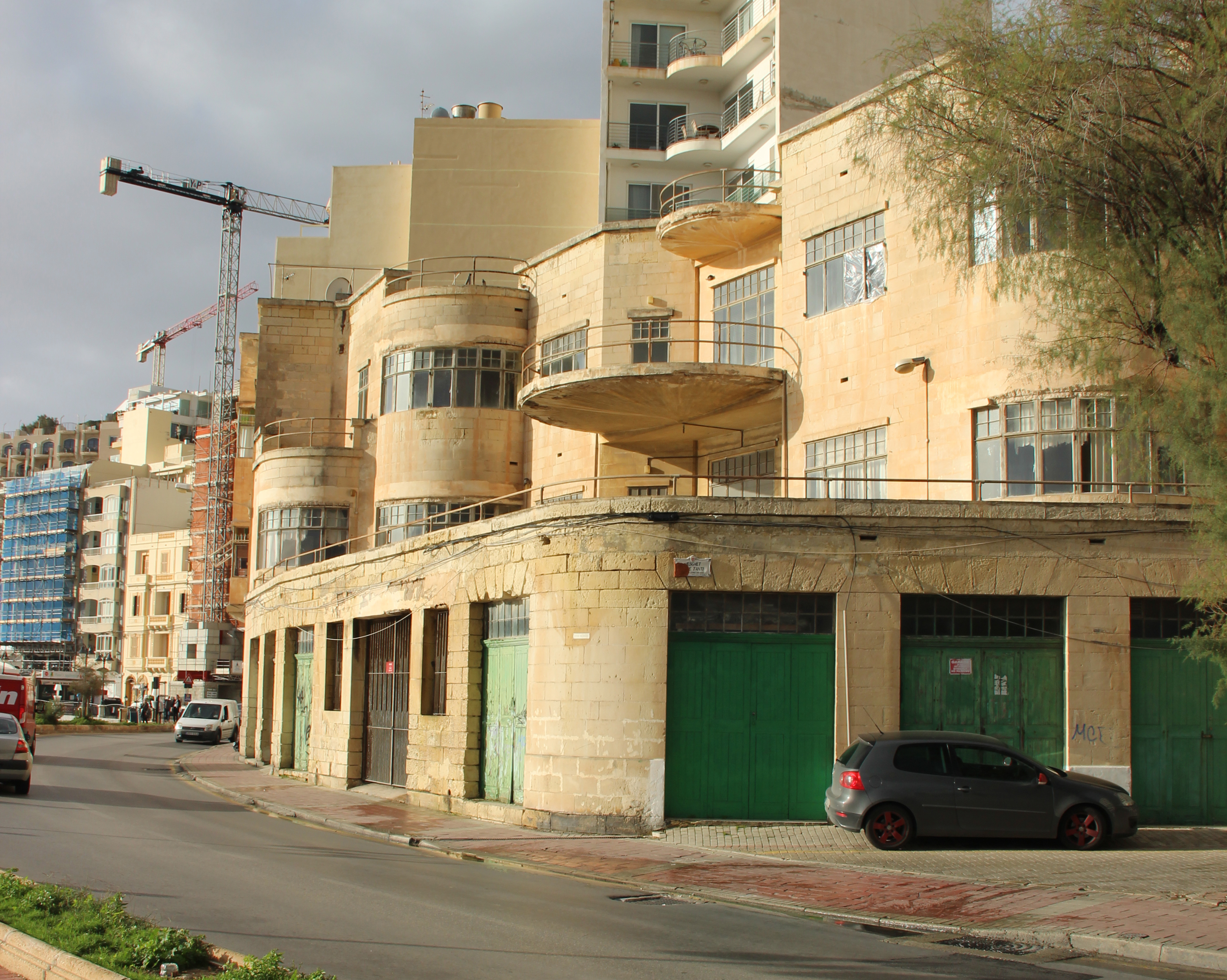
- Palazzina Vincenti in 2017

General information
- Status: Dilapidated
- Type: Residential
- Architectural style: Modernist
- Location: St Julian's, Malta
- Coordinates: 35°54′58.6″N 14°29′36.7″E
- Completed: 1948

Technical details
- Material: Limestone and concrete

Design and construction
- Architect(s): Gustavo R. Vincenti

Palazzina Vincenti is a residential building overlooking Balluta Bay in St Julian's, Malta. It was built in 1948 by architect Gustavo R. Vincenti as his own residence, and it is considered to be one of the best examples of Modernist architecture in its country. As of 2021, it is currently proposed that the building be demolished and replaced by a hotel. It has now been decided by the Planning Dept that it will be restored. (Ref Maltese news 21 Apr 2023)

== History ==
Palazzina Vincenti was designed by Gustavo R. Vincenti, a prominent Maltese architect, as his personal residence. It has been described as the epitome of his own architectural development, in which he embraced the Modernist style as opposed to Art Nouveau and Art Deco which had influenced his earlier works. It was constructed in 1948, and Vincenti lived in the building until his death in 1974. The architect's son, Hilaire Vincenti, subsequently lived there until his own death in 2019.

A request to schedule the building was submitted by architect Edward Said to the Planning Authority (PA) in 2019. By 2021 the property was split between several owners including the developer Carlo Stivala, and parts of the building were in a dilapidated state. In November 2021 it was reported that Stivala submitted an application to the PA to demolish the building and replace it with a 14-storey hotel designed by architect Robert Musumeci. Following this proposal, the Superintendence of Cultural Heritage, the AD+PD political party and other organisations and individuals including the mayor of St Julian's made numerous calls for preserving the building, citing its historical and architectural importance. On 17 December 2021, the PA issued an Emergency Conservation Order which granted it Grade 1 scheduling for a year.

== Architecture ==
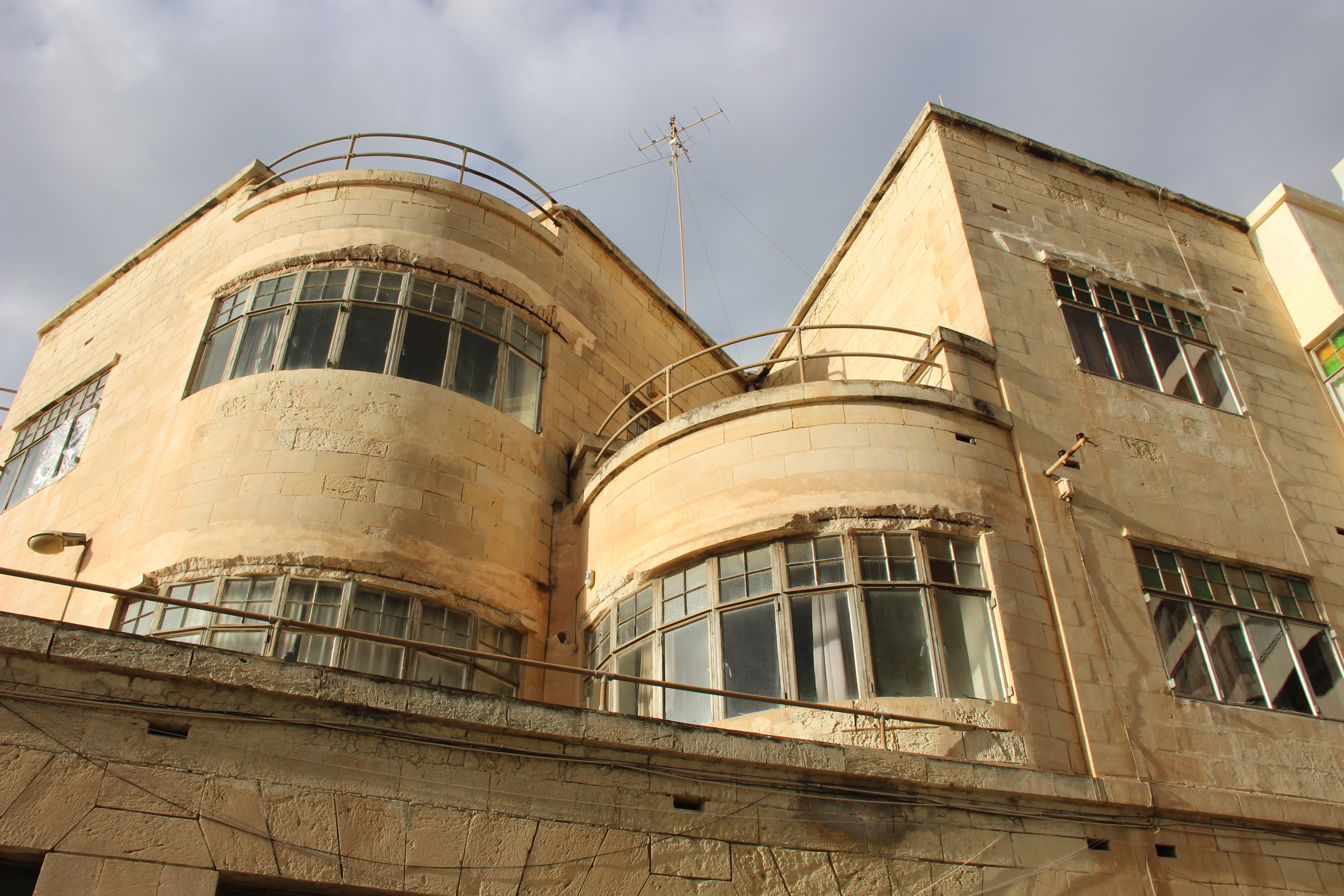
Long horizontal windows at Palazzina Vincenti

Palazzina Vincenti is one of the best examples of Modernist architecture in Malta, and it is one of the earliest residential buildings of this style in the country.

The building consists of a number of filleted cubic volumes built over a group of garages. The façades are characterised by plain limestone walls with long horizontal windows and cantilevered concrete balconies with austere steel railings. Internally, the residence includes a grand foyer, waffle slab ceilings and a prominent staircase built out of concrete.

The building also contains a tunnel which leads to the foreshore of Balluta Bay.

== See also ==
- Balluta Buildings, an Art Nouveau building located at the opposite end of Balluta Bay
