= Sea Malta Building =

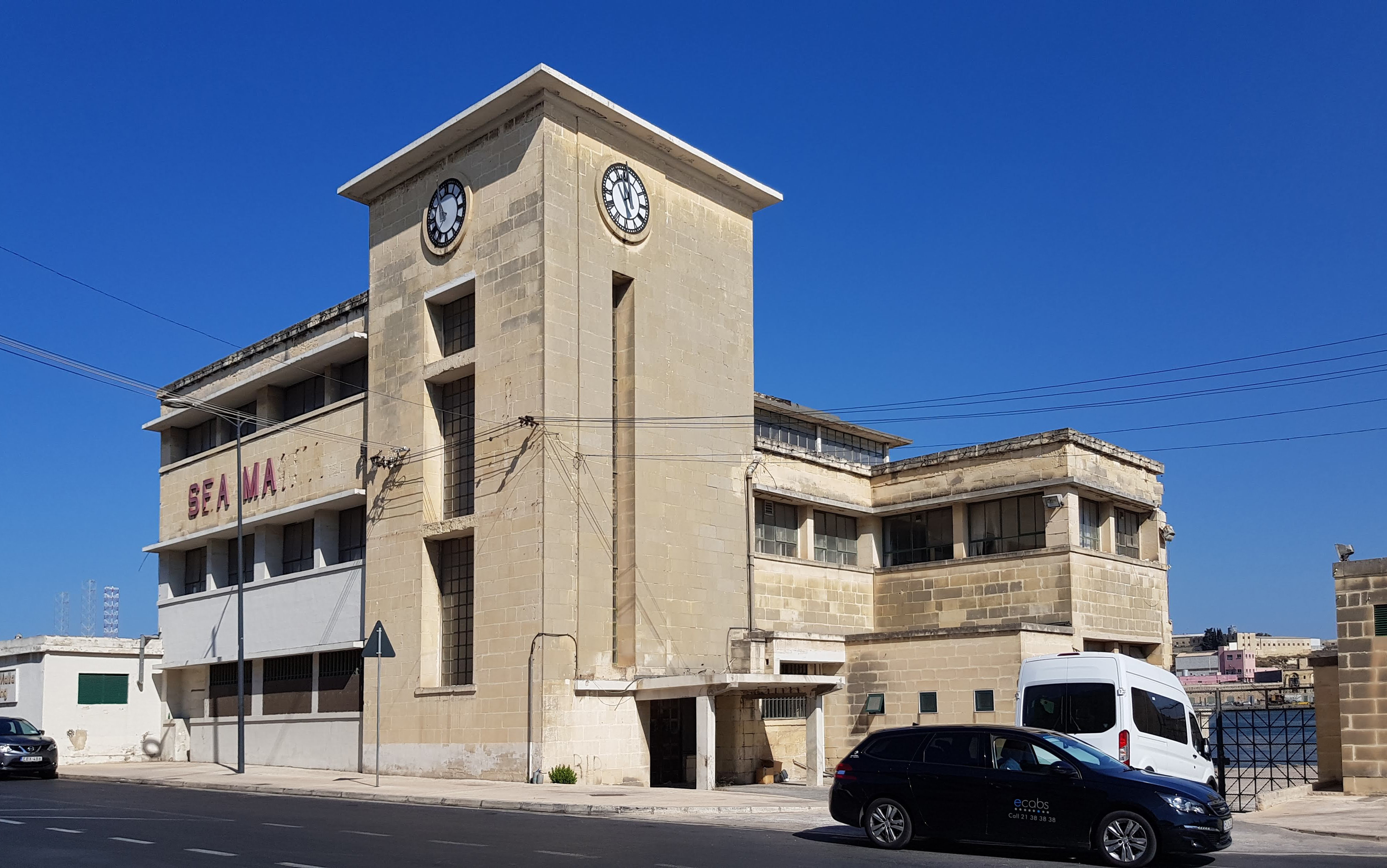
- The surviving part of the Sea Malta Building in 2018
- Interactive map of the Sea Malta Building area

General information
- Status: Partially intact
- Type: Warehouse, later offices
- Architectural style: Modernist
- Location: Flagstone Wharf, Marsa, Malta, HMR 12
- Coordinates: 35°53′7.3″N 14°30′1.1″E
- Completed: 1948
- Demolished: November 2017 (rear section)
- Client: Navy, Army and Air Force Institutes

Design and construction
- Architecture firm: Mortimer and de Giorgio Architects

The Sea Malta Building, formerly known as the NAAFI Building, is a former office building located in Marsa, Malta. It was originally built in 1948 as a warehouse and recreational facility for the British Navy, Army and Air Force Institutes (NAAFI). It was the head office of Sea Malta from 1981 to 2006, and it has been abandoned since then. Part of the building was demolished in November 2017 after it was found that its foundations were in a poor state.

== History ==
=== Background ===
The NAAFI (Navy, Army and Air Force Institutes) was present in Malta since 1919 and its introduction set a competitive impact to Maltese businessmen. A good number of Maltese workers benefitted as they were employed with the NAAFI. The NAAFI had initially occupied two stores at the Barriera Wharf (no. 13 and 14) outside the fortifications of Valletta (which stores were built by Grand Master Perellos for Maritime commerce) setting a business of an automobile garage. After almost three decades, the NAAFI moved out and the stores became occupied by a wine business set up by the A.M. & A. Cassar Brothers.

=== Purposely built building ===
The Sea Malta Building was originally built in 1949 for the NAAFI, and was initially known as the NAAFI Building. It was designed by the architecture firm Mortimer and de Giorgio Architects. The building served as a warehouse, but it also housed shops, restaurants and other recreational facilities. The building had a significant role in WWII when it served food to many people around the Grand Harbour area. The British Navy left Malta in March 1979 (Freedom) and hence the NAAFI vacated the building.

The building remained adequate for sea-related activity and thus was established to be used as a warehouse for ships. In April 1981, the building was converted into the head office of Sea Malta Company Limited, formerly the Sea Malta Groupage Bonds, who moved there from their previous offices in Floriana. It remained the company's headquarters until the company dissolved in 2006. Parts of the building were later used as a warehouse, while the rest of the block were abandoned and fell into a state of disrepair.

=== Partial demolition ===
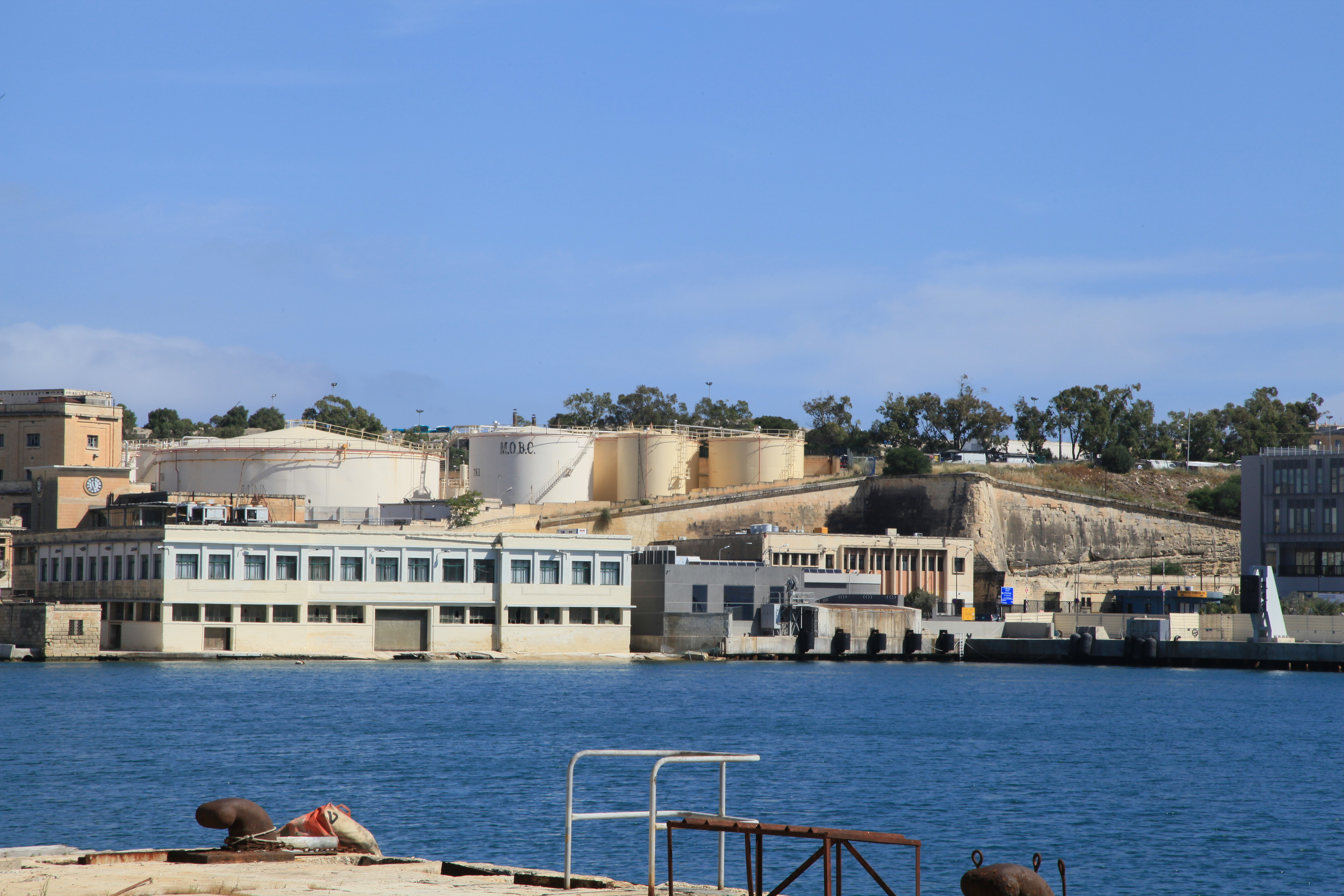
The Sea Malta Building (white building on the left) as seen from Bridge Wharf in 2014. The sea-facing section visible in this photo was demolished in 2017.

In 2017, it was found that part of the building's foundations were in a poor state as they were constructed on metal piles resting on the seabed, which were prone to erosion. The quay on which the building was constructed had already partially collapsed. A structural appraisal report stated that the building became an operational risk for the Grand Harbour. The Planning Authority approved the demolition of a large part of the building. The Chamber of Architects and the NGOs Din l-Art Ħelwa and Flimkien għal Ambjent Aħjar asked the Authority to nullify the permit awarded for the demolition, with the Chamber stating that the structural appraisal report did not identify the structure as in imminent danger of collapse.

The rear part of the building began to be demolished on 20 November 2017 by Enemalta contractors. The front end of the building, including the clock tower, is not in danger of collapse and will not be demolished.

== Architecture ==
The Sea Malta Building has been called "a fine modernist building". It includes a distinctive clock tower. The Planning Authority has mixed opinion about the building and hence sought for the conservation of the main features.

== See also ==
- Villa St Ignatius, which was controversially partially demolished around the same time as the Sea Malta Building
