= Gustavo R. Vincenti =

Maltese architect and developer (1888–1974)

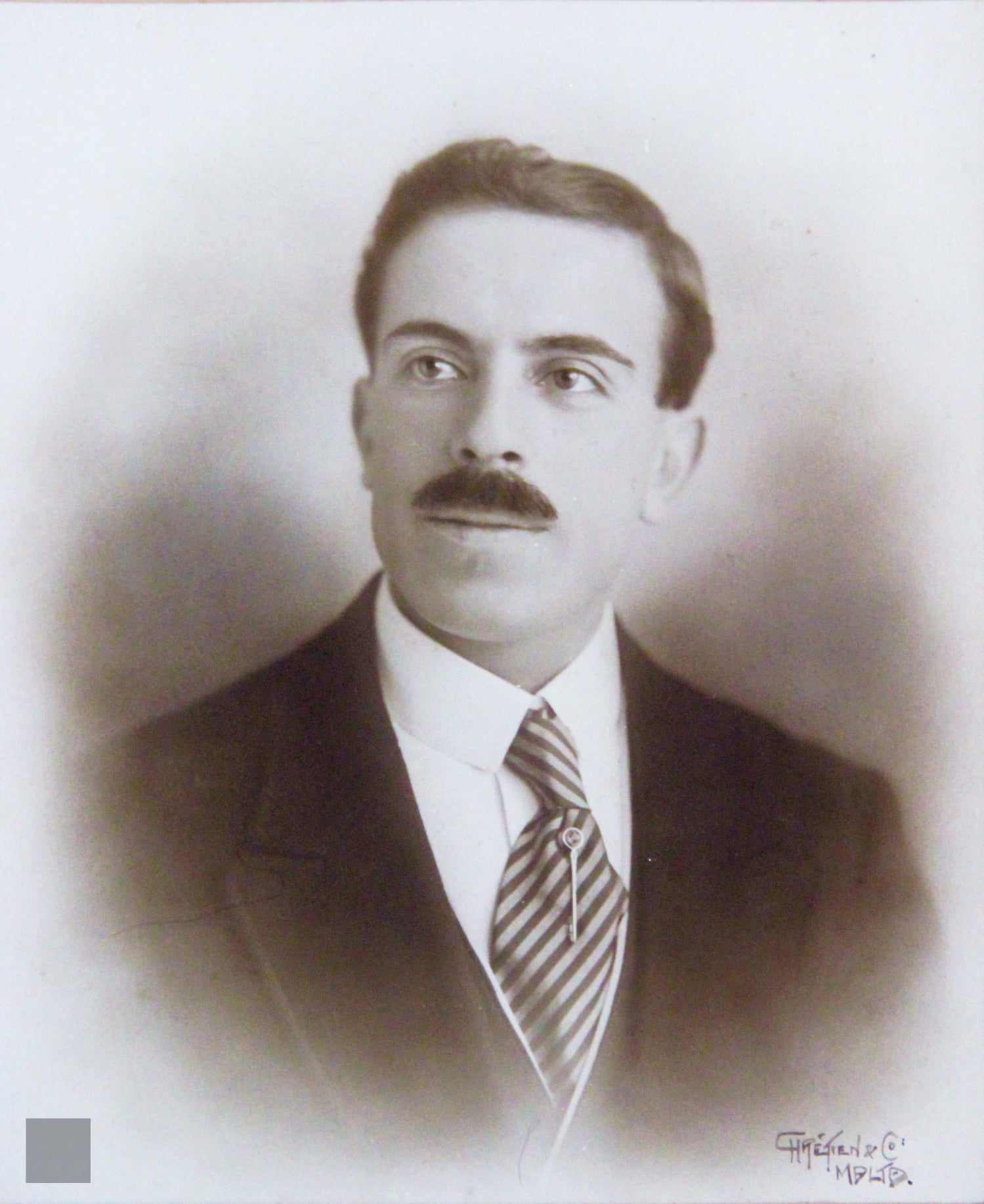
Gustavo Vincenti circa 1920

Gustavo Romeo Vincenti (26 August 1888 – 25 April 1974) was a Maltese architect and developer. Born into a wealthy and business-oriented family in Valletta and Floriana, he was able to purchase land and design and build buildings which he would then sell to clients. He was interested in architecture from a young age, and he graduated as an architect from the University of Malta in 1911, at the age of 23.

His early works show inspiration from Art Nouveau, Art Deco and eclecticism, interpreted in an economic but elegant way. His facades include horizontal and vertical elements which create a geometric and rigid feel to the buildings, while maintaining an element of flow. His early works include some terraced houses in Sliema, many of which still exist. Other buildings include the Italian embassy, an apartment block and some houses in the vicinity of the King George V Gardens in Floriana. His most significant project was the Vincenti Buildings in Valletta, a large block of apartments constructed in the 1930s occupying an entire city block on the site of the former Forni della Signoria.

Some of his buildings are more Modernist, showing influences from Le Corbusier. These include a complex of four houses in Ta' Xbiex built in 1936, collectively also known as Vincenti Buildings, with each of the houses being named after one of the Four Evangelists. Modernism is also evident in his personal villa, Palazzina Vincenti, in St Julian's, which was inhabited by his son Hilaire Vincenti, who died in 2019 at 92.

According to Edward Said, Vincenti

was a great exponent of Art Nouveau and Art Deco architecture in Malta. In the 1920s and 30s he purchased lands and built houses. Some of his best creations are on Dingli Street in an Italian Liberty style with floral frieze designs, such as the Art Deco double-fronted two-storey townhouse ‘Assisi’ with columned and fanlight entrance together with wooden balcony flanked by simply designed balcony railings. No 10 next door, is of particular interest and architectural uniqueness. Acrooss [sic] the road stands a row of distinctly Art Deco design which is immediately recognizable as being Vincenti, who engaged a geometrically pure and abstract form of ornamentation. service offices. Other designs were houses in Melita Street, Amery Street with art nouveau designs, and Napoleon Flats on Prince of Wales Road.

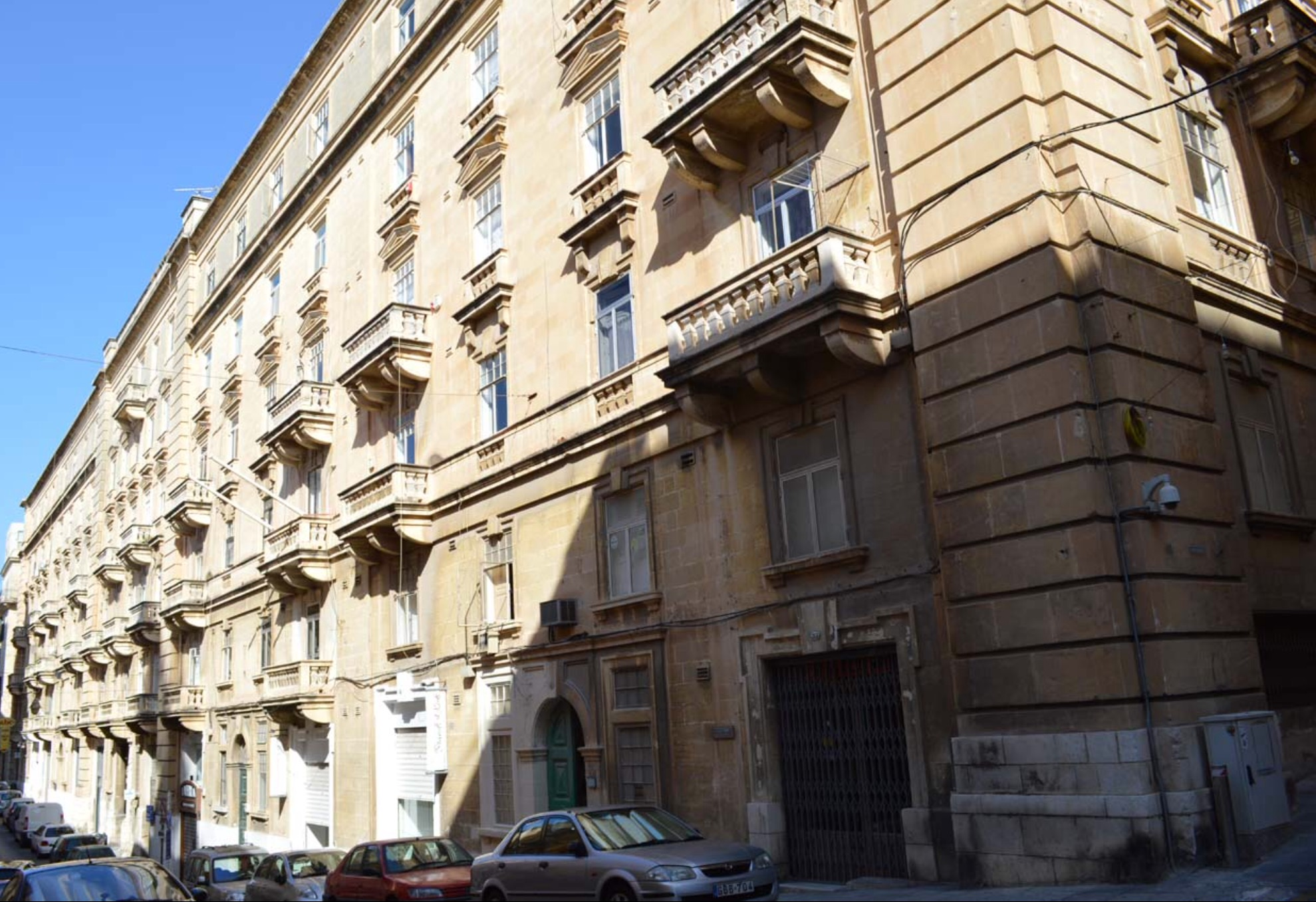
Vincenti Buildings in Valletta, built by Vincenti on the site of the Forni della Signoria

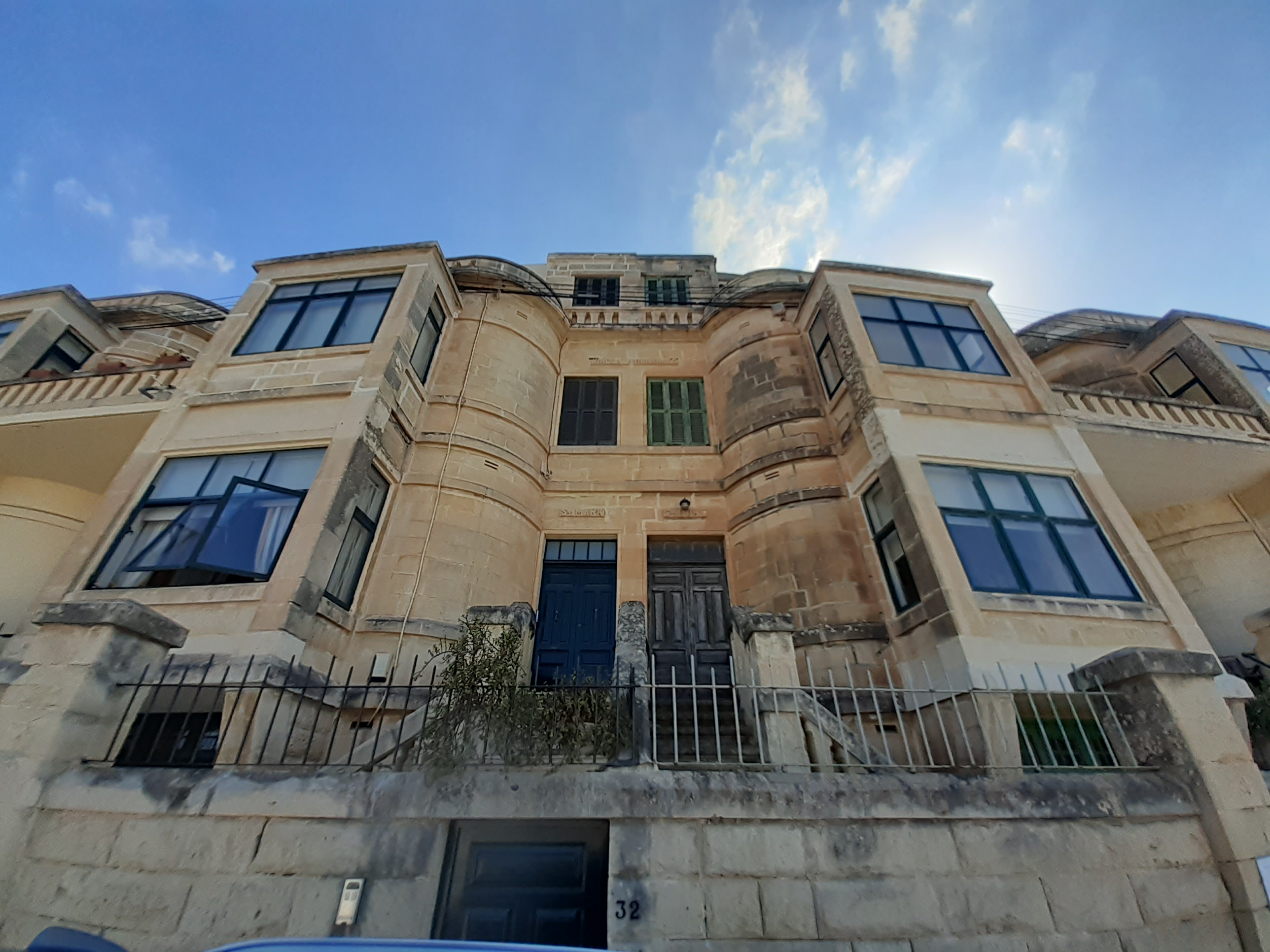
Vincenti Buildings in Ta' Xbiex (1936)

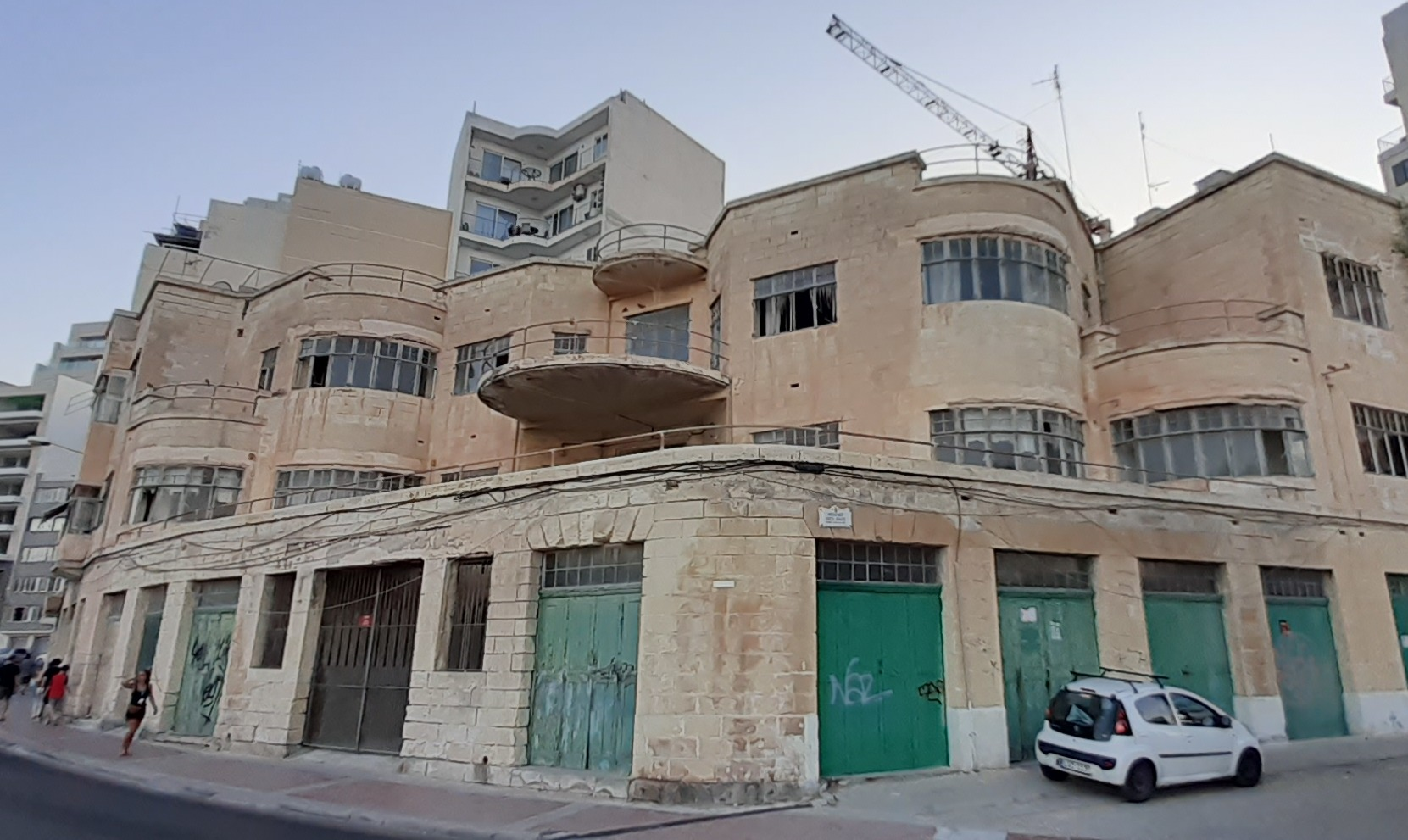
Palazzina Vincenti in Balluta Bay

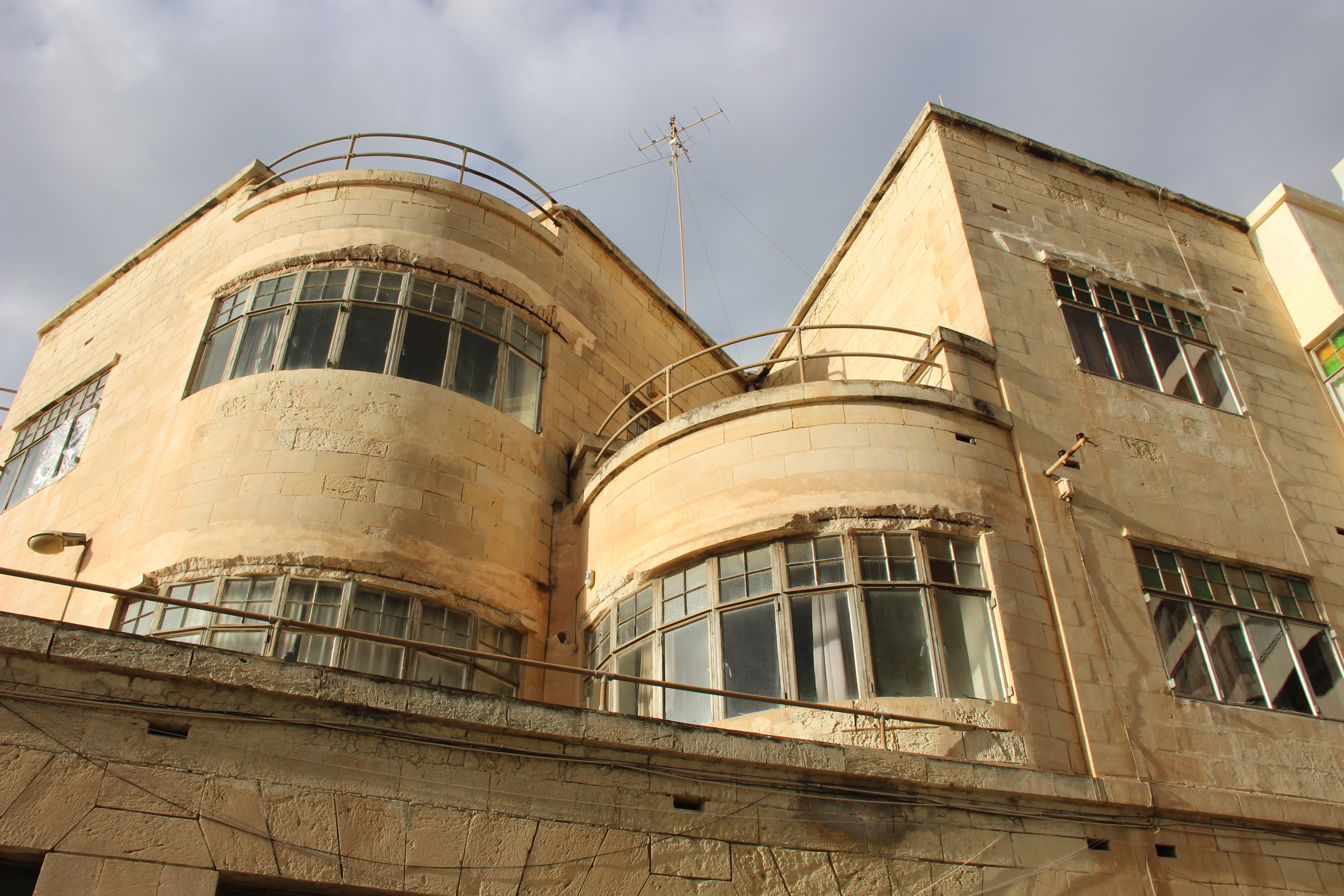
Palazzina Vincenti
