= Roger de Giorgio =

Maltese architect (1922–2016)

Roger de Giorgio (29 December 1922 – 5 February 2016) was a Maltese architect and a member of the Sovereign Military Order of Malta and the Royal Historic Society.

== Biography ==
De Giorgio was born in Milan and attended Carlo Pisacane School. He studied at the University of Malta and graduated as an architect and civil engineer in 1946.

De Giorgio was a senior partner of Mortimer and de Giorgio between 1948 and 1968, Mortimer, de Giorgio and Partners between 1968 and 1971, Malta Consult between 1972 and 1977 and Roger de Giorgio and Partners. He became an associate of the Royal Institute of British Architects in 1956, eventually being elected as a fellow in 1958.

Between 1969 and 1970, he was the Chairman of the Board of Governors of MCAST. De Giorgio was also a member of the Council of the University of Malta between 1969 and 1971.

Among many other buildings, in Malta, Mortimer and de Giorgio Architects designed and built the Sea Malta Building in 1948 and the Seminary at Tal-Virtù, completed in 1954, Santa Maria Estate in Mellieha, Barclays Bank branch and offices in Tripoli, 11 churches including the Madonna Ta Fatima church in Gwardamangia, Ta' L-ibragg Parish Church, Burmarrad Parish Church. The Mortimer and de Giorgio fund was set up in the firm's honour.

Mortimer and de Giorgio had offices in Benghazi and Tripoli where they designed and built schools and hospitals.

Isabelle Barratt-Delia, the first recorded Maltese female architect, who graduated in November 1961, worked at Mortimer and de Giorgio Architects.

De Giorgio was responsible for the restoration of a number of architecturally significant buildings in Valletta such as parts of St John's Co-Cathedral, the Archbishop's Palace and Saint John's Cavalier.

In 1957, de Giorgio joined the Order of Malta as a Donat of Devotion. He rose in rankings to become a Knight Grand Cross of Magistral Grace in Obedience with Sash. de Giorgio was the President of the Maltese Association of the Sovereign Military Order of Malta for 14 years between 1986 and 2000, during which time, among various projects undertaken he led the construction of the Malta Association's Headquarters at Casa Lanfreducci in Valletta. De Giorgio also led the organising committee for the celebrations held in Malta to mark the 900th anniversary of the foundation of the order.

De Giorgio died on 5 February 2016 in Malta.

== Personal life ==
De Giorgio had a wife named Marica and five children.

== Publications ==
- De Giorgio, Roger. A City by an Order. Malta, 1985.
