= Joseph M. Spiteri =

Maltese architect (1934–2013)

Joseph M. Spiteri or Joe Spiteri (1934–2013) was a Maltese architect.

Spiteri graduated from the University of Malta in 1958. From 1956 to 1975, he worked as an architect in the Public Works Department, and later as Senior Architect with MaltConsult. In 1979 he joined the University of Malta's Department of Architecture and Civil Engineering, where he taught architectural design until 2002.

== Commentary ==
According to Conrad Thake, Spiteri "was one of Malta’s leading postwar architects who was instrumental in promoting modernism in an era when modern architecture was still viewed with suspicion if not outright derision." He "was a strong believer in sketching and drawing, as a means of communicating ideas, and a skilled water colourist", driven by a "passionate concern with the built environment".

Perit Joe Spiteri was one of Malta’s leading postwar architects who was instrumental in promoting modernism in an era when modern architecture was still viewed with suspicion if not outright derision. His main architectural works ranging from his Corbusian-style house on pilotis at Ta' Xbiex, the spiritually-uplifting Balluta parish church, the dignified John F. Kennedy memorial at Qawra, and the urban planning of the Santa Lucija housing estate are all testimony to his wide-ranging talent in architectural design and urban planning.

== Works ==
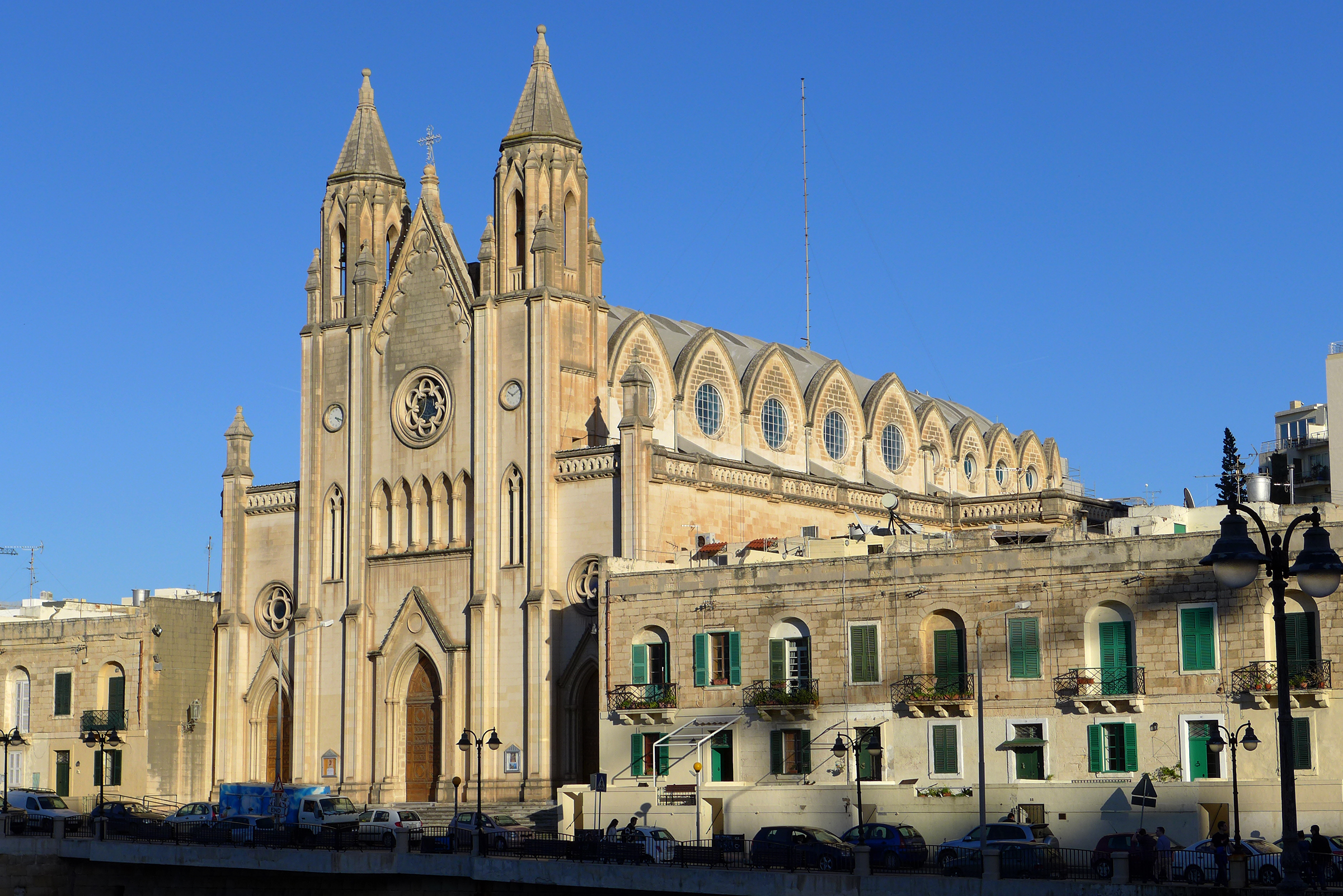
Carmelite Church, Balluta

- towers at Qawra Point,
- John F. Kennedy memorial at Qawra
- new town at Santa Lucija
- Carmelite Church, Balluta
- Villa Spiteri at Ta' Xbiex

== Bibliography ==
- Joseph M Spiteri - A Maltese architect and his work

== See also ==
- Stephen C. Spiteri, his son
