= Carmelite Church, Balluta =

Parish Church of Our Lady of Mount Carmel
- Il-Knisja Parrokjali tal-Madonna tal-Karmnu
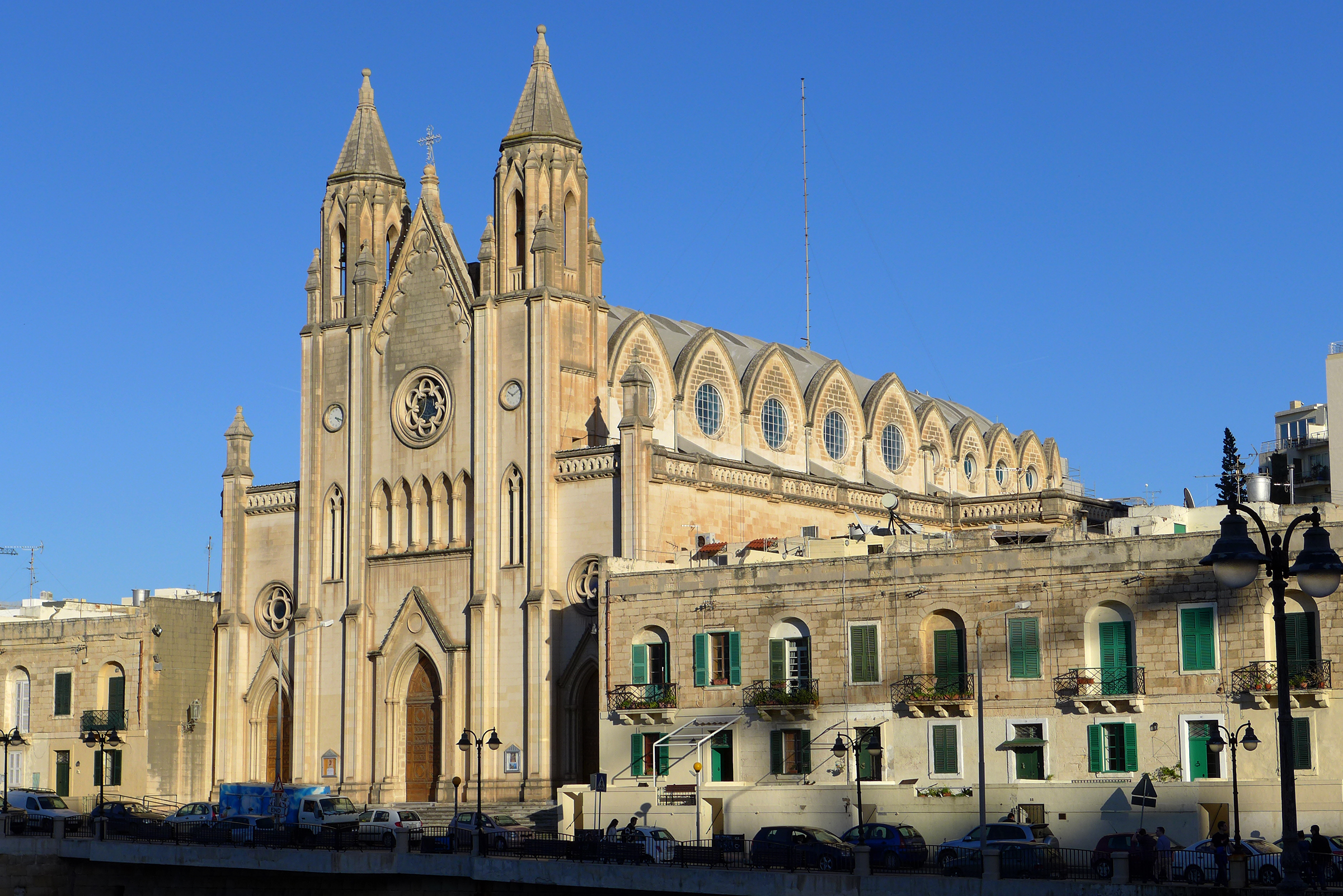
- The church in 2014
- Parish Church of Our Lady of Mount Carmel
- 35°54′52.7″N 14°29′42.0″E
- Location: St Julian's, Malta
- Denomination: Roman Catholic

History
- Status: Active
- Founded: 1859
- Dedication: Our Lady of Mount Carmel
- Dedicated: 12 December 1984

Architecture
- Functional status: Parish church
- Architectural type: Church
- Style: Neo-gothic
- Completed: 1958

Administration
- Archdiocese: Malta
- Parish: Balluta Bay

The Parish Church of Our Lady of Mount Carmel, or simply known as the Carmelite Church or Balluta Parish Church, is a neo-gothic Roman Catholic parish church located in Balluta Bay in the town of St Julian's, Malta.

== History ==
The present church, which is a prominent landmark in St Julians, dates from the early to the mid 20th century. The original Carmelite church was a small neo-gothic chapel which was built in 1859 on plans by Giuseppe Bonavia. The church was rebuilt in 1877 on plans by Emanuele Luigi Galizia. Afterwards it was handed over to the Carmelite friars who rebuilt it again in 1900 on plans by architect Gustavo R. Vincenti. After his death Joseph M. Spiteri took over. The church was then enlarged in 1958. In 1974, the area around the church was created into a parish, separate from the parish of St Julians, and the Carmelite church was chosen as the parish church. The church was dedicated on 12 December 1984.
