= Balluta Bay =

Bay on the northeast coast of Malta

- Bajja tal-Balluta
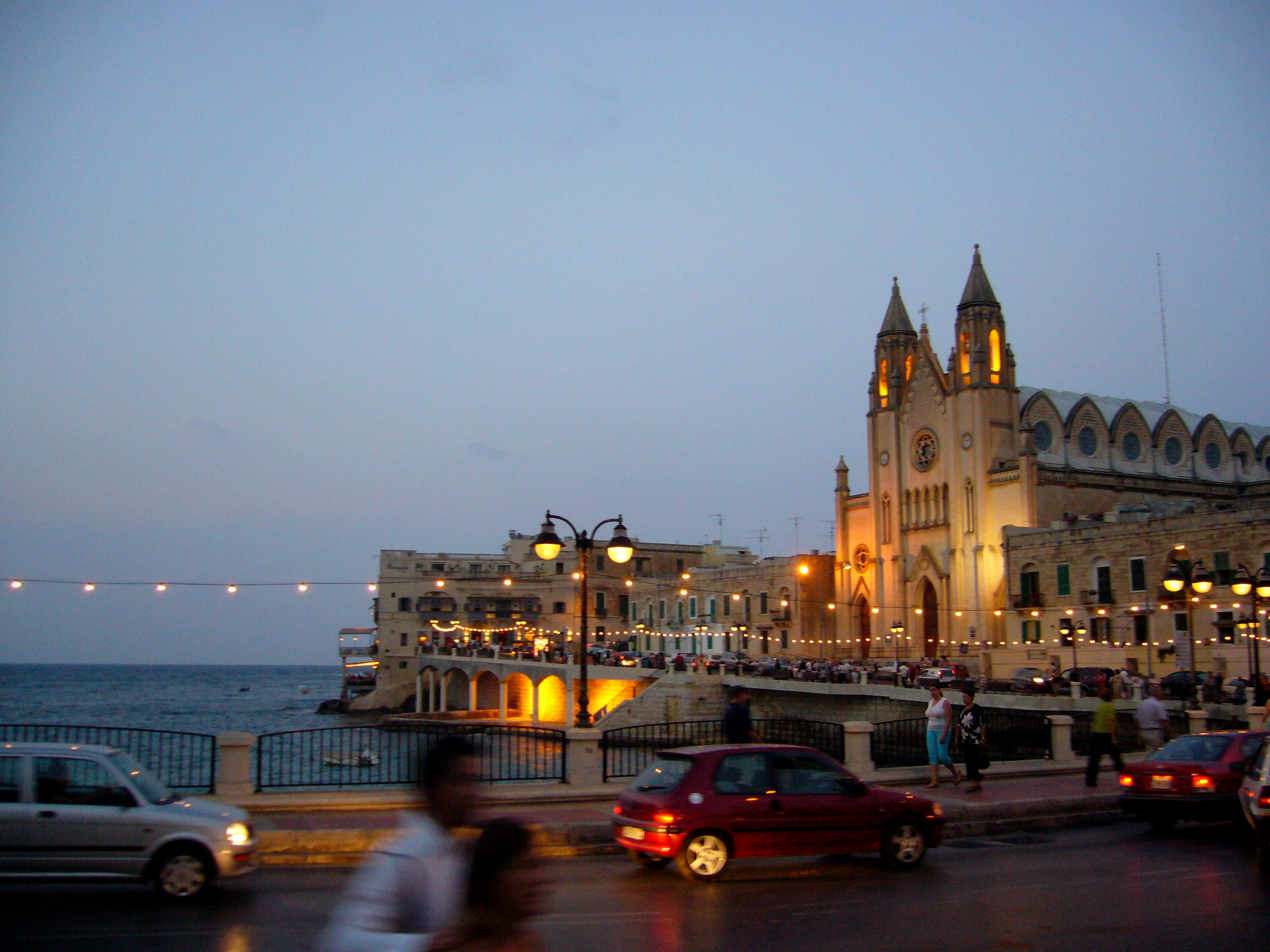
- Balluta Bay area

- Location of the bay in Malta
- Location: San Ġiljan, Malta
- Group: Mediterranean Sea
- Coordinates: 35.915°N 14.494°E
- Type: Bay
- Basin countries: Malta
- Surface elevation: 0 metres (0 ft)

Balluta Bay (Maltese: Bajja tal-Balluta, lit. 'Oak tree Bay'), is a bay on the northeast coast of Malta within St. Julian's. It is a popular recreation spot used for swimming, diving, and water sports, with a triangular pjazza surrounded by cafés and shaded by Judas trees. Its skyline is dominated by the neo-gothic Carmelite Parish Church and the Art Nouveau Balluta Buildings, which are apartment buildings on the eastern shore, as well as a cluster of terraced townhouses in the local variant of Georgian-style architecture. The south shore of Balluta Bay features Le Méridien St. Julian's Hotel, built on the grounds surrounding the 18th-century Villa Cassar Torregiani.

In 2024 the bay was closed from May to August due to contamination from sewage seepage.

== History ==
Balluta bay history is mainly turning from a small fishing area, valley and bay to becoming a bustling and very busy zone in San Ġiljan.

The history of balluta is marked by the development of Balluta Bay, the construction of iconic landmarks like the Balluta Buildings and the building of the Carmelite Church, and its transformation into a bustling area.

In the summer of 2018 a project had started to add sand to the beach, but sadly in 2019 most of the sand added was washed away because of a very strong storm so another project immediately started to add the sand again.

== Notable Sites ==
- Balluta Bay Beach
- Balluta Buildings
- Balluta Square
- Our Lady of Mount Carmel
- Palazzina Vincenti
- Villa St Ignatius
- Wied il-balluta (Balluta Valley)
