= Fleur-de-Lys, Malta =

Fleur-de-Lys Fleur-de-Lis
- Administrative committee
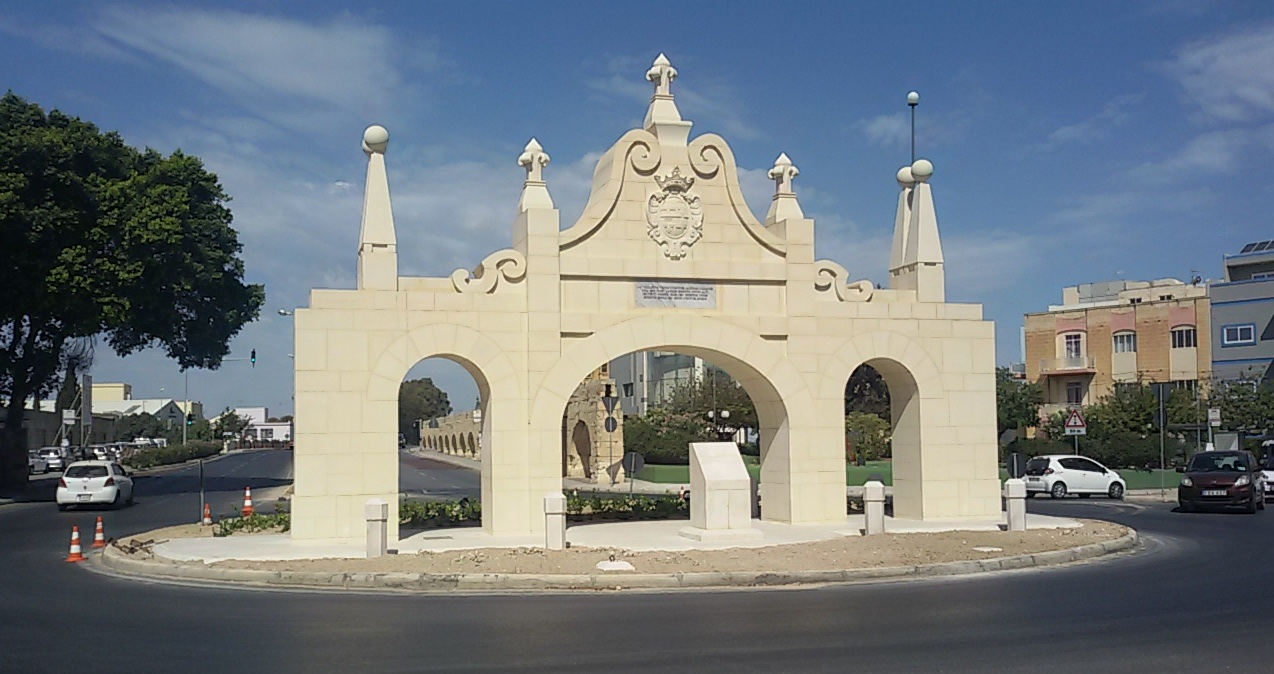
- Fleur-de-Lys Gate

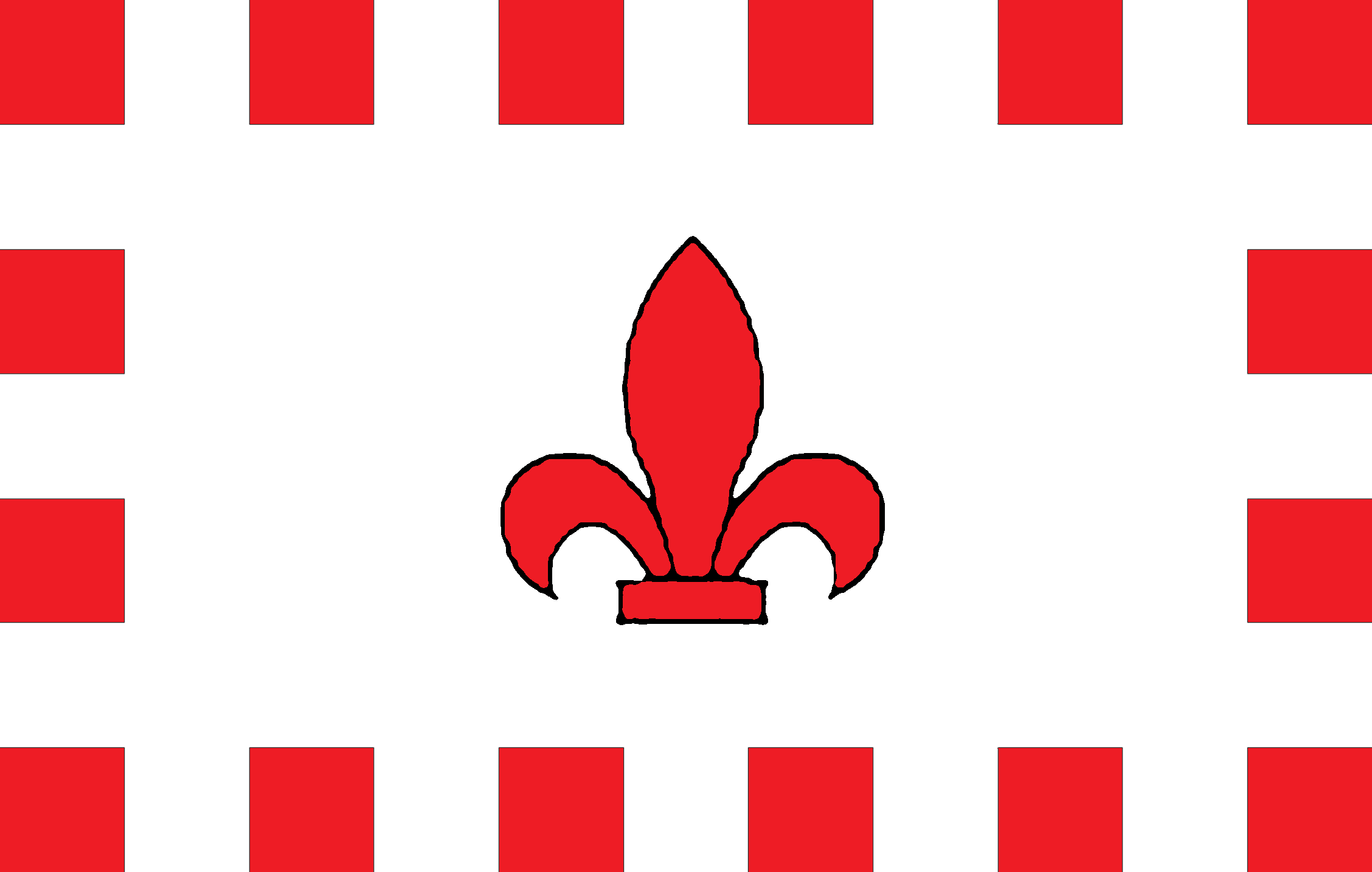
- Flag Coat of arms

- Location within Malta
- Coordinates: 35°53′29″N 14°28′19″E
- Country: Malta
- Region: Central Region
- District: Northern Harbour District
- Local council: Birkirkara
- Borders: Birkirkara, Santa Venera, Qormi

Government
  - Chairperson: Ronald Briffa (PN)
- Demonym: Furdulisjani
- Time zone: UTC+1 (CET)
  - Summer (DST): UTC+2 (CEST)
- Postal code: BKR
- Dialing code: 356
- Patron saint: Our Lady of Mount Carmel
- Day of festa: 5 July
- Website: fleurdelys.org.mt (archived)

Fleur-de-Lys is a suburb that forms part of Birkirkara, and is also considered a suburb of Santa Venera and Qormi. It lies approximately 5 kilometers from Malta's capital, Valletta. The population of Fleur-de-Lys is about 2,200 people and the area is very small.

== History ==
=== Wignacourt Aqueduct ===
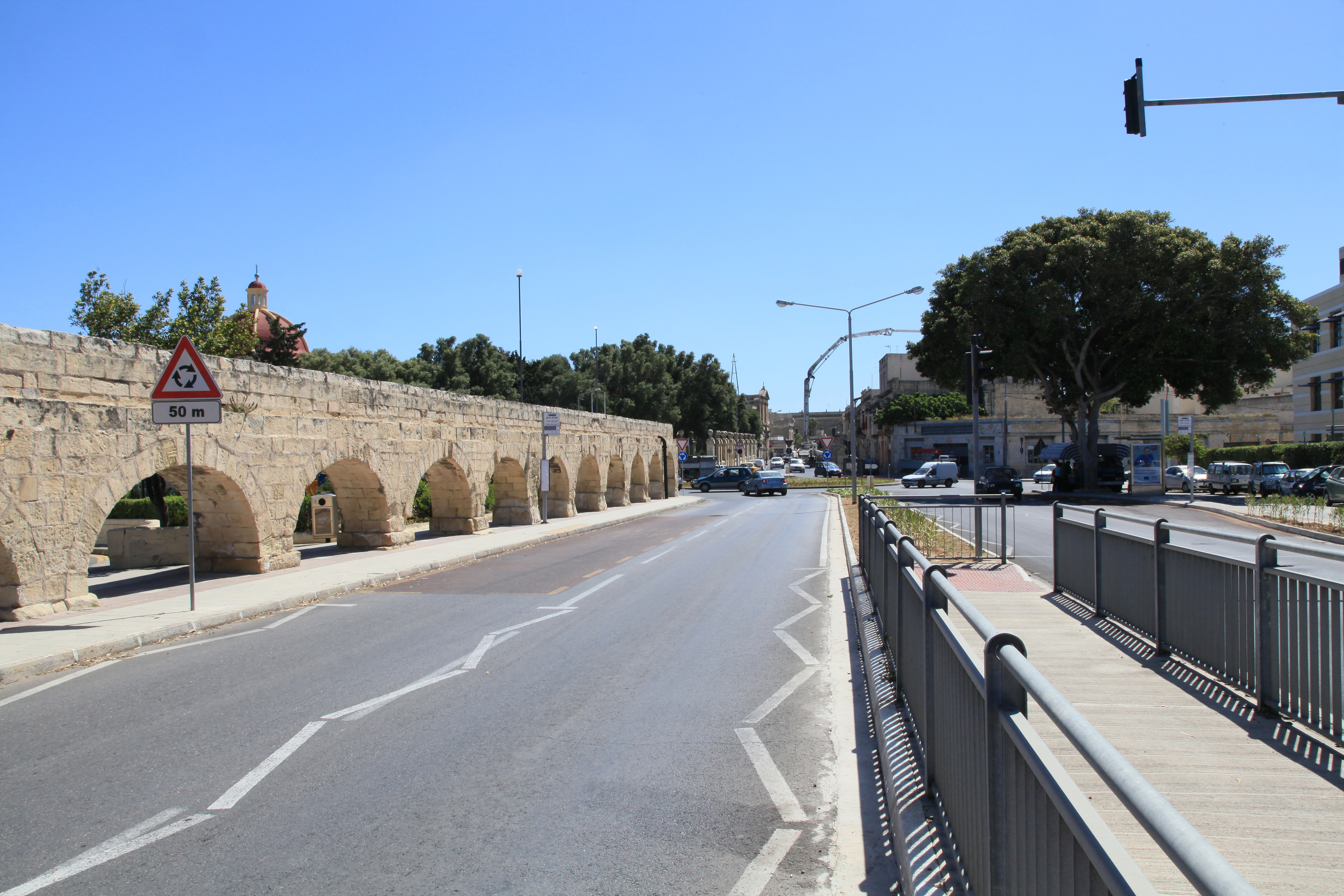
Wignacourt Aqueduct at Fleur-de-Lys

Fleur-de-Lys' origins date back to the early 17th century. In 1610, Grandmaster Alof de Wignacourt financed the building of the Wignacourt Aqueduct to transport water from springs in Rabat and Dingli to the capital Valletta. The aqueduct was finished in 1615, and an ornamental gateway known as the Wignacourt Arch (or Fleur-de-Lys Gate) was built where it crossed the road. This had three sculpted fleurs-de-lis on top, as they were the heraldic symbols of Wignacourt. The suburb was later named after these heraldic symbols on the arch.

During the Second World War, the archway was severely damaged when it was hit by an RAF lorry in 1943 and a truck in 1944. The ruined archway was demolished and the stones were stored and numbered at the Public Works Department. A roundabout was later built in its place. Plans for reconstructing the arch were made a number of times, before being finally approved in 2012. The local councils of Santa Venera and Birkirkara, as well as the Fleur-de-Lys Administrative Committee disagreed on what the arch's name should be, and eventually agreed in 2014 that it should be called "The Wignacourt Arch Known As The Fleur-de-Lys Gate". The arch was rebuilt in 2014 and 2015, and inaugurated on 28 April 2016.

=== Development of the suburb ===
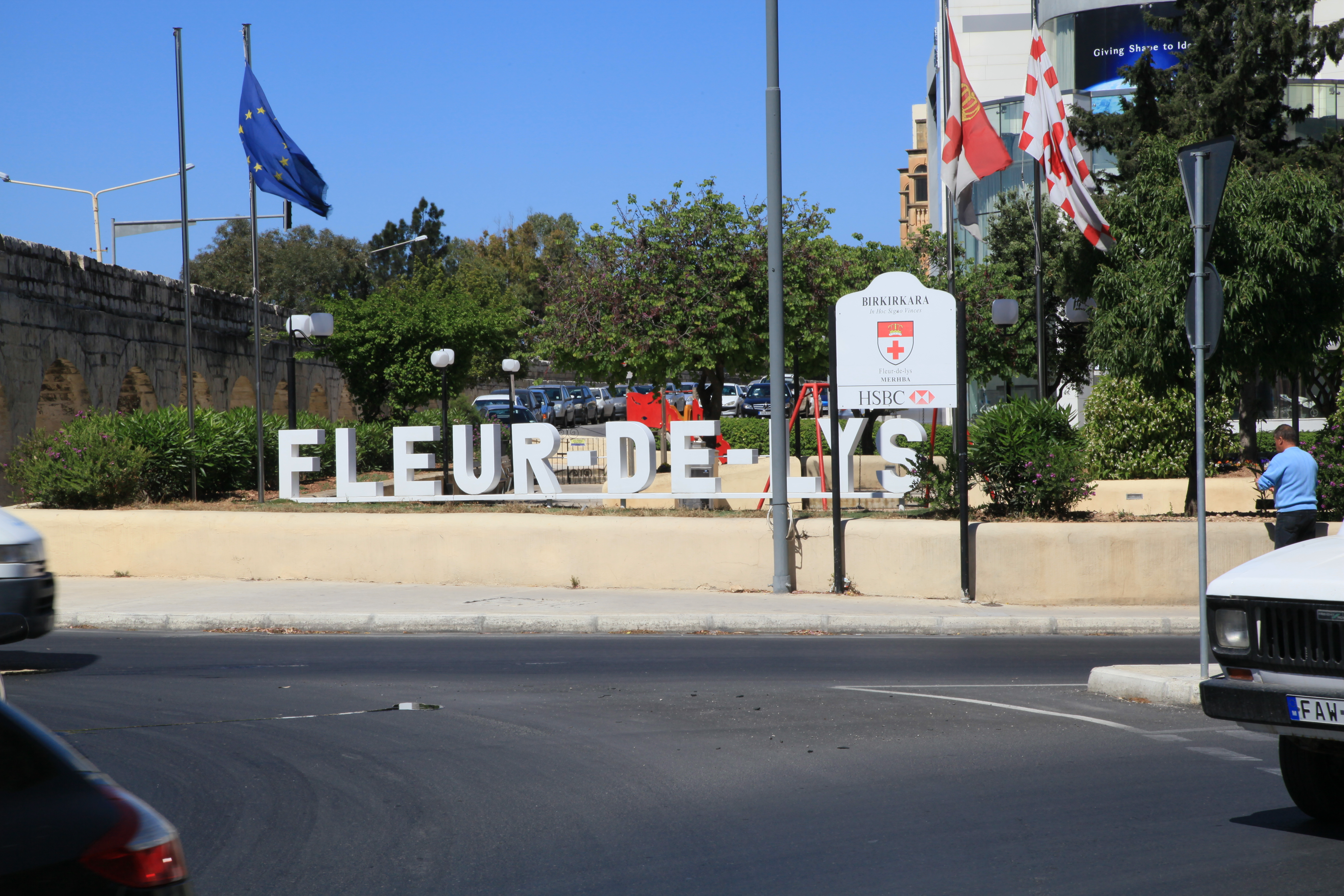
Fleur-de-Lys Playing Field

After the building of the aqueduct, a number of farmers settled in the area. For years the only buildings were a few farmhouses surrounded by fields.

Fleur-de-Lys began to develop in the Second World War. Many refugees from the Grand Harbour area fled to rural areas, including Fleur-de-Lys, after the Harbour area was devastated by bombs. By 1941, the British had built Fleur de Lys Battery in the area armed with anti-aircraft artillery. Various government offices were transferred to Fleur-de-Lys in the 1940s. After the war the area grew into a small hamlet.

In 1946, the church dedicated to Our Lady of Mount Carmel was inaugurated. It became autonomous from Santa Venera in 1949 and became a parish in 1975. Other chapels were later built in Fleur-de-Lys, including those in the Sisters of the Sacred Heart Convent and one in St Monica School.

Nowadays the suburb contains several small shops, a parish church and a BOV and an HSBC bank. The main road, Fleur-de-Lys Road, is now a major artery to Malta's local traffic system.

The Fleur-de-Lys Administrative Committee was created in December 1999 by an amendment to the Local Councils Act of 1993.
