= Wignacourt Arch =

Ornamental arch in Malta

- L-Arkata ta' Wignacourt
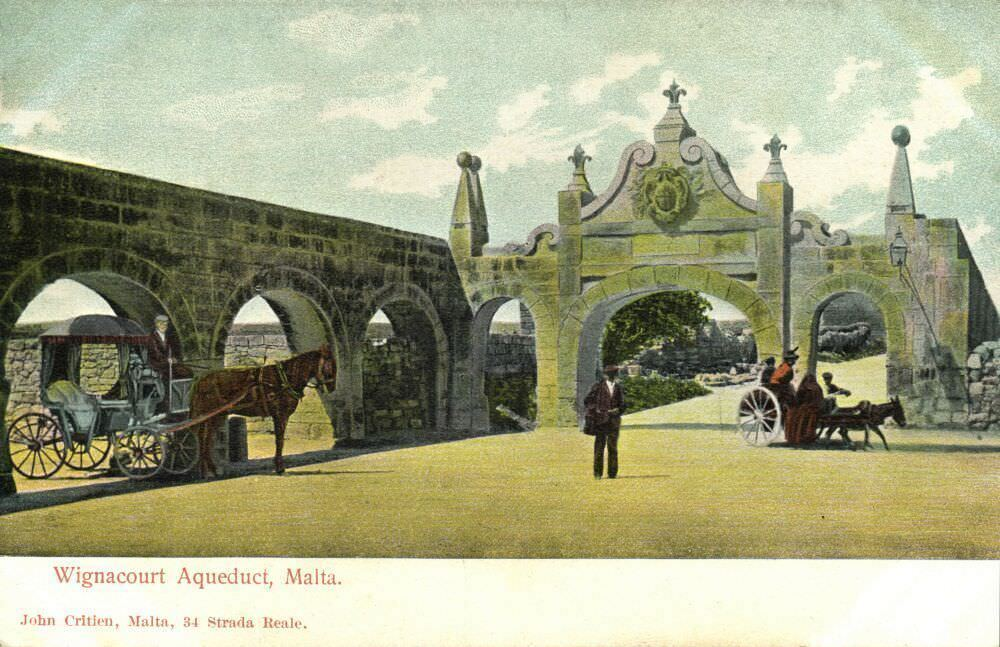
- The original Wignacourt Arch on a postcard
- Interactive map of the Wignacourt Arch area
- Alternative names: Fleur-de-Lys Gate

General information
- Status: Rebuilt
- Type: Ornamental arch
- Architectural style: Baroque
- Location: Fleur-de-Lys (Birkirkara) and Santa Venera, Malta
- Coordinates: 35°53′24″N 14°28′22.5″E
- Named for: Alof de Wignacourt
- Completed: 1615 (original); November 2015 (replica)
- Inaugurated: 28 April 2016 (replica)
- Destroyed: 18 April 1943 – 12 February 1944 (original)
- Cost: €280,000 (replica)

Technical details
- Material: Limestone

Design and construction
- Architect: Bontadino de Bontadini

The Wignacourt Arch known as the Fleur-De-Lys Gate (Maltese: L-Arkata ta' Wignacourt magħrufa bħala l-Bieb ta' Fleur-De-Lys) is an ornamental arch located on the boundary between Fleur-de-Lys (a suburb of Birkirkara) and Santa Venera, Malta. The arch was originally built in 1615 as part of the Wignacourt Aqueduct, but it was destroyed in 1943 and 1944. A replica of the arch was constructed in 2015 and inaugurated on 28 April 2016.

== Original arch ==
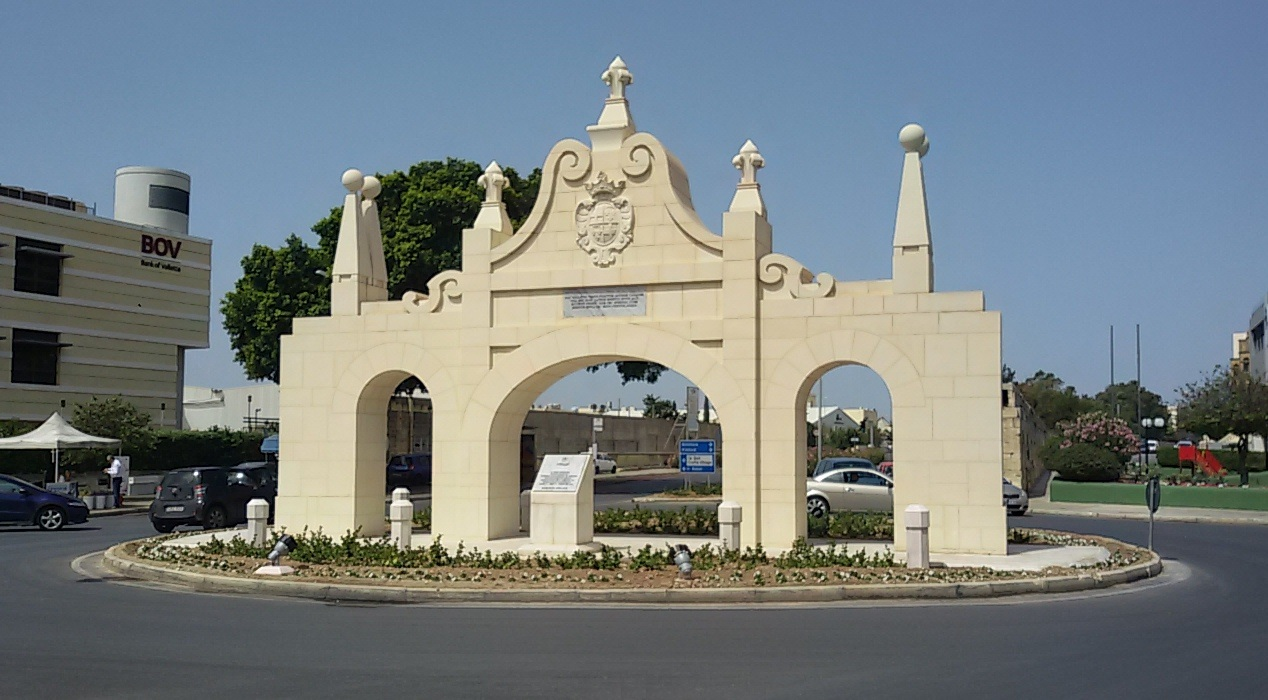
Santa Venera-facing side of the replica arch

The Wignacourt Aqueduct was constructed between 1610 and 1615 to carry water from springs in Dingli and Rabat to the Maltese capital Valletta. It was named after Alof de Wignacourt, the Grand Master of the Order of St. John, who partially financed its construction.

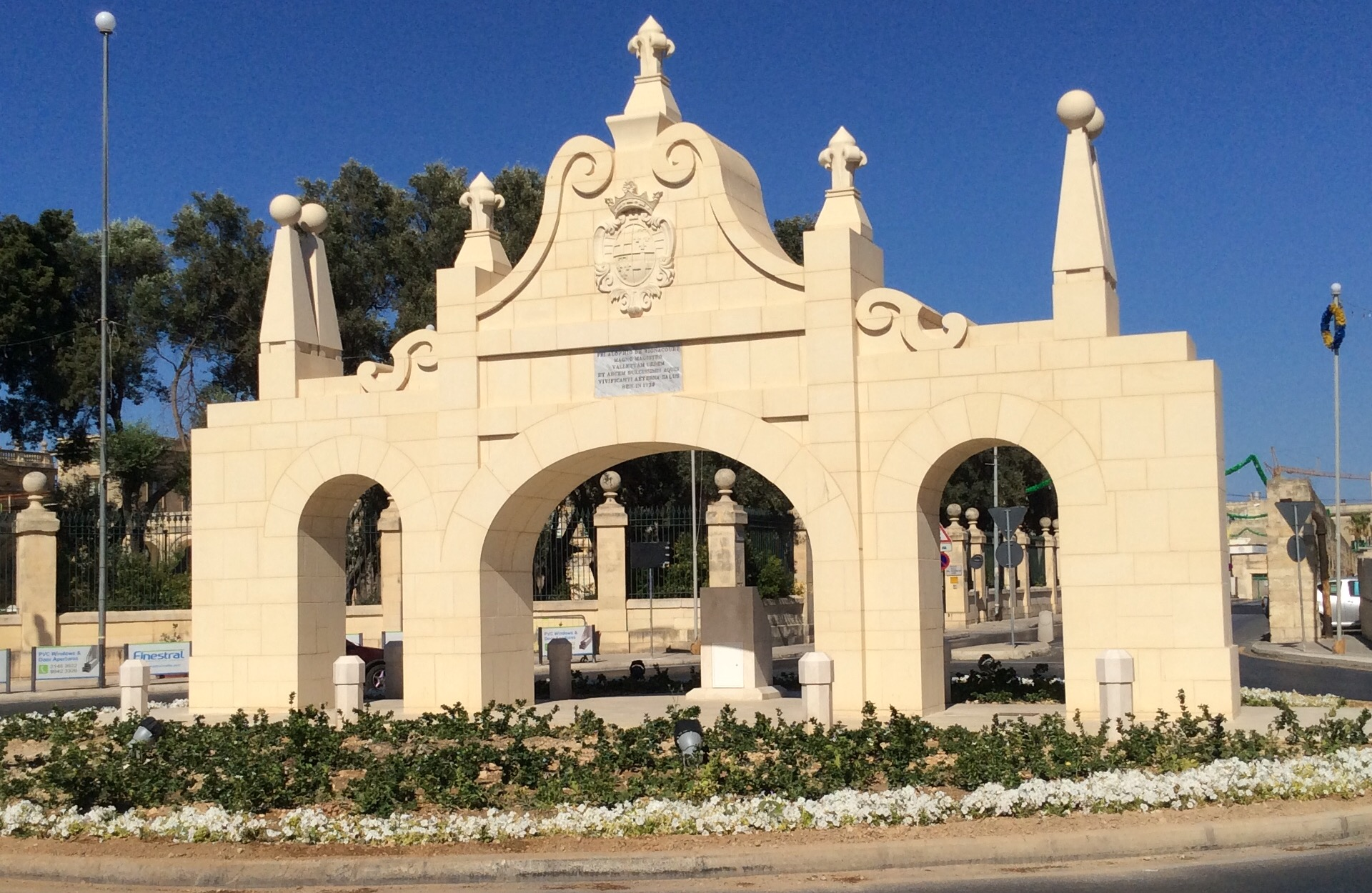
Birkirkara-facing side of the replica arch

The aqueduct was carried through underground pipes or over a series of stone arches where there were depressions in the ground level. To commemorate the construction of the aqueduct, the Wignacourt Arch was constructed at an area where the aqueduct crossed the road leading from Valletta to Mdina. The Baroque archway had a large arch in the centre, and a smaller arch on either side. It was decorated with three fleurs-de-lis, a relief of Wignacourt's coat of arms, and two marble plaques with Latin inscriptions. The plaque on the side facing Santa Venera read:

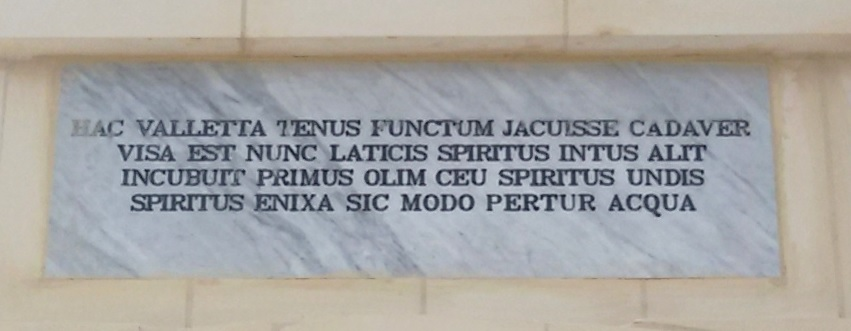

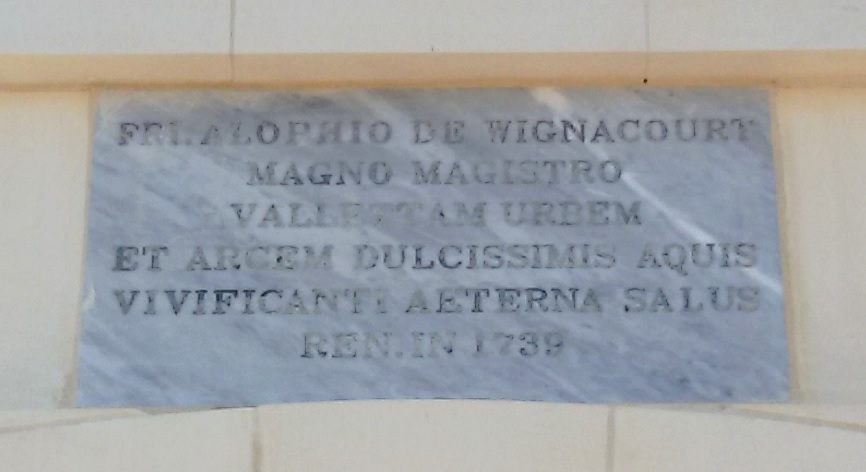
The two plaques on the reconstructed arch

HAC VALLETTA TENUS FUNCTUM JACUISSE CADAVER
VISA EST NUNC LATICIS SPIRITUS INTUS ALIT
INCUBUIT PRIMUS OLIM CEU SPIRITUS UNDIS
SPIRITUS ENIXA, SIC MODO FERTUR ACQUA
BONTADINO DE BONTADINIS, BONEN. AQUÆ DUCTORE. 1615. (Note: The final line of this inscription is omitted from the plaque on the replica arch.)

(meaning So far Valletta lay as a corpse. Today the spirit of water has brought life to her. The primordial spirit floated on water. Now water has been drawn to her and that spirit reappears. Bontadino de Bontadini from Bologna is he who delivered the waters 1615.)

The plaque on the side facing Birkirkara read:

FRI. ALOPHIO DE WIGNACOURT
MAGNO MAGISTRO
VALLETTAM URBEM
ET ARCEM DULCISSIMIS AQUIS
VIVIFICANTI AETERNA SALUS
REN. IN 1739

(meaning Fra Alof de Wignacourt, Grand Master. Valletta city and citadel, the sweetest waters revive eternal salvation. Renovated in 1739.)

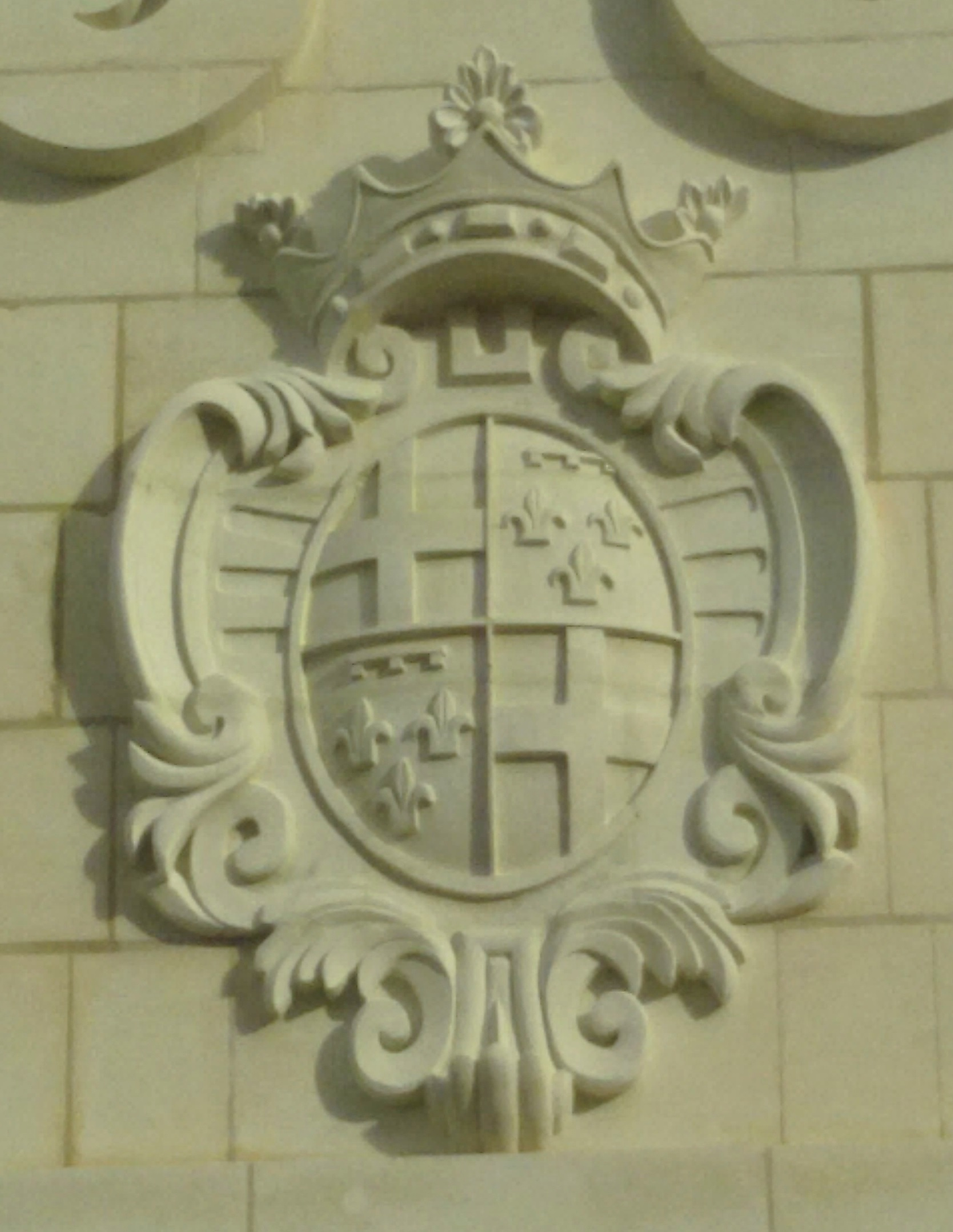
Coat of arms of Alof de Wignacourt on the reconstructed arch

The area around the arch remained rural until the early 20th century. A tram used to pass near the arch between 1905 and 1929. After World War II, the suburb of Fleur-de-Lys developed in the area, and it got its name from the heraldic symbols on the arch.

=== Destruction ===
On 18 April 1943, a Royal Air Force breakdown lorry heading to the airfield at Ta' Qali at night with no street light hit the arch and severely damaged its Santa Venera-facing façade. The central arch was dismantled by military personnel under the supervision of the Public Works Department about two months later. The arch was completely destroyed on 12 February 1944, when a Royal Army Service Corps truck hit the remaining parts of the structure. The stone remains were supposedly stored by the British but, similar to several other historic relics, they were never retrieved by the Maltese and the whereabouts are unknown. However, the arch's two marble plaques were repossessed.

A roundabout with a fountain was later built on the site of the arch. Some arches of the aqueduct were demolished in order to widen the road and make way for this roundabout.

== Reconstruction ==
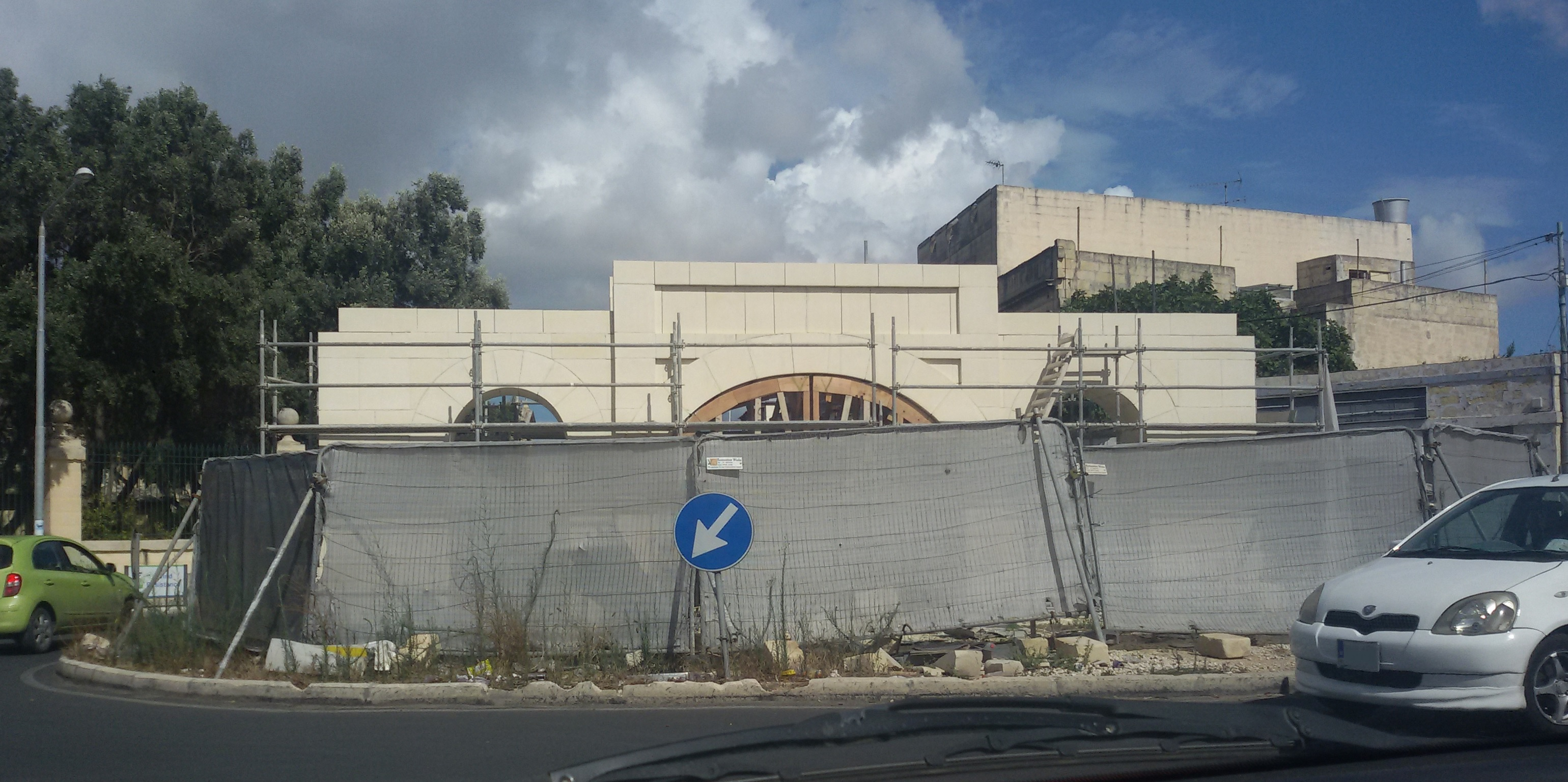

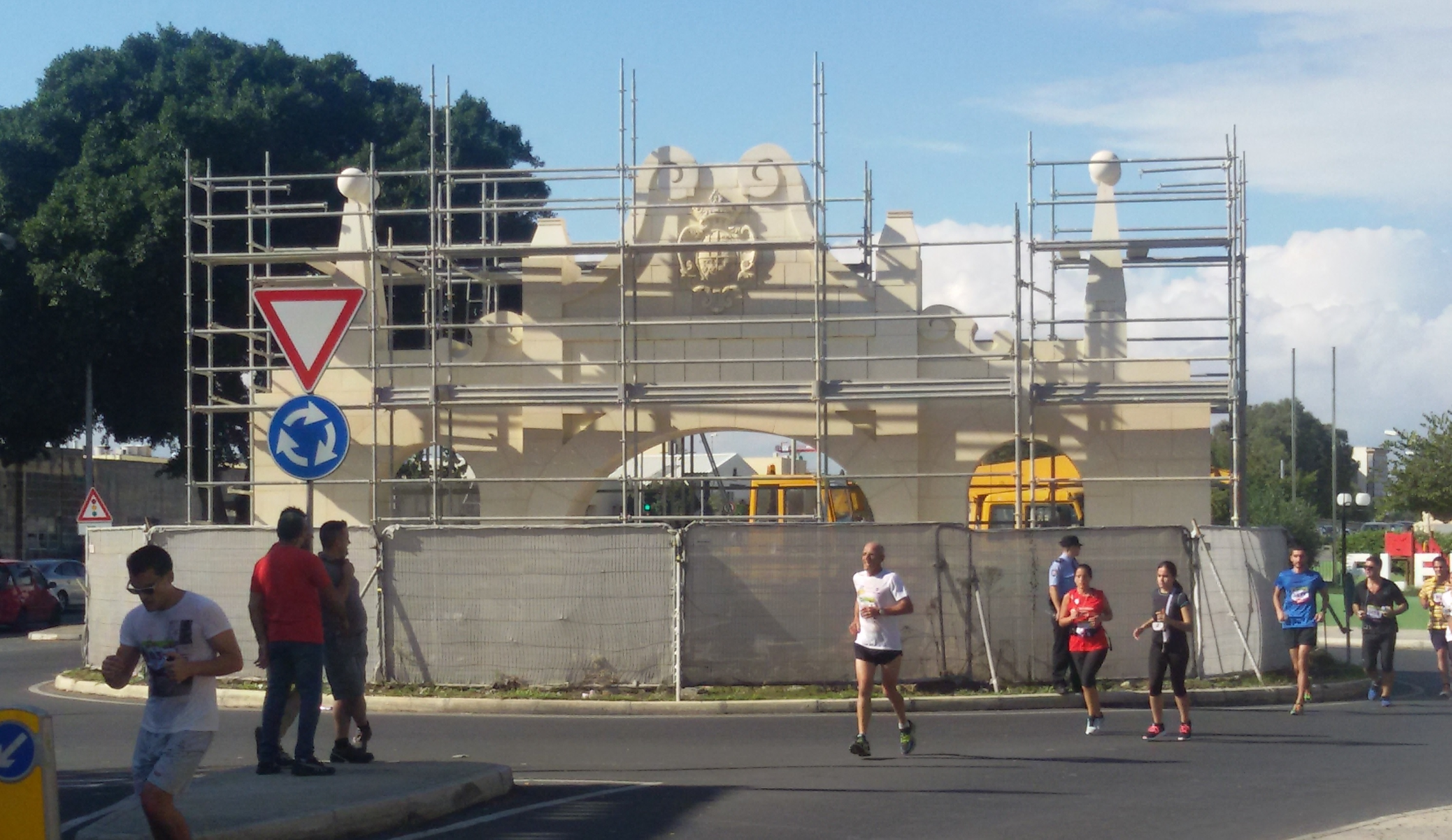
Reconstruction of the arch in August (top) and November 2015 (bottom)

The surviving arches of the Wignacourt Aqueduct were restored between 2004 and 2005. The chairman of the Bank of Valletta, whose headquarters is located close to the arch, promised to build a replica of the arch but initially nothing materialized.

In 2012, the Fleur-de-Lys Administrative Committee and the Birkirkara Local Council announced that they were planning to rebuild the arch to the same dimensions of the original. The police force had initially objected to the project, believing it could become a traffic hazard, but of similar risk comparisons to other monumental arches and gates in Malta, such as the Portes de Bombes. The plans were eventually approved by the Malta Environment and Planning Authority in October of the same year, but they were placed on hold since a tender appeal had to be sorted out. In April 2013, the tender was awarded to Vaults Ltd instead of V&C Contractors who had originally won the tender. The replica arch cost €280,000 to build, and €100,000 of these were donated by the Bank of Valletta. €40,000 were taken from the Good Causes Fund, while the remaining €140,000 were paid by the Birkirkara Local Council.

While preparations were being made for rebuilding the arch, a dispute arose between the Birkirkara and Santa Venera Local Councils on what to call the arch. The former said that it should be called Fleur-de-Lys Gate, while the latter insisted on using the name Wignacourt Arch. In September 2013, the Santa Venera council took the Birkirkara council to court and accused it of causing "historical damage" by calling the arch with an incorrect name. The councils agreed on using the name The Wignacourt Arch known as the Fleur-de-Lys Gate in August 2014.

Reconstruction of the arch began on 1 August 2014, but work stopped soon afterwards after part of the original arch's foundations was found. Reconstruction continued in January 2015, and it was complete by the end of November 2015. Some finishing touches were made in February 2016, including the installation of two marble plaques. The arch was inaugurated on 28 April 2016 by Prime Minister Joseph Muscat and mayor of Birkirkara Joanne Debono Grech.

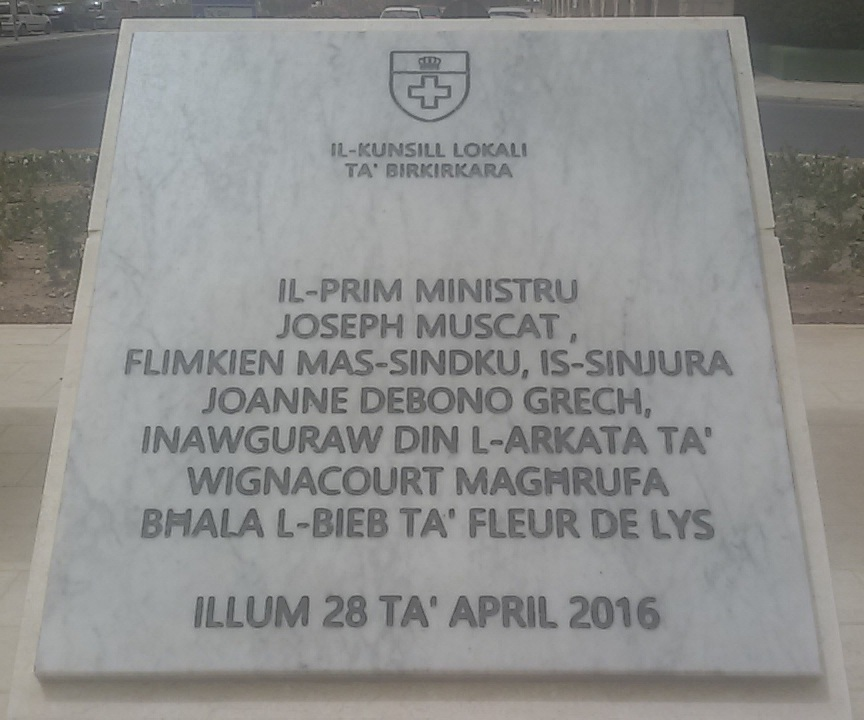
Plaque commemorating the reconstruction

A plaque with the coat of arms of Birkirkara and the following inscription was installed to commemorate the reconstruction:

IL-KUNSILL LOKALI
TA' BIRKIRKARA

IL-PRIM MINISTRU
JOSEPH MUSCAT,
FLIMKIEN MAS-SINDKU, IS-SINJURA
JOANNE DEBONO GRECH,
INAWGURAW DIN L-ARKATA TA'
WIGNACOURT MAGĦRUFA
BĦALA L-BIEB TA' FLEUR DE LYS

ILLUM 28 TA' APRIL 2016

(meaning Birkirkara Local Council. Prime Minister Joseph Muscat, together with the mayor, Mrs. Joanne Debono Grech, inaugurated the Wignacourt Arch known as the Fleur-De-Lys Gate, today 28 April 2016)

== Commemorations ==
In 2015, the Central Bank of Malta minted a €10 silver coin, and MaltaPost issued a set of two stamps to commemorate the 400th anniversary of the Wignacourt Aqueduct. The Wignacourt Arch is depicted on the coin and one of the stamps.
