= Wignacourt Aqueduct =

17th-century aqueduct in Malta

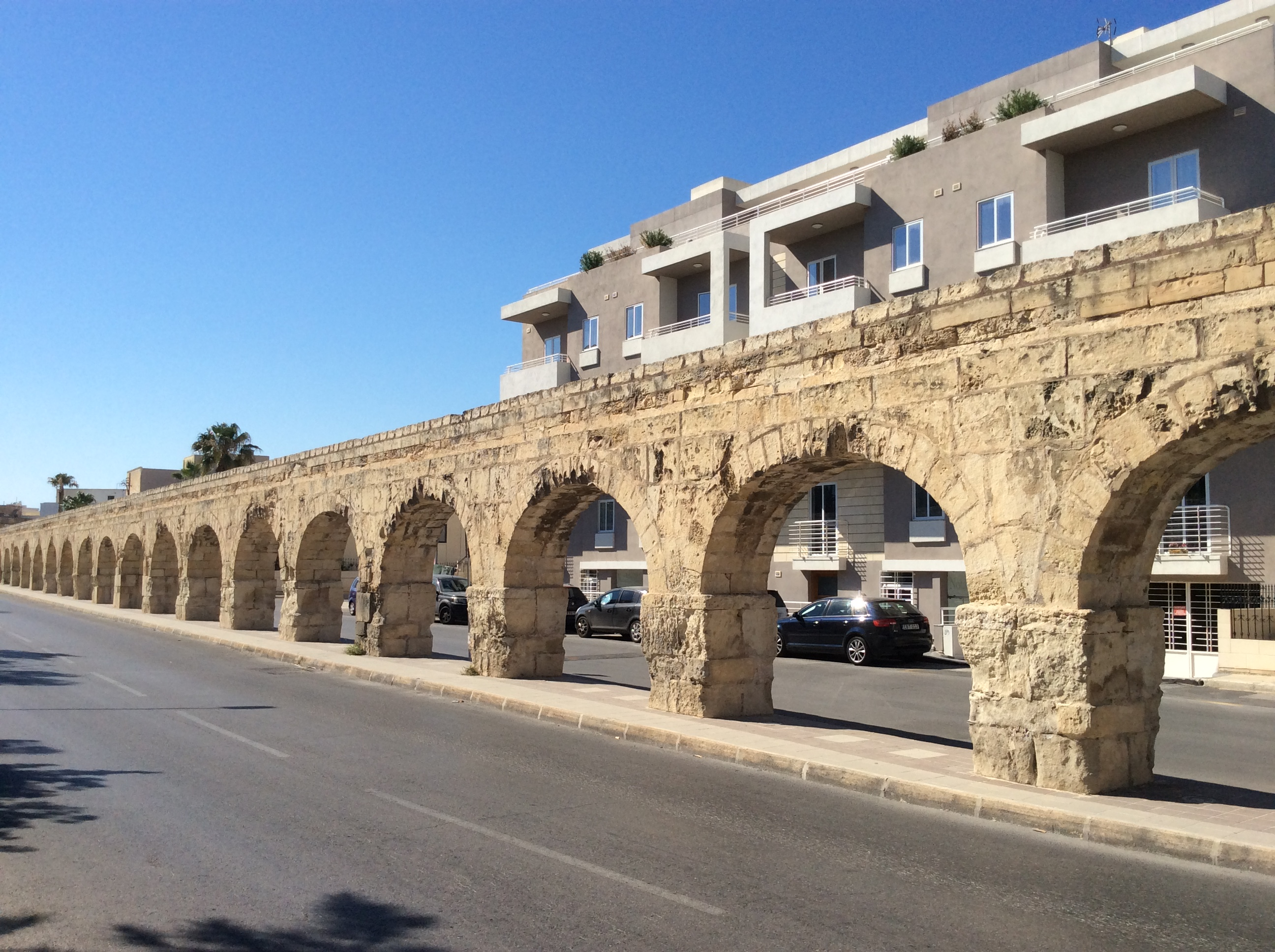
- Part of the aqueduct at Birkirkara
- Coordinates: 35°53′35″N 14°27′39″E
- Begins: Dingli and Rabat
- Ends: Valletta

Characteristics
- Total length: c. 26.5 km (29,000 yd) (Note: 7478 canne from Djar Ħandul to the Grandmaster's Palace.)
- Capacity: 1,400 m^{3} (49,000 cu ft) daily

History
- Construction start: 19 October 1596 (first attempt); 9 January 1610 (second attempt)
- Opened: 21 April 1615
- Closed: 20th century

Location
- Interactive map of Wignacourt Aqueduct

The Wignacourt Aqueduct (Maltese: L-Akwedott ta' Wignacourt) is a 17th-century aqueduct in Malta, which was built by the Order of Saint John to carry water from springs in Dingli and Rabat to the newly built capital city Valletta. The aqueduct carried water through underground pipes and over arched viaducts across depressions in the ground.

The first attempts to build the aqueduct were made by Grand Master Martin Garzez in 1596, but construction was suspended before being continued in 1610. The watercourse was inaugurated five years later on 21 April 1615. Several engineers took part in the project, including Bontadino de Bontadini, Giovanni Attard and Natale Tomasucci. The aqueduct was named after Grand Master Alof de Wignacourt, who partially financed its construction.

The aqueduct remained in use until the 20th century. Most of its arches still survive today, and can still be seen in the localities of Attard, Balzan, Birkirkara, Fleur-de-Lys and Santa Venera. Other remains of the aqueduct include water towers at Santa Venera, Hamrun and Floriana, and several fountains in Floriana and Valletta.

== History ==
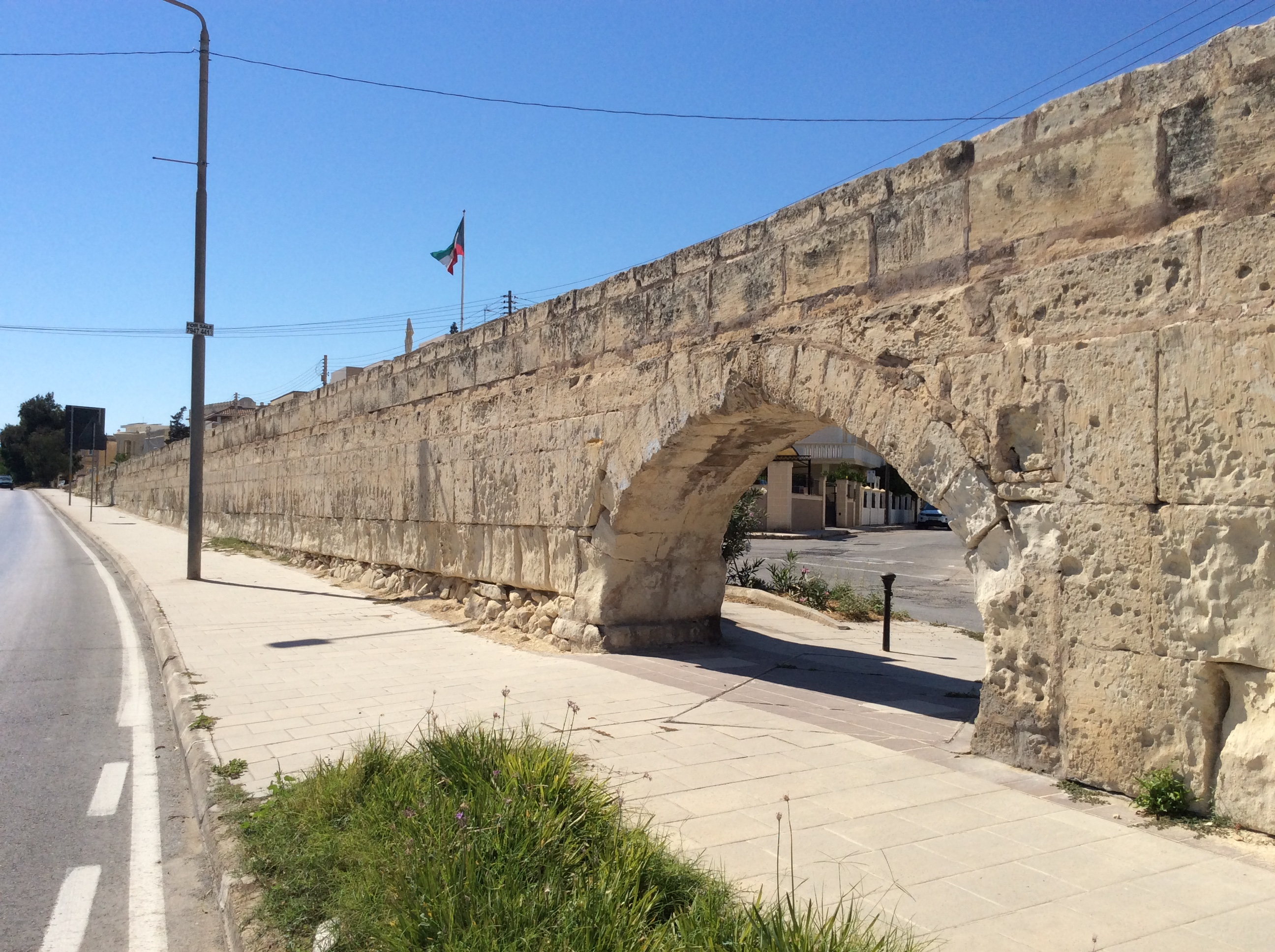
Lone arch at Balzan

In 1566, the capital city of Valletta was founded on the Sciberras Peninsula, which did not have a good water supply. Rainwater collected within the city was not enough to meet the needs of its population. Water had to be carted from springs to the city, but this became difficult by the end of the 16th century, when the city had become the largest settlement in Malta. At the time, there were also fears of an Ottoman attack on Malta, so a steady water supply to the capital was a priority for the military authorities in case of a siege.

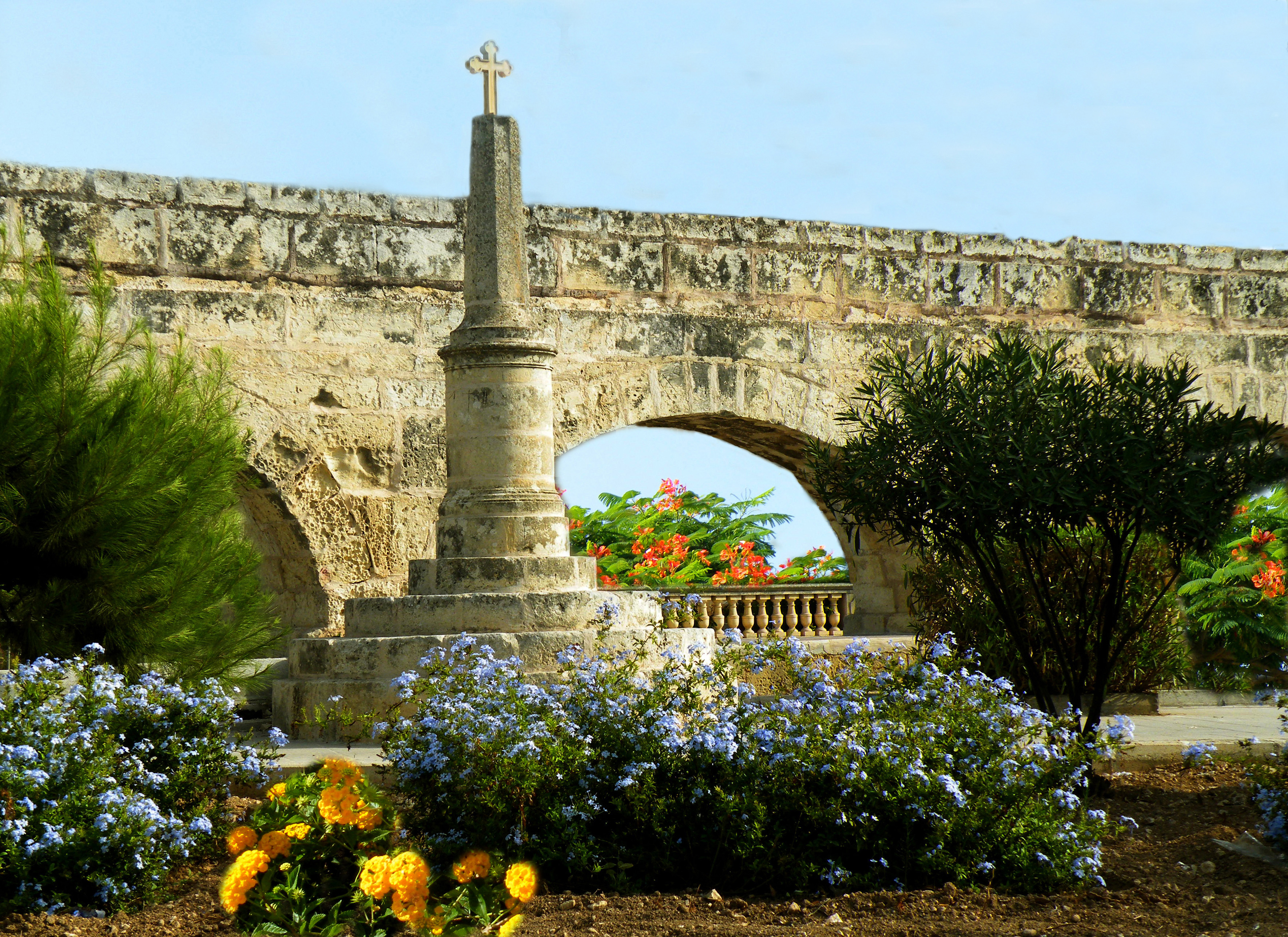
Wignacourt Aqueduct at the boundary between Balzan and Birkirkara

The order to build an aqueduct to carry water from springs in Dingli and Rabat to the capital was issued on 19 October 1596. That year, Grand Master Martin Garzez brought in the Jesuit Padre Giacomo to design the watercourse. His design was accepted and work was begun, but construction was suspended soon afterwards due to financial reasons.

On 9 January 1610, work on the aqueduct began again under the direction of another Jesuit called Padre Natale Tomasucci. By this time, Garzez had died and was succeeded as Grand Master by Alof de Wignacourt. In July 1612, the Bolognese hydraulic expert Bontadino de Bontadini took over the project, probably on the recommendation of Inquisitor Evangelista Carbonesi. Bontadini designed a new watercourse with water being carried through underground pipes and over stone arches when there were depressions in the ground. Bontadini was assisted by a Maltese capomastro Giovanni Attard and two other Sicilian engineers. 600 local workers were employed in the construction of the aqueduct, which was completed in 1614 and inaugurated on 21 April 1615. The aqueduct cost a total of 434,605 scudi, most of which was paid by Grandmaster Wignacourt. The aqueduct was therefore named in his honour.

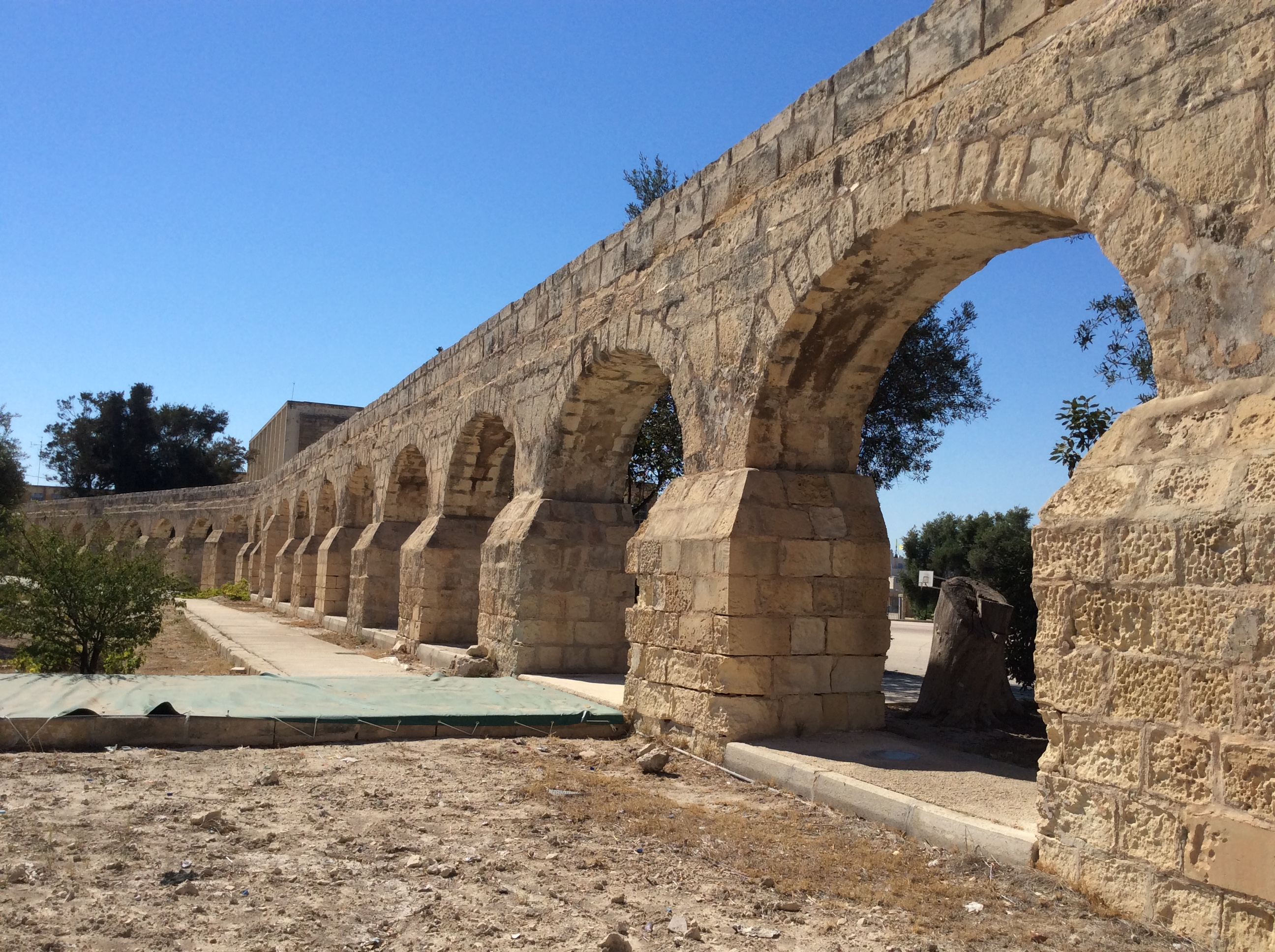
Part of the aqueduct at Birkirkara, now on the grounds of a government school

Upon its completion, the aqueduct supplied 1,400 m^{3} (49,000 cu ft) of water every day to around 30,000 people. The constant supply of water brought about a rise in the populations of Valletta, Floriana and other towns and villages along the route of the aqueduct.

The aqueduct was improved by Grand Master Emmanuel de Rohan-Polduc in 1781. On 4 September 1798, in the early stages of the Maltese uprising against the French, insurgents ambushed French soldiers near the aqueduct at Mrieħel, in the limits of Birkirkara.

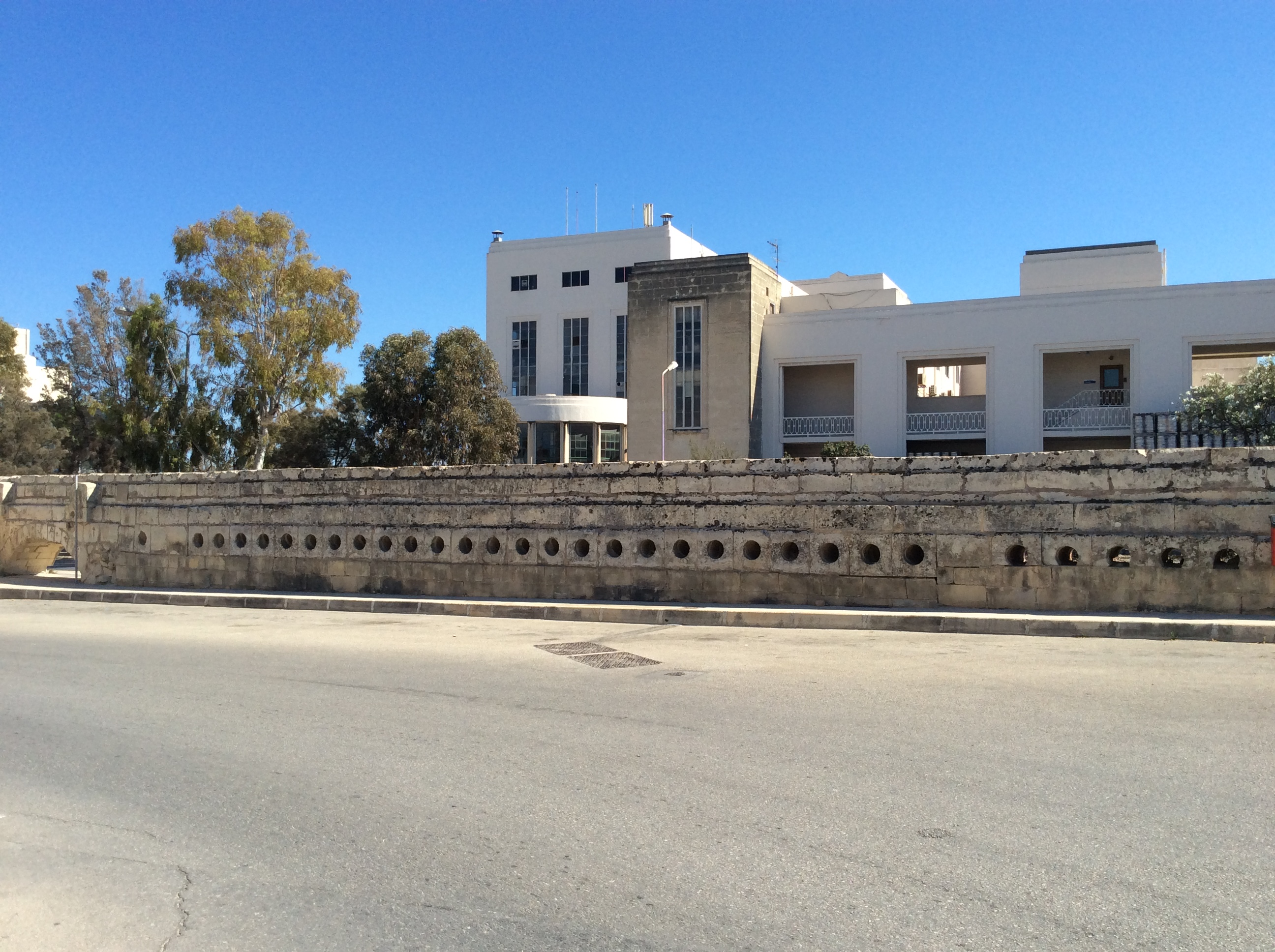
Wignacourt Aqueduct at Mrieħel, with the Farsons Brewery in the background. The stones with circular holes were originally part of Tomasucci's pipes from the first attempt to build the aqueduct.

In 1907, there was a proposal to construct buildings on top of the aqueduct, with its arches effectively serving as an arcade. The Office of the Public Works drew up plans for these buildings, but eventually nothing materialized. The aqueduct remained in use until the early 20th century. Parts of the aqueduct, such as in Mosta Road, Attard, were demolished after WWII due to the development of housing estates and roadbuilding in the area.

From 2004 to 2005, the aqueduct's surviving arches were restored and a lighting system was installed at a total cost of Lm 140,000. Some of the arches are in need of restoration once again, mainly because of pollution since a major road now runs alongside the aqueduct. A section of the aqueduct was extensively damaged in December 2013 due to a car crash, but the damage has since been repaired.

Various sections of the aqueduct are scheduled by the Malta Environment and Planning Authority (MEPA) as grade 1 national monuments and are listed on the National Inventory of the Cultural Property of the Maltese Islands.

== Architecture ==
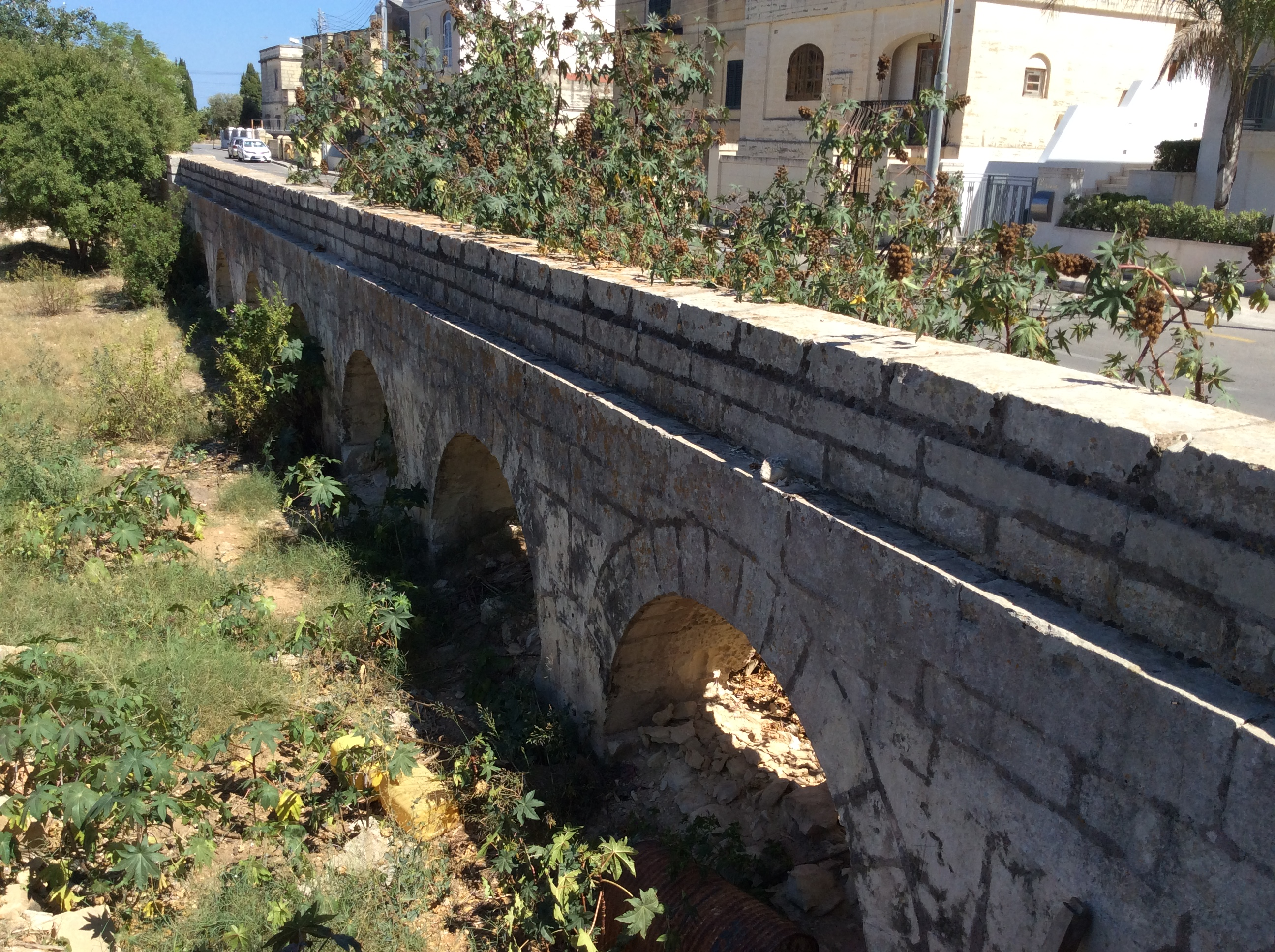
Wignacourt Aqueduct at Peter Paul Rubens Street in Attard

The aqueduct ran from the springs in Rabat and Dingli to the countryside near Attard through underground pipes. From Attard onwards, the ground level was irregular so stone arches were constructed where there were depressions. The arches begin at present-day Peter Paul Rubens Street (Maltese: Triq Peter Paul Rubens) in Attard, and are initially quite small. They continue through Mdina Road (Maltese: Triq l-Imdina) in Balzan and Birkirkara, and the height of the arches gradually increases as the ground level drops.

At Fleur-de-Lys, the aqueduct crossed the road, and the Wignacourt Arch was built to commemorate the project. The arches then continue through St. Joseph High Road (Maltese: Triq il-Kbira San Ġużepp) in Santa Venera, until they stop at a small tower known as the Tower of St. Joseph. From this tower, water continued its journey to Hamrun, Blata l-Bajda, Floriana and Valletta through underground pipes once again. Water inspection towers were also built at Hamrun and Floriana.

The aqueduct was built of local limestone. Stones were attached with the use of pozzolana. It was this successful feature that gave most praise to Bontadini. The aqueduct supplied water to cisterns in private and public buildings, to ships in Marsamxett Harbour and Grand Harbour, and to fountains which generally included a water trough.

=== Wignacourt Arch/Fleur-de-Lys Gate ===
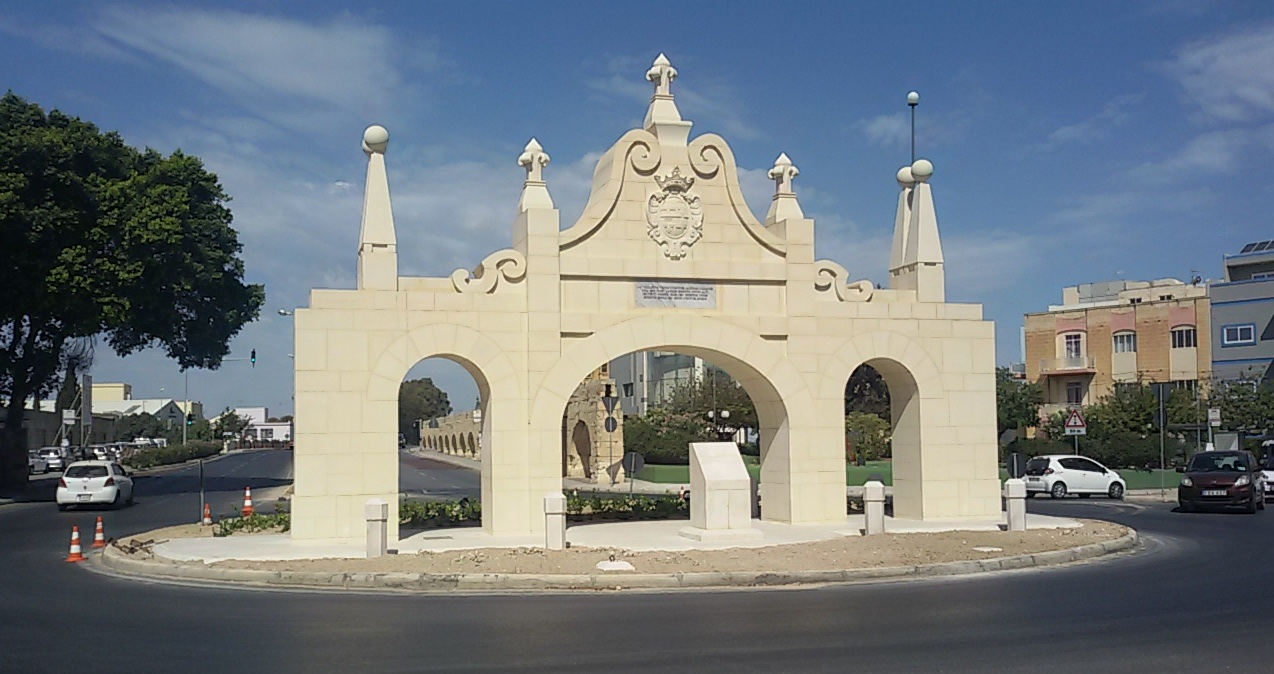
The reconstructed Wignacourt Arch (or Fleur-de-Lys Gate)

The triumphal archway at the boundary between Fleur-de-Lys and Santa Venera is known as the Wignacourt Arch or the Fleur-de-Lys Gate. It has three doorways, and it is adorned with the Wignacourt coat of arms and three sculpted fleurs-de-lis, the heraldic symbols of Wignacourt. The suburb of Fleur-de-Lys got its name from this arch, and fleurs-de-lis are featured on the flags and coat of arms of both Fleur-de-Lys and Santa Venera. One of the original plaques on the arch gave due respect to the engineer Bontadino de Bontadini. The arch, together with the aqueduct's water towers and fountains, were the first expression of baroque architecture in Malta.

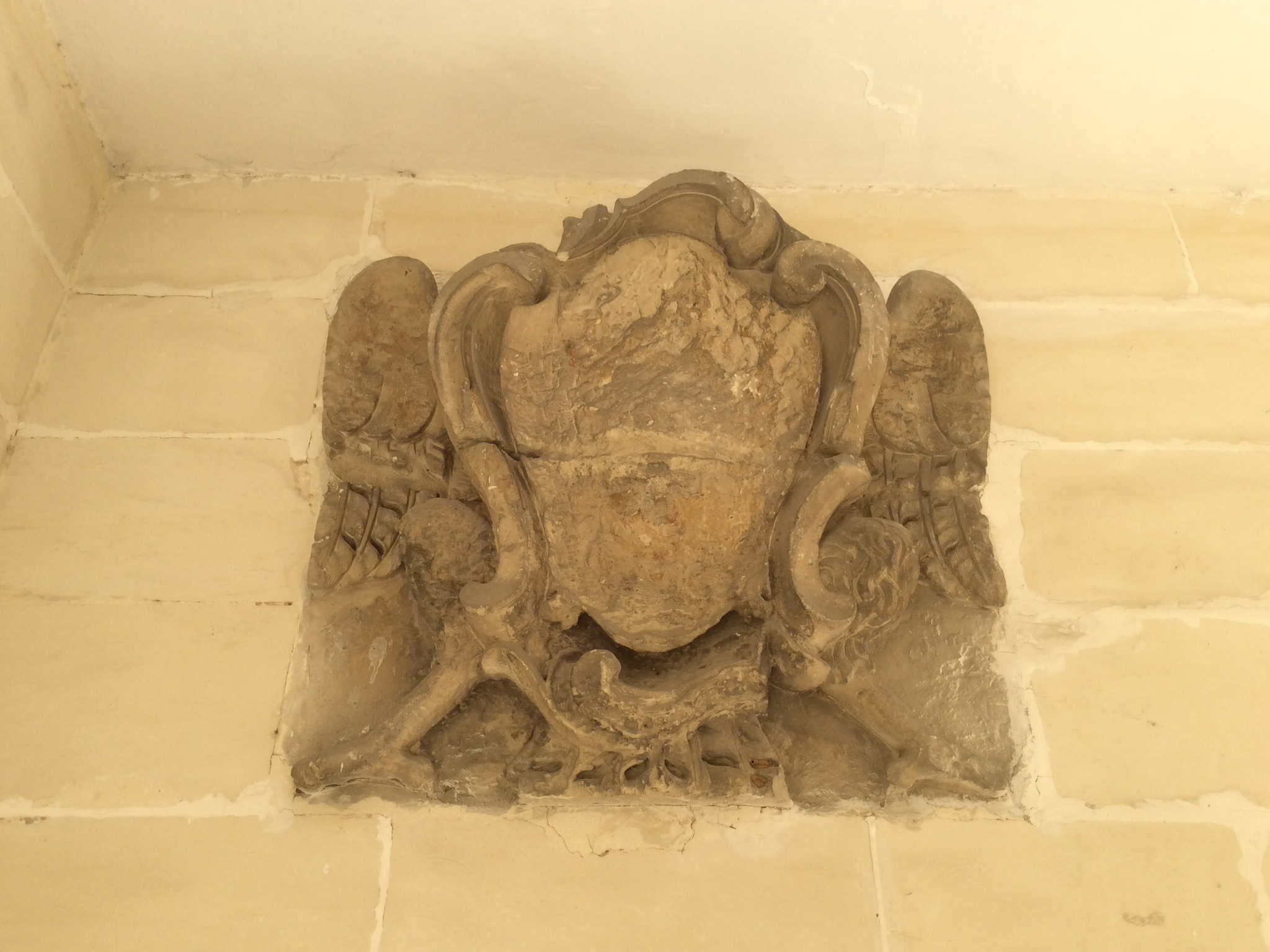
The coat-of-arms of Grand Master de Rohan

The original arch was demolished in 1944, and a roundabout was later built on its site. The construction of a replica of the arch was approved in 2012. The local councils of Santa Venera and Birkirkara, as well as the Fleur-de-Lys Administrative Committee disagreed on what the arch's name should be, and eventually agreed in 2014 that it should be called "The Wignacourt Arch Known As The Fleur-de-Lys Gate". The arch was reconstructed in 2015, and inaugurated on 28 April 2016.

A late eighteenth-century coat of arms belonging to Grand Master Emmanuel de Rohan-Polduc was probably attached to the arch looking towards Mdina after the restoration of the aqueduct by de Rohan, but no certainty can be established; this coat of arms still exists and is located a few metres away, close to St Joseph Tower (see below), attached to a wall outside the entrance of a police station.

=== Water inspection towers ===
==== Santa Venera ====
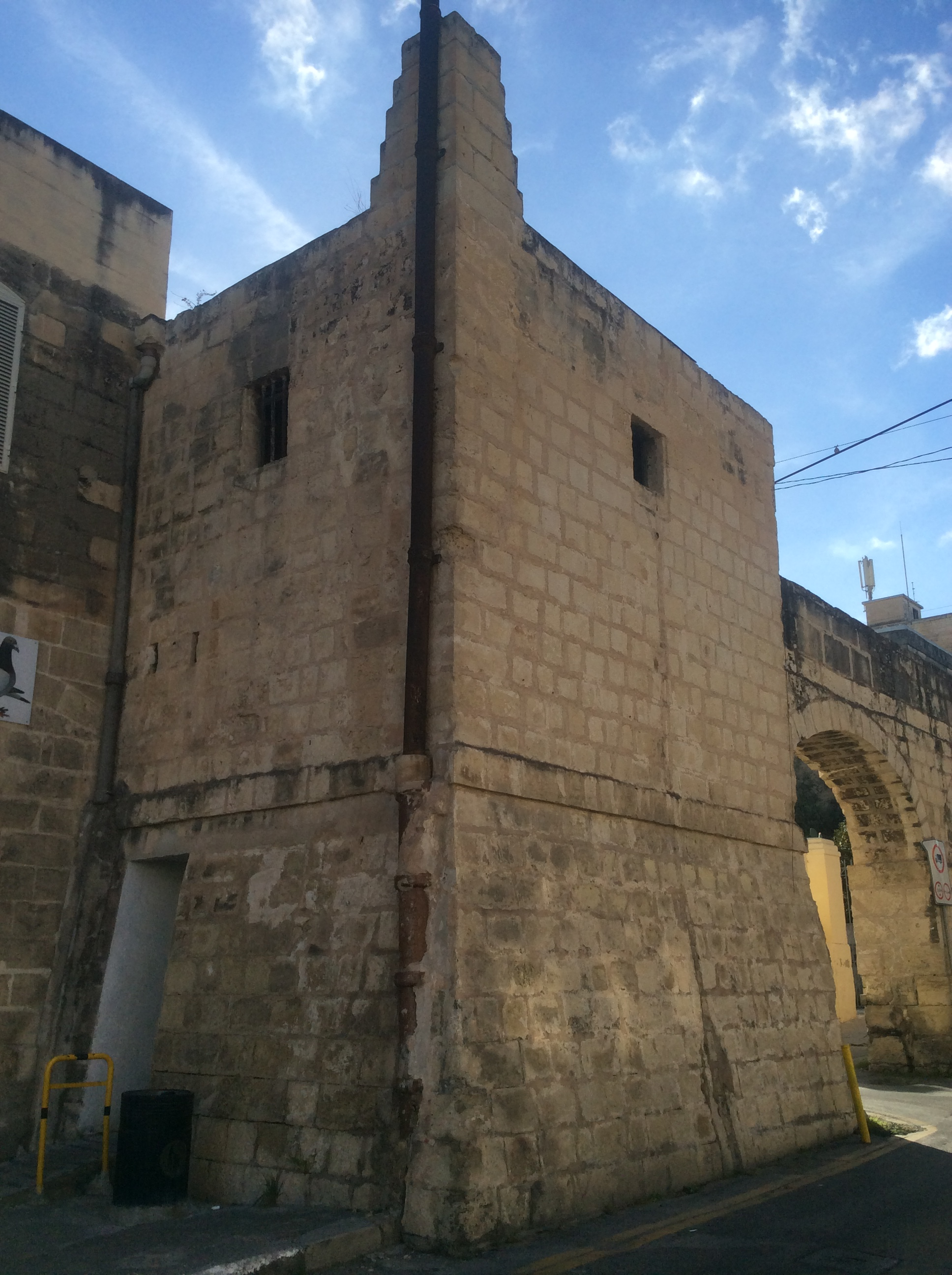
Tower of St. Joseph (it-Turretta) at Santa Venera

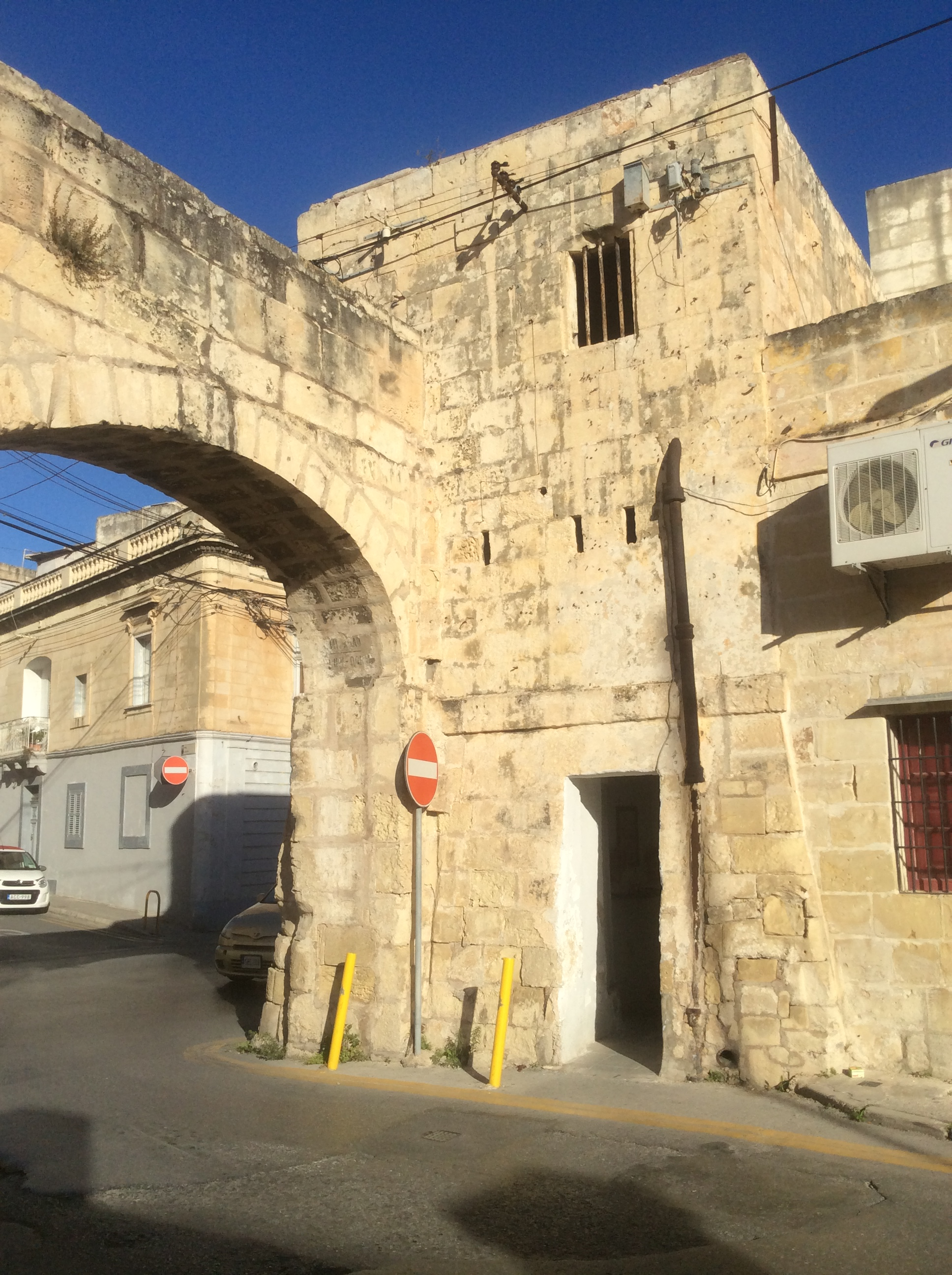
The Tower of St. Joseph viewed from the rear

The first inspection tower of the Wignacourt Aqueduct is located in present-day Santa Venera. It is called the Tower of St. Joseph (Italian: Torre di San Giuseppe), but is commonly known as it-Turretta in Maltese or the Torretta in Italian. The turret is linked to the aqueduct's arches, and it has two floors with a buttressed lower level, giving it the resemblance of a coastal watchtower such as the De Redin towers. It is not clear if the present structure is the original one, since the original designs of the aqueduct show a slightly different tower. The tower had the following inscription (no longer visible):

QUAM SUBTERRANEIS SESE DUCTIBUS
INFERENTEM HOC LOCO AMITTIS AQUAM
EADEM URBE MEDIA PULCHERRIMO
SESE FONTE COMPERIES EFFERENTEM.
INGENIO MIRO BONTADINI DE BONTADINIS BONON.

==== Hamrun ====
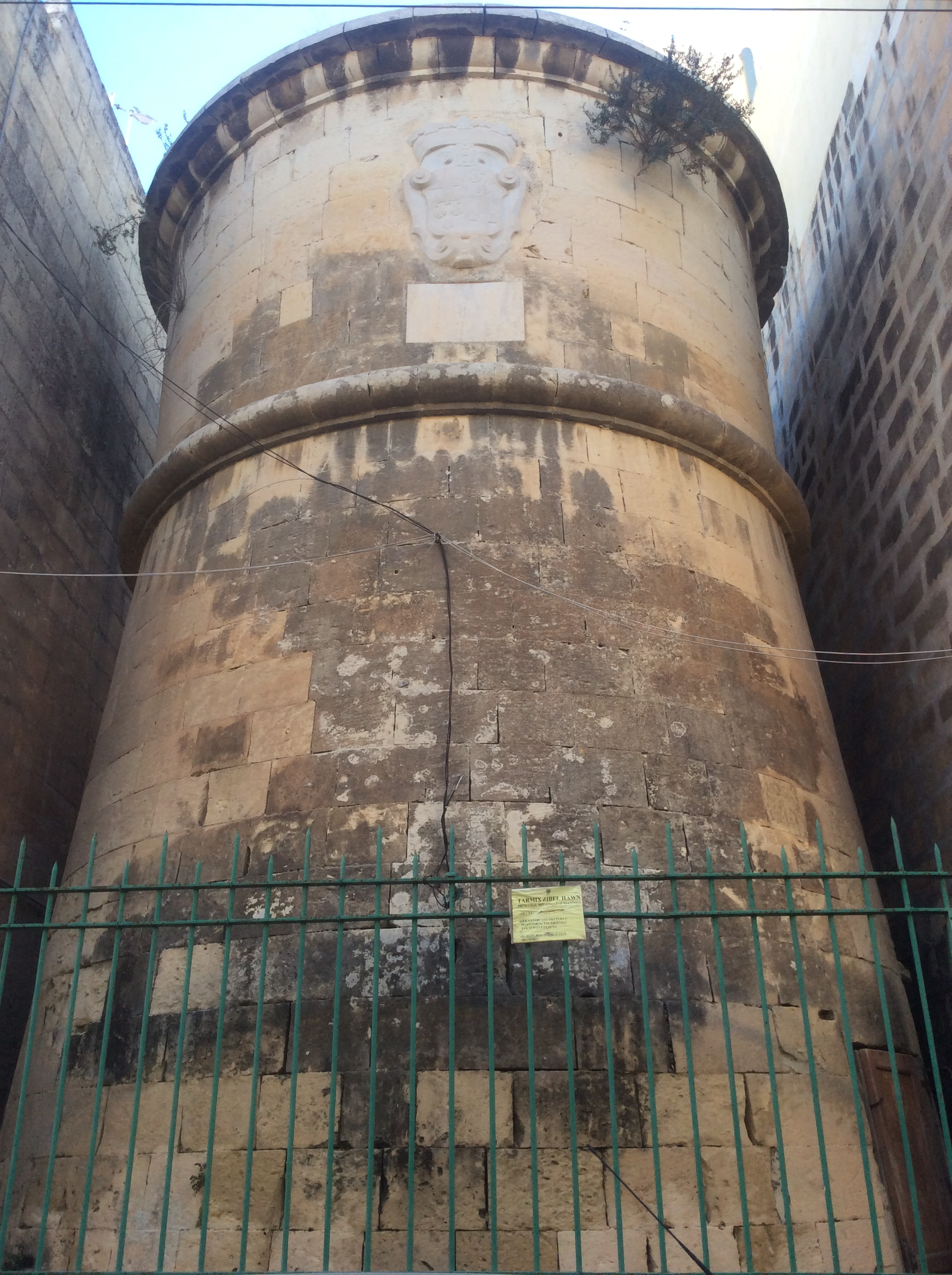
Il-Monument tat-Tromba at Hamrun

The second water inspection tower was built on the hill of St. Nicholas in Hamrun, and it is known as il-Monument tat-Tromba or it-Turretta ta' Atoċja. It has a round shape, and water originally flowed through an open tank in the tower. The tower contains the Wignacourt coat of arms and a commemorative inscription which reads:

VT SPIRITVS IN AQVIS
SIC SPIRITVS AB AQVIS.
(meaning As there is life in water, life started from water)

The tower still exists, but it is in a dilapidated state and surrounded by modern houses.

In 1780, when the aqueduct was improved by De Rohan, a commemorative obelisk was erected some distance away from the tower. It is now found in a private backyard. It has a coat of arms which was damaged in World War II, and an inscription which means:

Emmanuel De Rohan made this aqueduct stronger for the collection of water, with a newer one better built by the kind hearted Prince for the health of his people in the year 1780.

==== Floriana ====
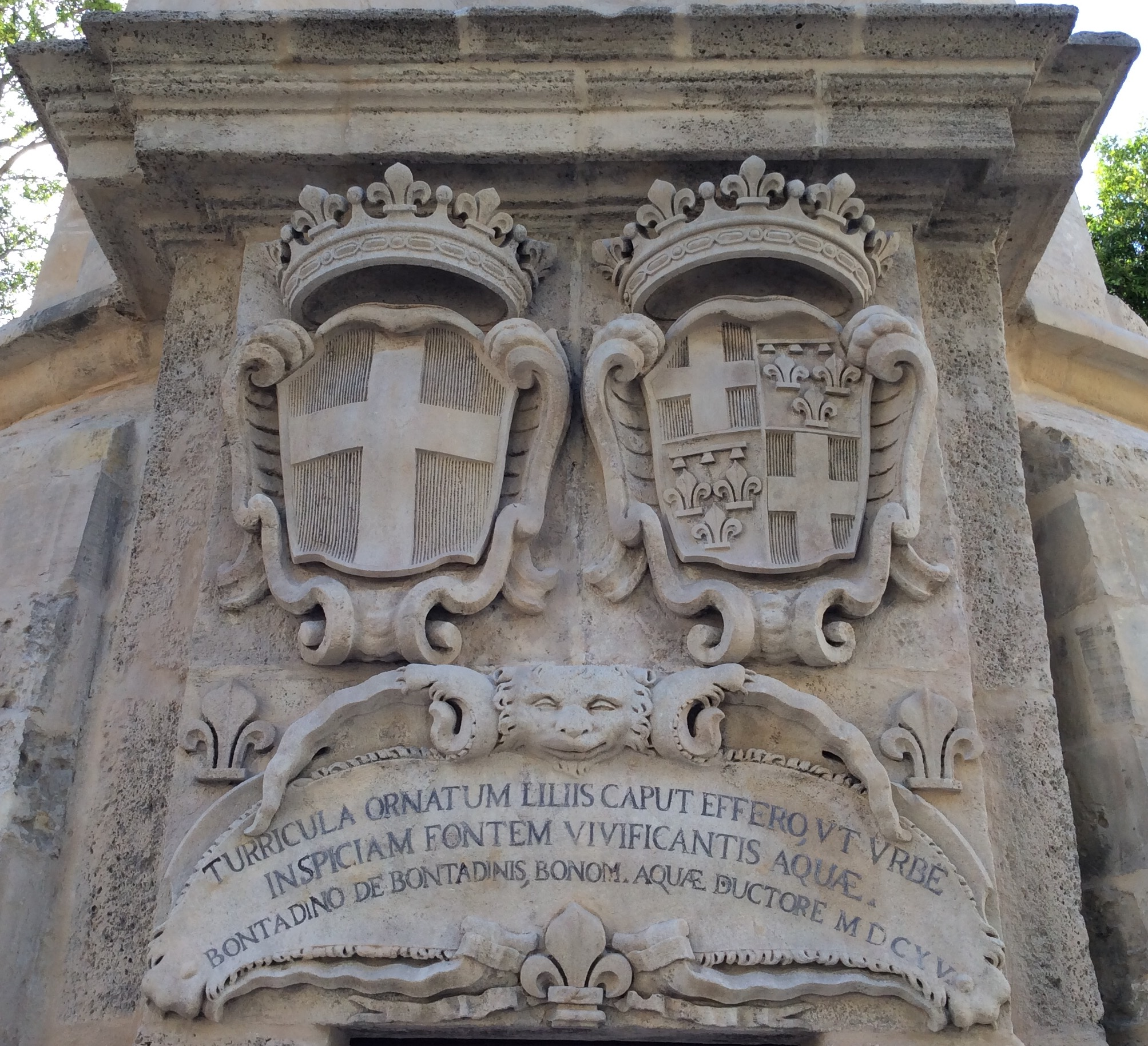
Inscription on the water tower

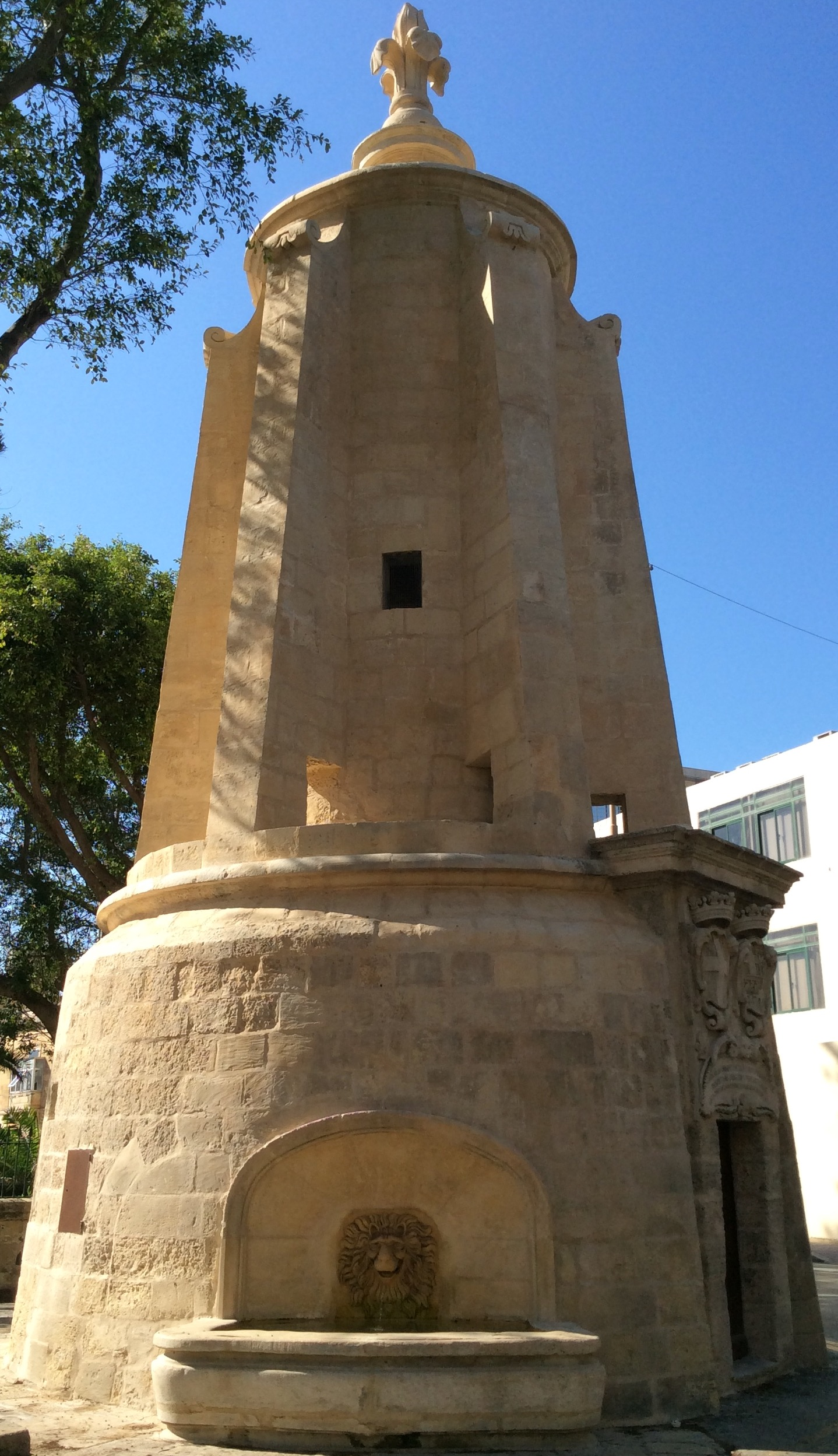
Wignacourt Water Tower at Floriana

The third and final water inspection tower was built in Floriana, and it became known as the Wignacourt Water Tower. It is located close to Argotti Botanical Gardens and the Sarria Church. It is a round structure supported by pilasters, and it also contains a fountain and a horse trough. The top of the tower contains a sculpted fleur-de-lis, and it is also decorated with the coat of arms of the Order of St. John and the personal arms of Wignacourt. Below the coats of arms is the following inscription:

TURRICULA ORNATUM LILIIS CAPUT EFFERO VT VRBE
INSPICIAM FONTEM VIVIFICANTIS AQUÆ.
BONTADINO DE BONTADINIS, BONOM. AQUÆ DUCTORE MDCXV.

The tower was included on the Antiquities List of 1925. The tower has been a grade 1 scheduled property since 1994.

The tower was restored between June 2015 and June 2016 by the Ministry for Transport and Infrastructure. The lion relief, pouring water, that is part of the water trough (which is attached to the fountain) has eroded over the years and was replaced with a replica in 2016. The interior consists of a spiral staircase which was also restored in 2016.

=== Fountains ===
With the completion of the Wignacourt Aqueduct, many fountains supplied by water from the aqueduct were built in Valletta.

==== Wignacourt fountain and Pinto renovation ====
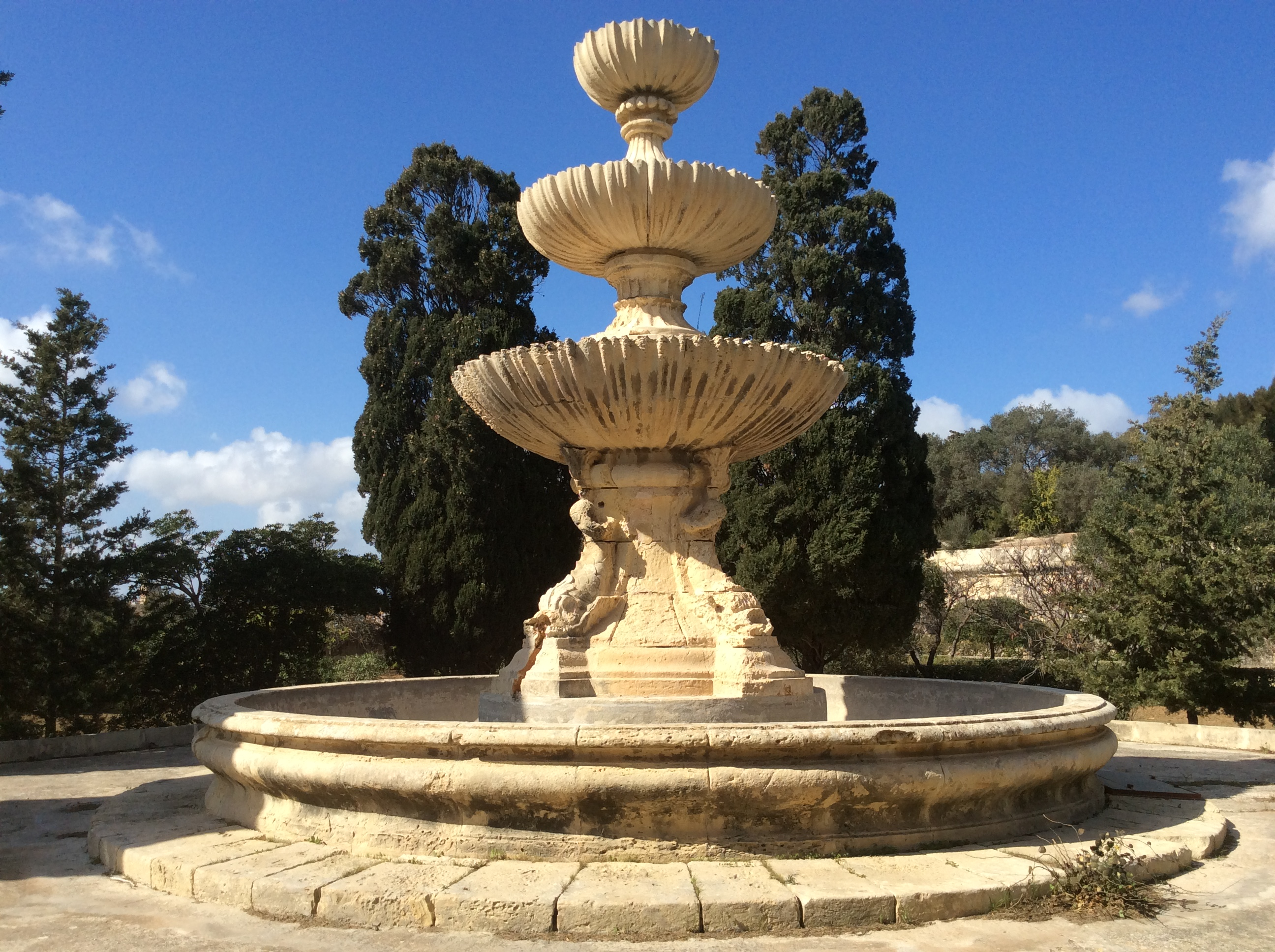
Fountain rebuild in St. Philip's Gardens, Floriana, is claimed to be the original built by Wignacourt – except the top basin

===== First interpretation =====
The "first" fountain which was connected to the aqueduct is the Wignacourt Fountain, then located in St. George's Square in Valletta, facing the Grandmaster's Palace. It was officially inaugurated on 21 April 1625, marking the arrival of water in Valletta. This fountain was symbolic of Wignacourt as, similar to the other monuments of the aqueduct, it had a Fleur-des-Lis on top. There is an early 18th century painting of the square with this fountain included. The inauguration ceremony of the aqueduct on 21 April 1615 was held at this fountain. The original fountain was Baroque but less decorated and was ordered to be demolished on 2 January 1745.

The "Pinto fountain" was inaugurated on 18 January 1746 by Grand Master Pinto. When the square became a parade ground for the British military, the fountain was first relocated close by to the Palace of Justice (later destroyed and replaced) and then to St. Philip's Gardens in Floriana, where it remains today. Architect Said says that the fountain was moved away by the knights, prior to British rule, as evidenced in some paintings.

===== Second interpretation =====
Other views say that the fountain was only renovated by Pinto and not destroyed. The missing Fleur-de-lis was removed at some point, and was replaced by an alternative. Originally the fountain had two basins while, with the addition, it now has three. The third basin was added much before deciding to relocate the Baroque fountain from the square.

The fountain consists of a large circular basin with three smaller seashell-like basins above it, supported on a pedestal containing sculpted dolphins. It is scheduled as a Grade 1 monument. The fountain has been restored after years of neglect.

==== Fountain at the Valletta Marina ====
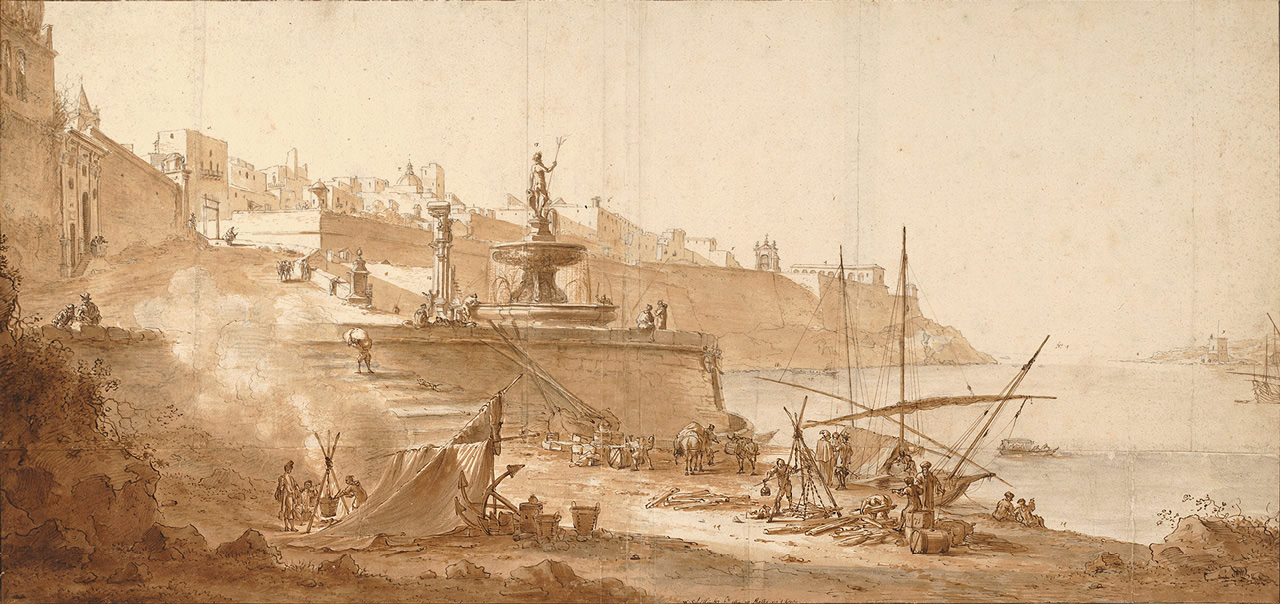
A painting of Neptune's Fountain at the original location in 1664.

Another fountain was located at Valletta's marina, just outside Del Monte Gate and near the fish market. It was depicted in a landmark view of Valletta in 1664.

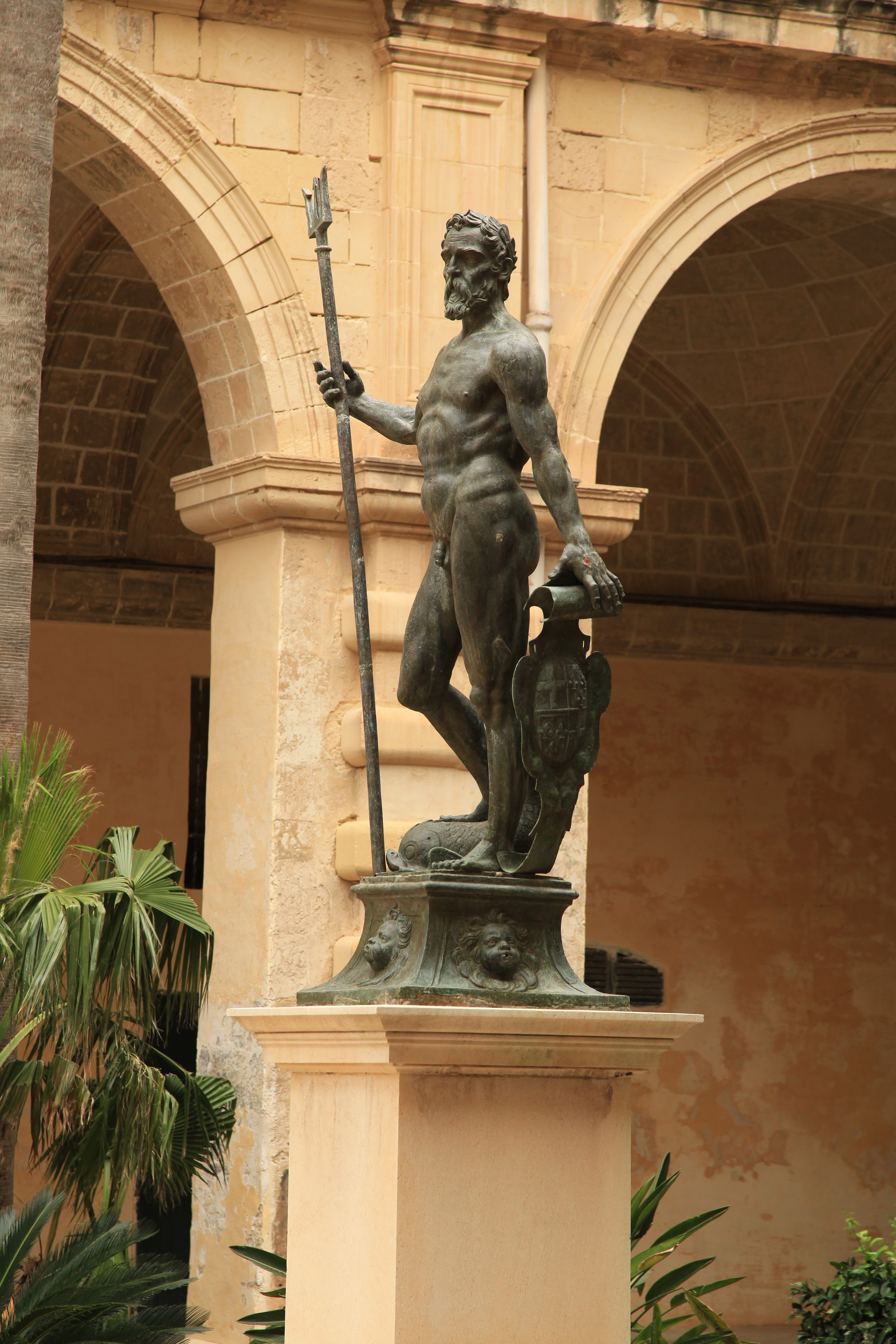
Statue of Neptune at the Grandmaster's Palace. It is a late 16th-century statue, given to the Grand Master in 1584. The Wignacourt's coat-of-arms is a later addition on orders of the Grand Master.

It had an ornate basin, a marble cannon barrel-shaped spout, topped by a bronze statue of Neptune holding a trident in one hand, with the other hand resting on an escutcheon containing the Wignacourt coat of arms. The statue is based on the Portrait of Andrea Doria as Neptune. Doria was an Italian Admiral of the Order of St John, praised for his role during sea battles against the Ottomans. The marble of the spout has a Latin inscription which says:

QUID PROPIUS PARVA DUBITAS ACCEDERE CYMBA?
NON VULCANUS INEST HEIC GLOBUS UNA THETIS.
(Why are you afraid little boat?
There is no fire here, but water instead of shot)

The statue was most likely sculpted by Leone Leoni in 1584. Other sources attribute it to Giovanni Bologna, a student of Michelangelo. The fountain supplied excess water from the Wignacourt Fountain to ships anchored at the Grand Harbour.

During the rule of the Order of St. John, the Grand Harbour was not equipped with a main breakwater, and this allowed the creation of strong sea waves in the harbour. A small breakwater was built next to the fountain to safeguard the boats loading water aboard in the 17th century. In 1686 strong waves destroyed the breakwater and caused extensive damage to the fountain. The damage prevented ships from using the water of the fountain, and consequently Grand Master Gregorio Carafa had to pay for renovation works. A commemorative inscription reads:

DOMINANTE EM. Fr. D. GREGORIO CARAFFA M.M.
TUTUM HOC CYMBARUM REFUGIUM
PROCELLIS RADICUTUS EVULSUM
SACRA REL. HIER. ERIGENDUM CURAVIT
ANNO SALUTIS MDCLXXXVI.

The place remained a strategic location for harbouring fishing vessels and selling fish. The fountain remained intact after the departure of the knights in 1798. The fountain is featured in an 1840 watercolour painting by Jean Nicholas Henry de Chacaton. By the 19th century it was dismantled and replaced by a closed fishing market. This also became defunct by 1937 marking the end of use of site but moved few metres away.

In 1858, the statue of Neptune was relocated by Governor Le Gaspard to the Grandmaster's Palace lower courtyard, which is now also known as Neptune's Courtyard. The fountain spout is now located at the Malta Maritime Museum in Birgu.

The statue of Neptune is often described as a giant. The area around the original location of the fountain remained known as fuq l–iġgant (on the giant) until well into the 20th century.

The Perellos Fountain was once also at the Valletta Marina and is now found under the loggia of the Palace of the Grand Master.

==== Omnibus Idem fountain ====
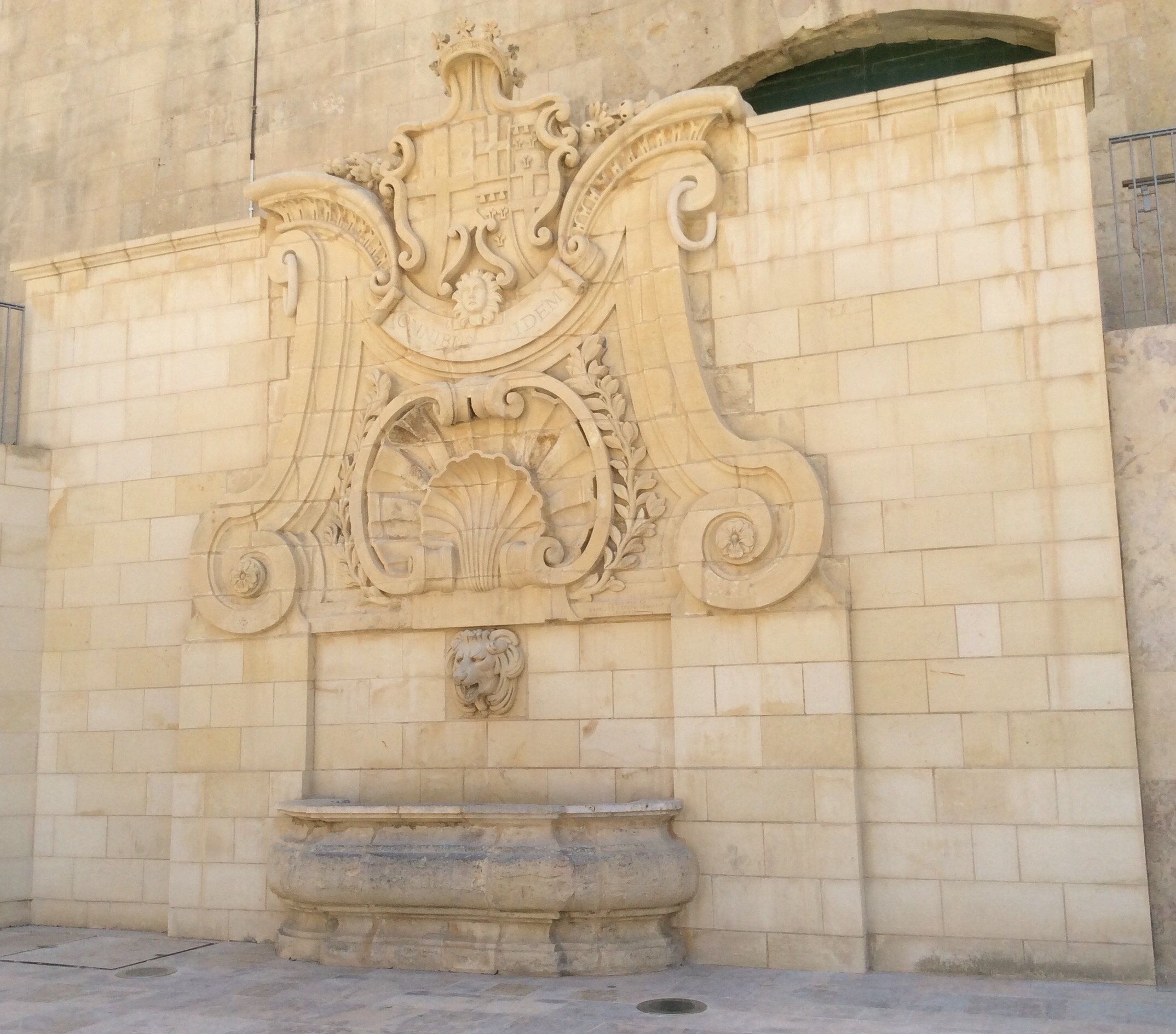
Omnibus Idem fountain

Another fountain, sometimes also known as the Wignacourt Fountain, was built close to Porta Reale in Valletta attached to the Ferreria building (demolished). It consists of a lion's head pouring out water into a stone basin, topped by the coat of arms of Wignacourt and the Order and surrounded by a garland of flowers and interlocking seashells. Below the coats of arms is a radiating sun with the inscription Omnibus Idem (meaning the same to all), indicating that the water was freely available to everyone.

This fountain was relocated a number of times throughout its history: first in 1874 when the building near which it was built was demolished to build Palazzo Ferreria, in the 1960s when the City Gate was rebuilt, in 2000 when Saint James Cavalier was renovated and converted into a cultural centre, and again in the early 2010s during the City Gate Project. Due to these relocations and renovations, nothing remains of the original fountain.

=== Other fountains ===
Other fountains built in subsequent centuries, such as the Lion Fountain in Floriana, which was built in 1728 during the magistracy of António Manoel de Vilhena, were also supplied by water from the aqueduct.

== Commemorations ==
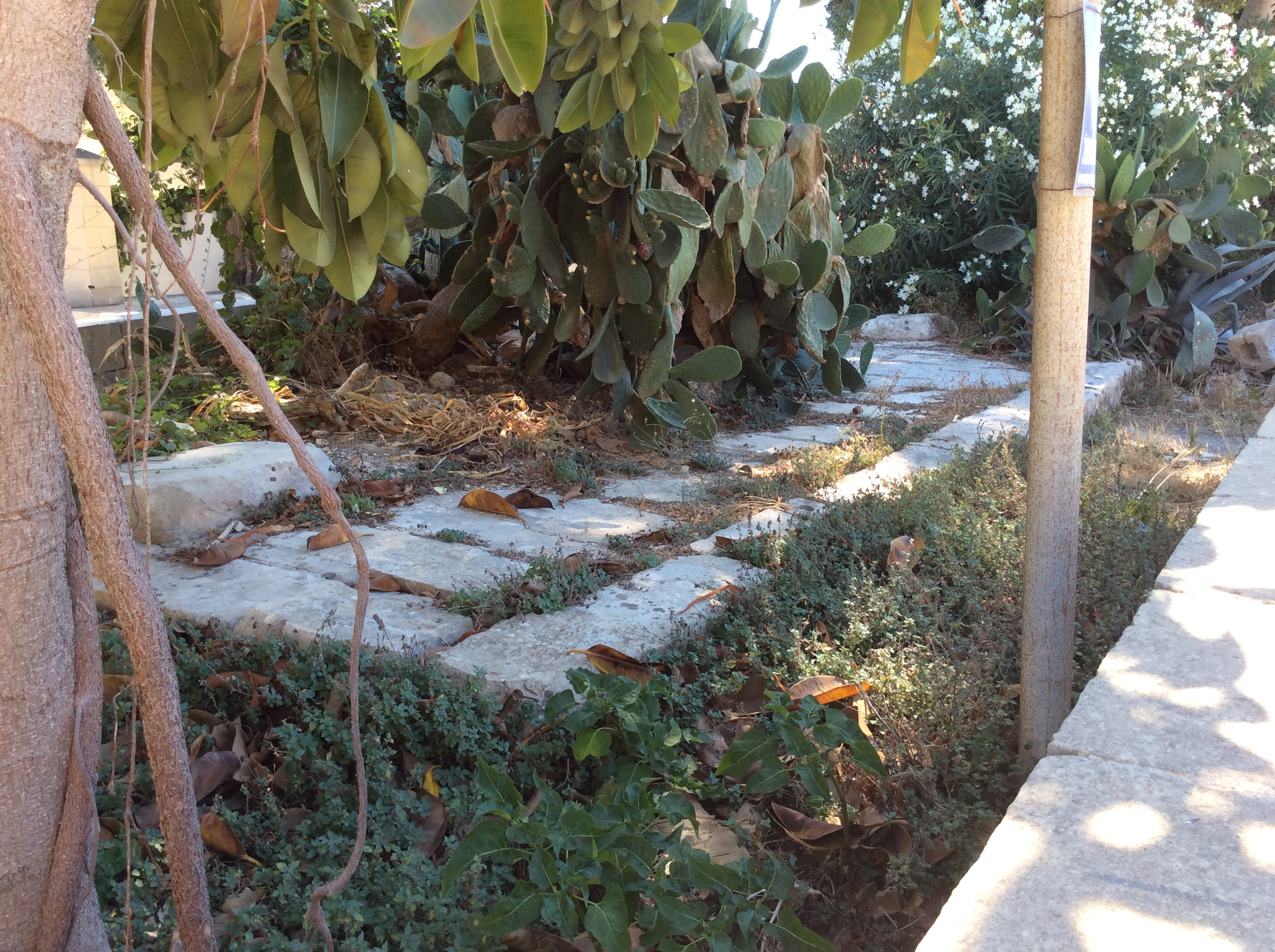
The beginning of the aqueduct above ground at Attard

The aqueduct is featured on a ceiling at the Archbishop's Palace in Valletta. At the National Library of Malta is a painting, next to Vilhena's Cabreo, which portrays some of Valletta's engineering water storage technique.

The 400th anniversary of the aqueduct was commemorated on 21 April 2015. A ceremony was held in Valletta, with school children carrying water from City Gate to St. George's Square, where a reenactment of the inauguration of the aqueduct was held.

The anniversary was also commemorated by a silver coin minted by the Central Bank of Malta. The coin shows the aqueduct on the reverse and Grandmaster Wignacourt on the obverse.

MaltaPost also issued a set of two stamps on 21 April 2015. The stamps show Wignacourt Arch and the Wignacourt Water Tower in Fleur-de-Lys and Floriana respectively.

== See also ==
- Gozo Aqueduct
