= Bontadino de Bontadini =

Bolognese hydraulic engineer, architect, mathematician and wood carver

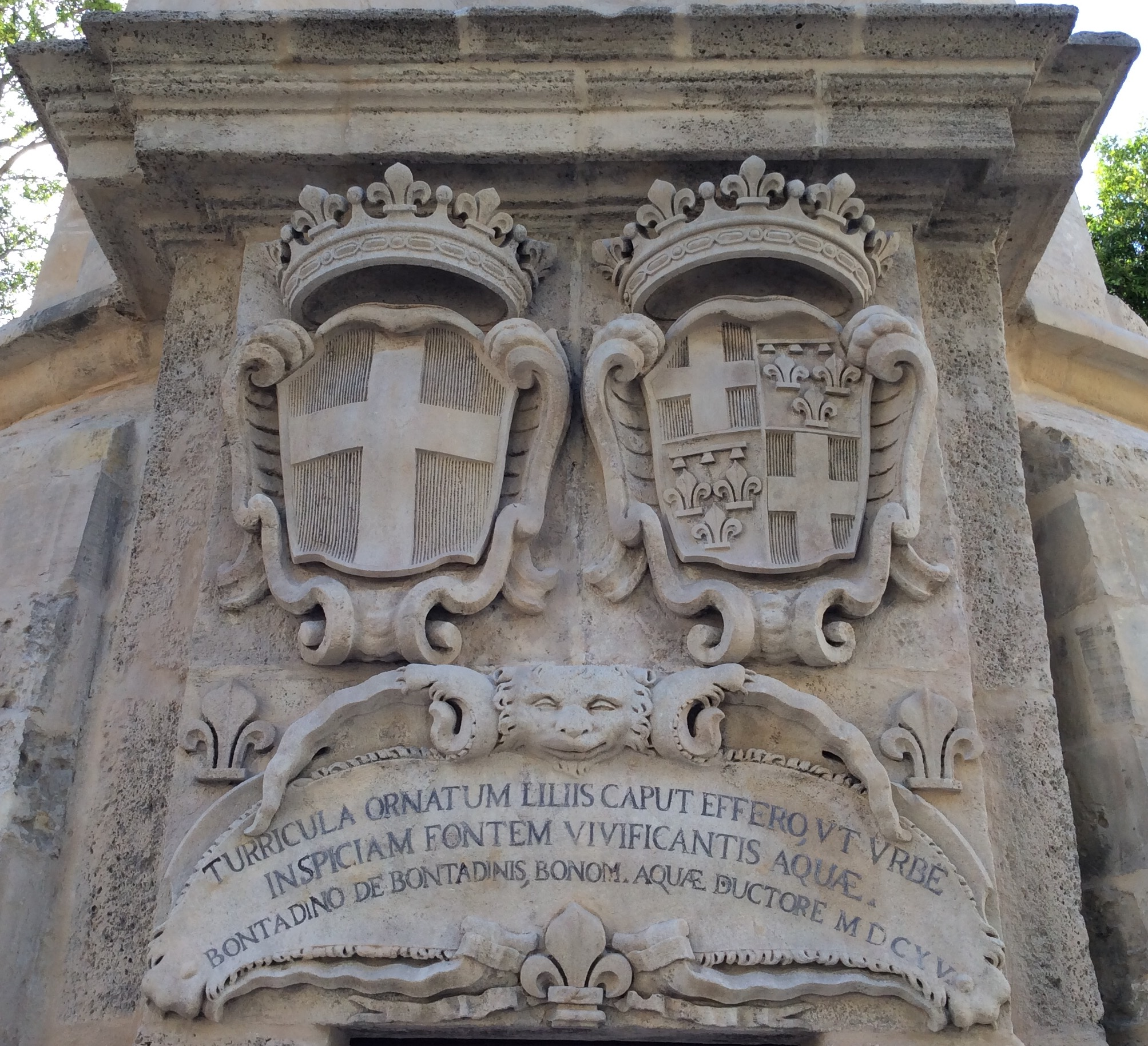
Inscription at the Wignacourt Water Tower in Floriana, Malta, making a reference to Bontadino de Bontadini

Vittorio Bontadini, better known as Bontadino de Bontadini (died 1620), was a Bolognese hydraulic engineer, architect, mathematician and wood carver. He is mostly known for designing the Wignacourt Aqueduct in Malta.

The Order of St. John had been trying to build an aqueduct to supply their capital city Valletta since 1596. In early 1612, engineer Natale Tomasucci left the island after being unable to solve the problem of how water would flow at Attard at points where the ground level dropped. In July of that year, Bontadini took over the project, possibly on the recommendation of Inquisitor Evangelista Carbonesi, who was also from Bologna. Bontadini adopted the idea of Giovanni Attard and other capomastri to construct arches along depressions in the ground, and run the aqueduct through pipes in the arches. His most significant contribution to the project was the idea to use pozzolana to make the pipes waterproof. The aqueduct was completed three years later, being inaugurated on 21 April 1615.

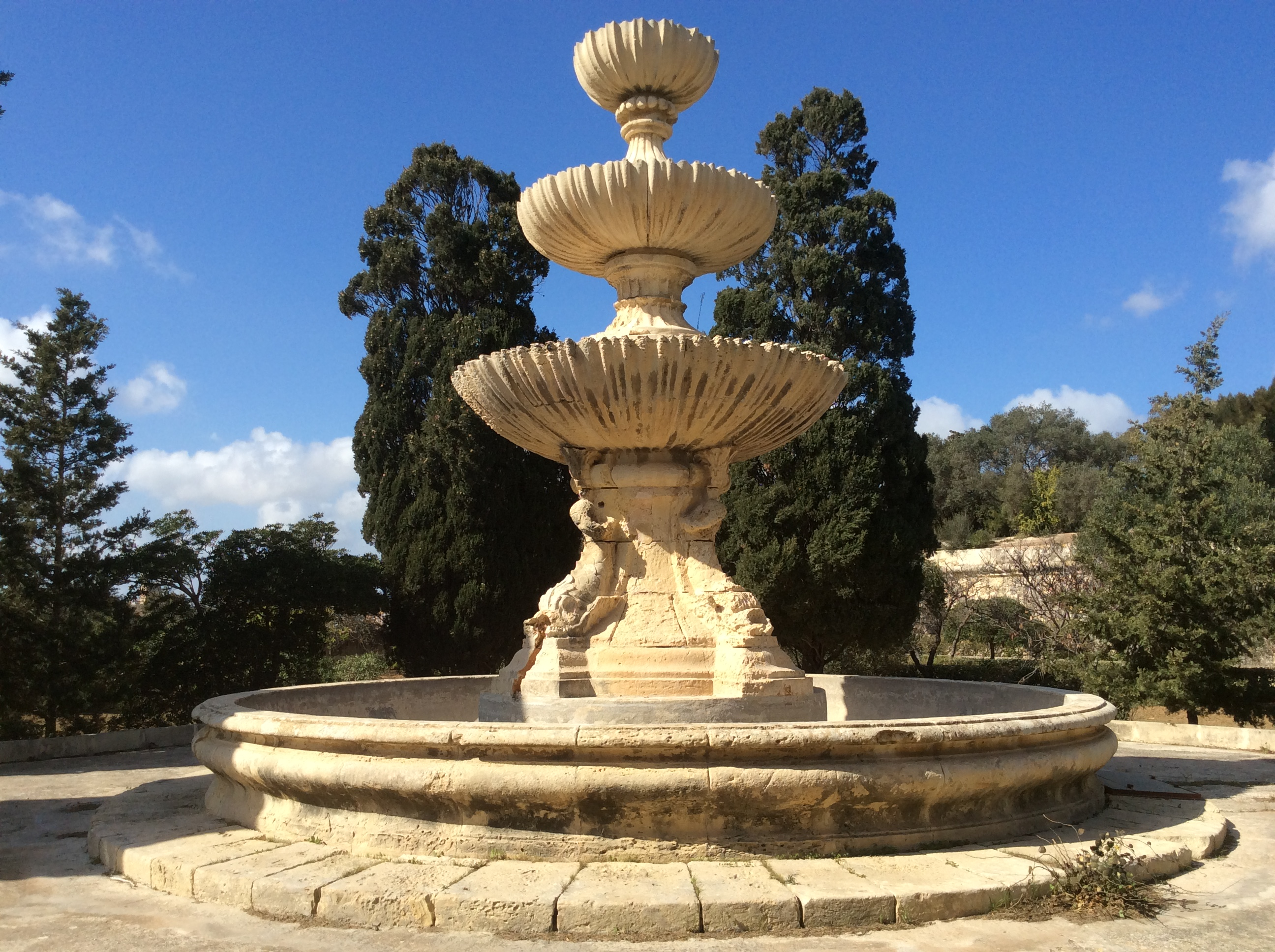
The Wignacourt Fountain, which was probably designed by Bontadini

Bontadini's role in constructing the aqueduct was commemorated by Grand Master Alof de Wignacourt by several inscriptions on fountains and other parts of the aqueduct. The inscriptions usually went along the lines of:

BONTADINO DE BONTADINIS, BONON AQUÆ DUCTORE MDCXV.

(meaning Bontadino de Bontadini from Bologna is he who delivered the waters 1615.)

According to historian Giovanni Bonello, Bontadini was the first architect to introduce the Baroque style in Malta, having designed the Wignacourt Arch and various fountains and other decorative elements within the aqueduct.

In 1620, Bontadini was murdered in Malta by Ferrante Marangio, an assassin who had been hired by three knights of the Order. The reason behind the assassination is not known.
