= Hompesch Gate =

Commemorative arch in Żabbar, Malta

- Il-Mina ta' Hompesch
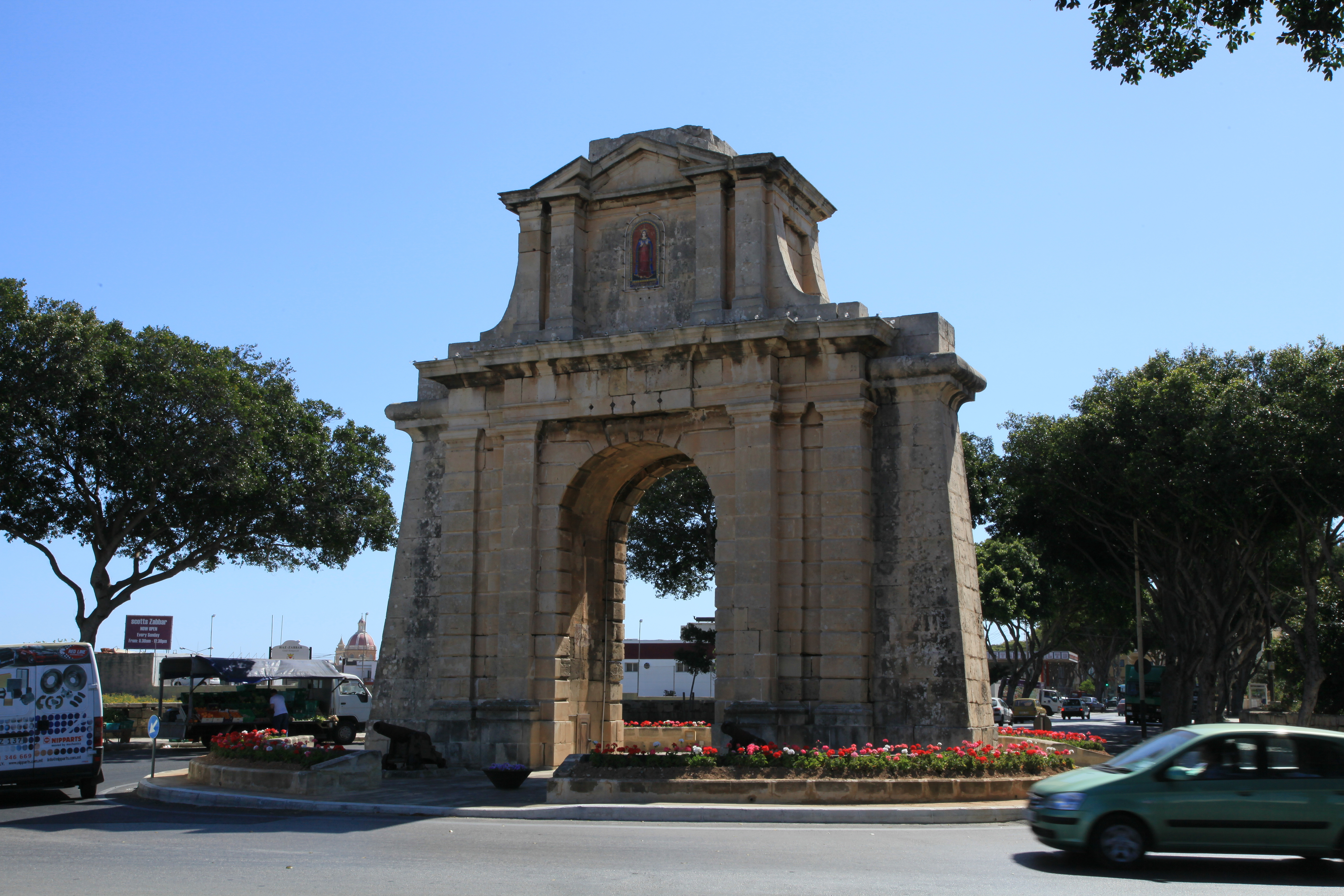
- View of the Hompesch Gate
- Interactive map of the Hompesch Gate area

General information
- Status: Intact
- Type: Commemorative arch
- Architectural style: Neoclassical
- Location: Żabbar, Malta
- Coordinates: 35°52′19.4″N 14°31′37.6″E
- Named for: Ferdinand von Hompesch zu Bolheim
- Completed: December 1801
- Owner: Government of Malta

Technical details
- Material: Limestone

The Hompesch Gate (Maltese: Il-Mina ta' Hompesch) is a commemorative arch in Żabbar, Malta. It was built in 1801 to commemorate the locality's status as a city, which had been granted by Grand Master Ferdinand von Hompesch zu Bolheim on 14 September 1797.

== History ==
Ferdinand von Hompesch zu Bolheim, the Grand Master of the Order of St. John, attended the feast of the village of Żabbar on 10 September 1797. The inhabitants welcomed the Grand Master's visit, and the parish priest, Don Carlo Caruana, requested that the village be elevated to the status of a city. Hompesch agreed and gave Żabbar the title Città Hompesch by a decree dated 14 September 1797.

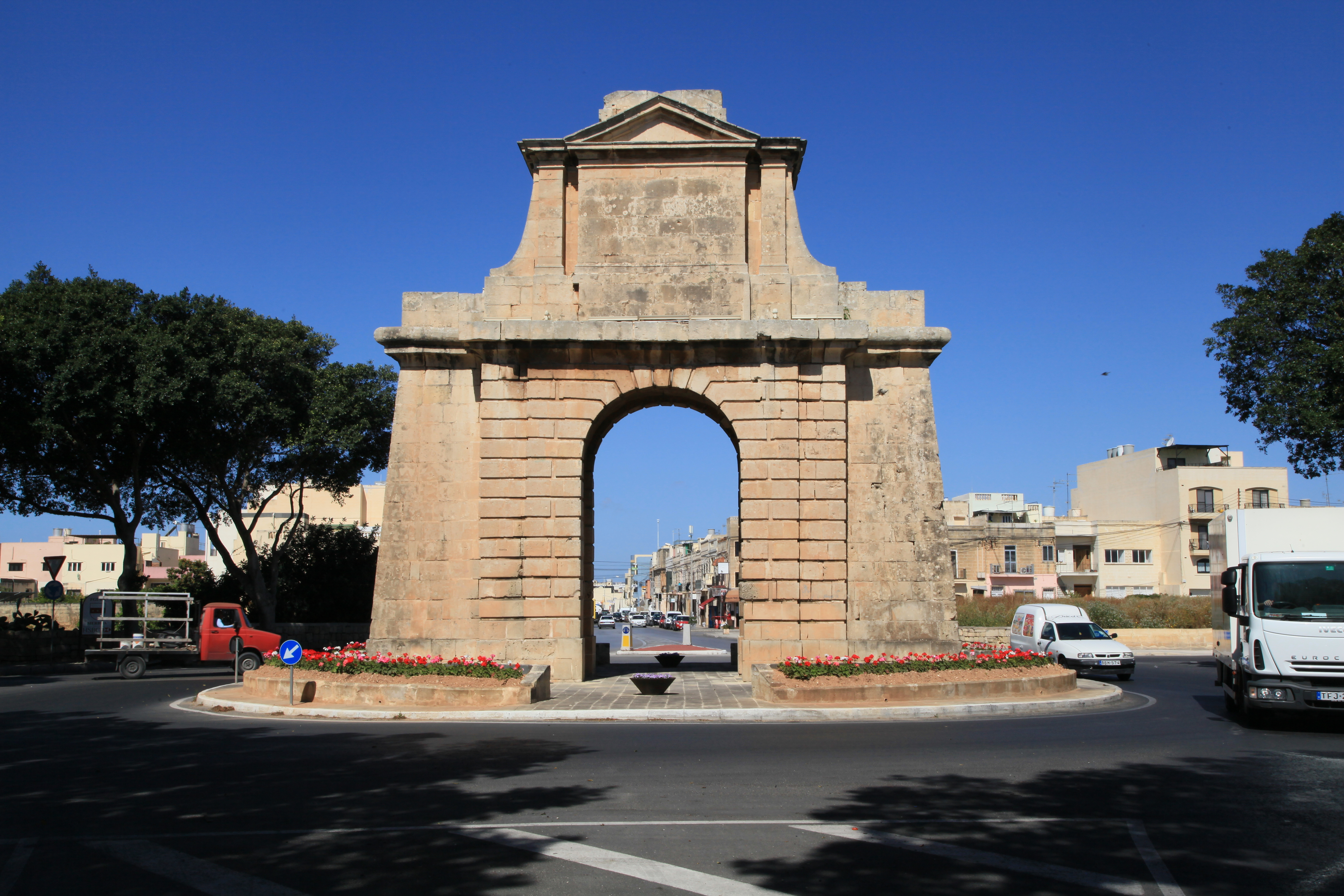
Hompesch Gate as viewed from the back

Following the elevation of their village to a city, the people of Żabbar wanted to build a monument to the Grand Master. In 1798, the French invasion of Malta expelled Hompesch and the Order from the island. The invasion was followed by a brief French occupation and a Maltese uprising, before Malta became a British protectorate in 1800. These political upheavals delayed the construction of a monument.

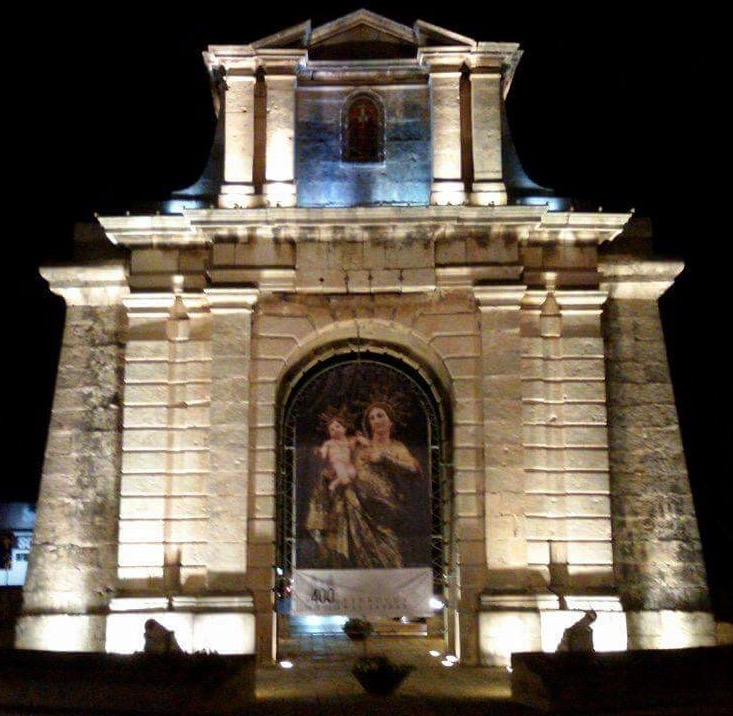
The gate illuminated at night

In December 1801, while repair works were being made to the Żabbar Sanctuary, Don Caruana decided to build the Hompesch Gate. The arch does not make any reference to the Grand Master or the Order, due to the sensitive political context in which it was constructed. An armorial crest was supposed to surmount the arch, and although the sculpture was begun it was never finished.

The Hompesch Gate was included on the Antiquities List of 1925. The arch is now scheduled as a Grade 1 national monument, and it is listed on the National Inventory of the Cultural Property of the Maltese Islands.

== Architecture ==
Hompesch Gate is built in the neoclassical style. It consists of a single arched opening, flanked by two pairs of Doric pilasters. The arch is topped by a triangular pediment, below which lies a depiction of Our Lady of Graces.

== See also ==
- De Rohan Arch
- List of post-Roman triumphal arches
