= Żabbar Sanctuary Museum =

- Mużew tas-Santwarju Żabbar
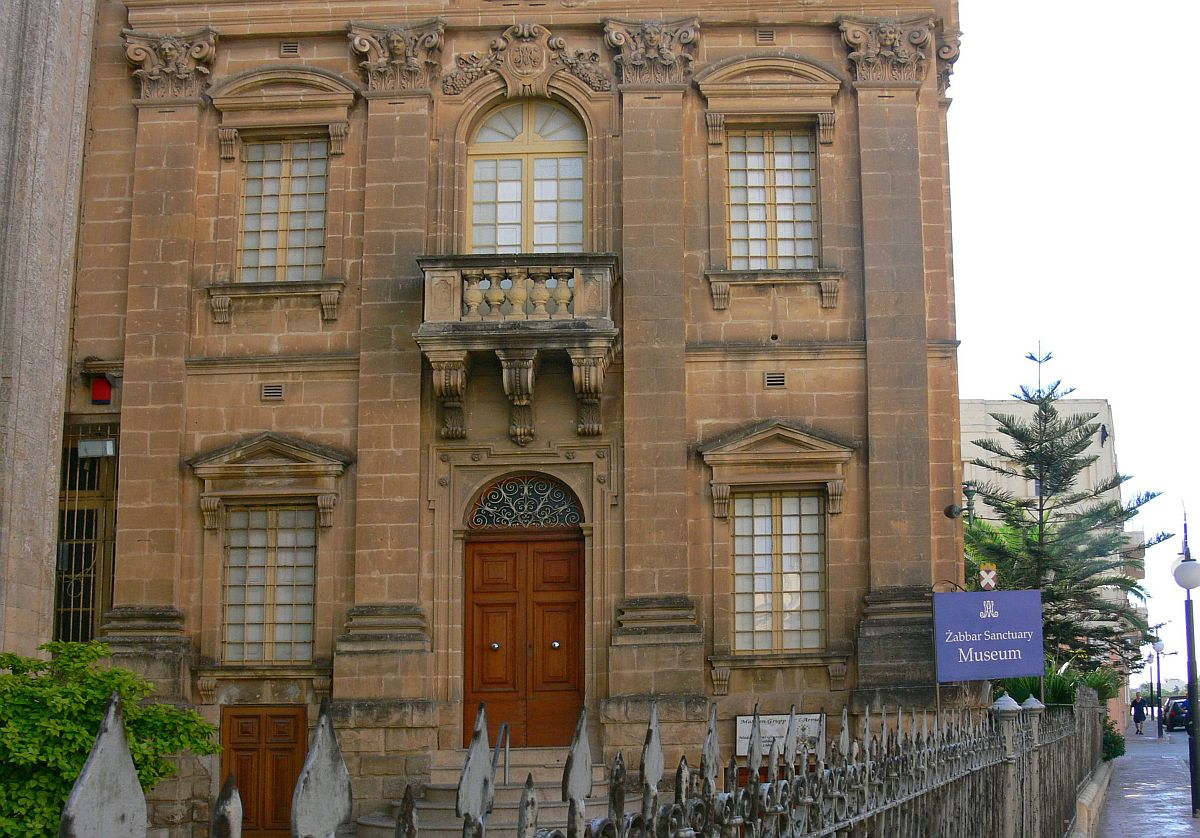
- Façade of the museum
- Established: 5 September 1954
- Location: Żabbar, Malta
- Coordinates: 35°52′29.45″N 14°32′01.80″E
- Type: Parish museum
- Key holdings: Religious, WWII and sea-related items
- Collections: Remains from pre-history, antique church fragments of architecture, ex-voto and sea-related items, documents/coins/postal stamps
- Collection size: Two floors and a platform
- Founder: Joseph Zarb
- President: Evan Caruana
- Owner: Żabbar Parish

The Żabbar Sanctuary Museum (Maltese: Mużew tas-Santwarju Żabbar) is the Parish museum of Żabbar, Malta, consisting of artifacts spanning from prehistory to modern contemporary. The majority of the belongings have a religious theme, while others are secular. It is a purposely built museum which during its planning met controversy over the exterior structure in a historic core, next to the parish church.

Built in the middle of the 20th century, it was renovated in 2003, and now has three floors of exhibits. It is run by a committee and a group of volunteers and headed by the Archpriest of Żabbar. The museum is open for three hours daily, from nine in the morning till noon, with a fee of two euro per person. Entrance fees and donations go for the upkeep of the museum and the preservation of the collection.

== History ==
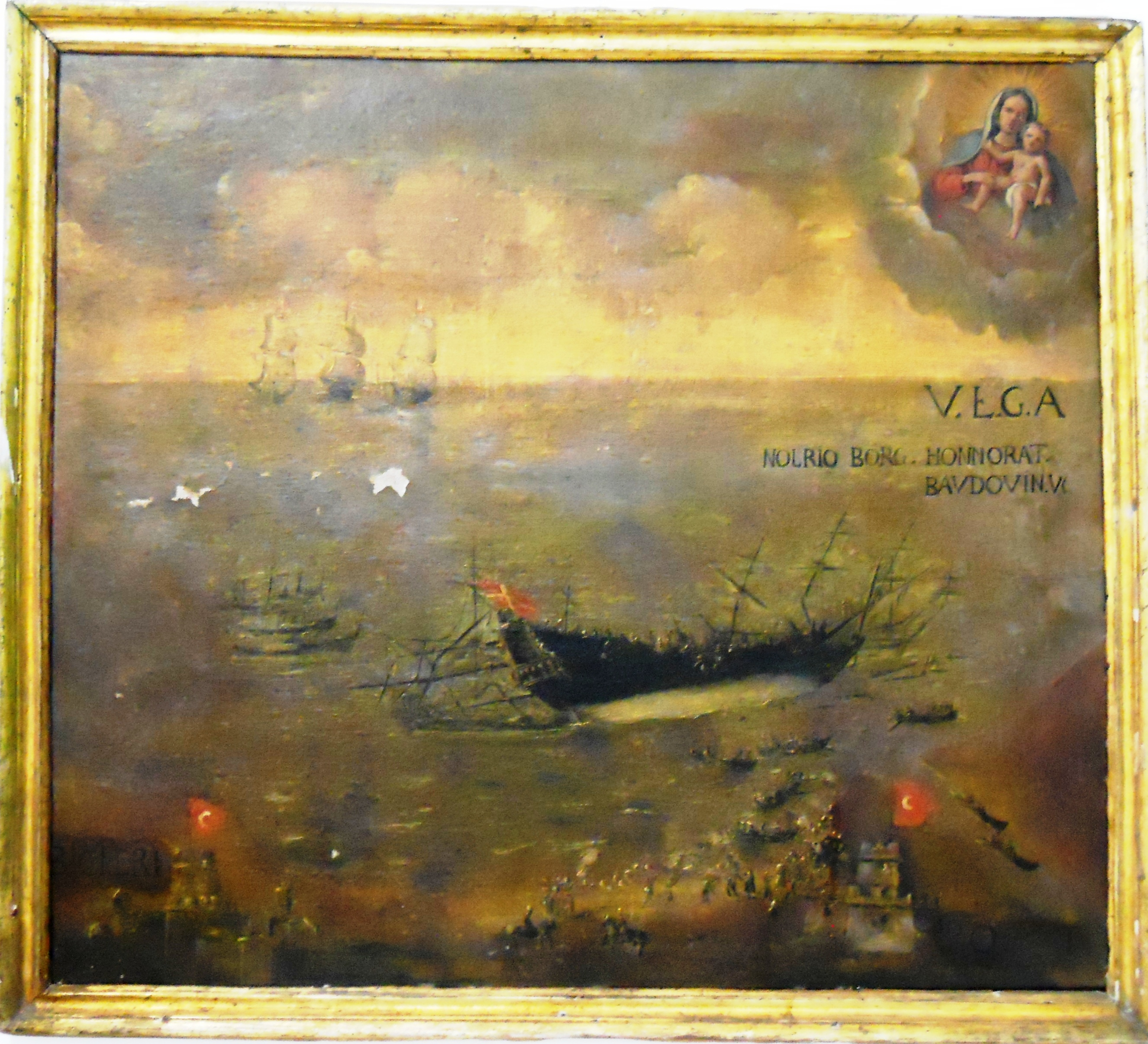
Ex-voto painting at the museum

The museum was founded by Monsignor Joseph Zarb. After Zarb was appointed as Parish priest of Żabbar, in 1943, he soon realized the opportunity the sanctuary of Our Lady of Graces gave in terms of authentic of historic artifacts. Being a researcher and a scholar, he listed all the belongings of the sanctuary – among which are weapons, slave chains, model ships, church vestments, altar fronts and votive paintings – which the Parish held. He later published the listed belongings in a book.

In the past, some of the heritage of the parish was underestimated, prior to the opening of the museum, and the whereabouts of some former belongings is unknown. At one point, the parish held about 300 ex-voto, now down to about 85 on display at the museum. The artifacts were mostly offerings to the patron of the village, Our Lady of Graces, collected throughout the years from people of various backgrounds. Most ex-voto were donated by members of the Order of St. John and other labourers on the galleys, who were seamen.

With the construction and opening of the museum, Zarb managed to house and preserve a large collection of artifacts, dating from pre-history, the Order of St. John, the French occupation of Malta, the British period, to 20th century Malta. Some 21st century items are also included.

In the mid-20th century, the sanctuary received an official visit by Bishop Mikiel Gonzi when he crowned both the Madonna and Baby Jesus, which are depicted on a venerable 18th century work of Our Lady of Graces.

== Exhibits ==
The museum's exhibits consist of donations made to the museum by individuals, artifacts and paintings that were formerly located in the sanctuary, and artifacts bought by auction. Selective exhibits at the museum include:

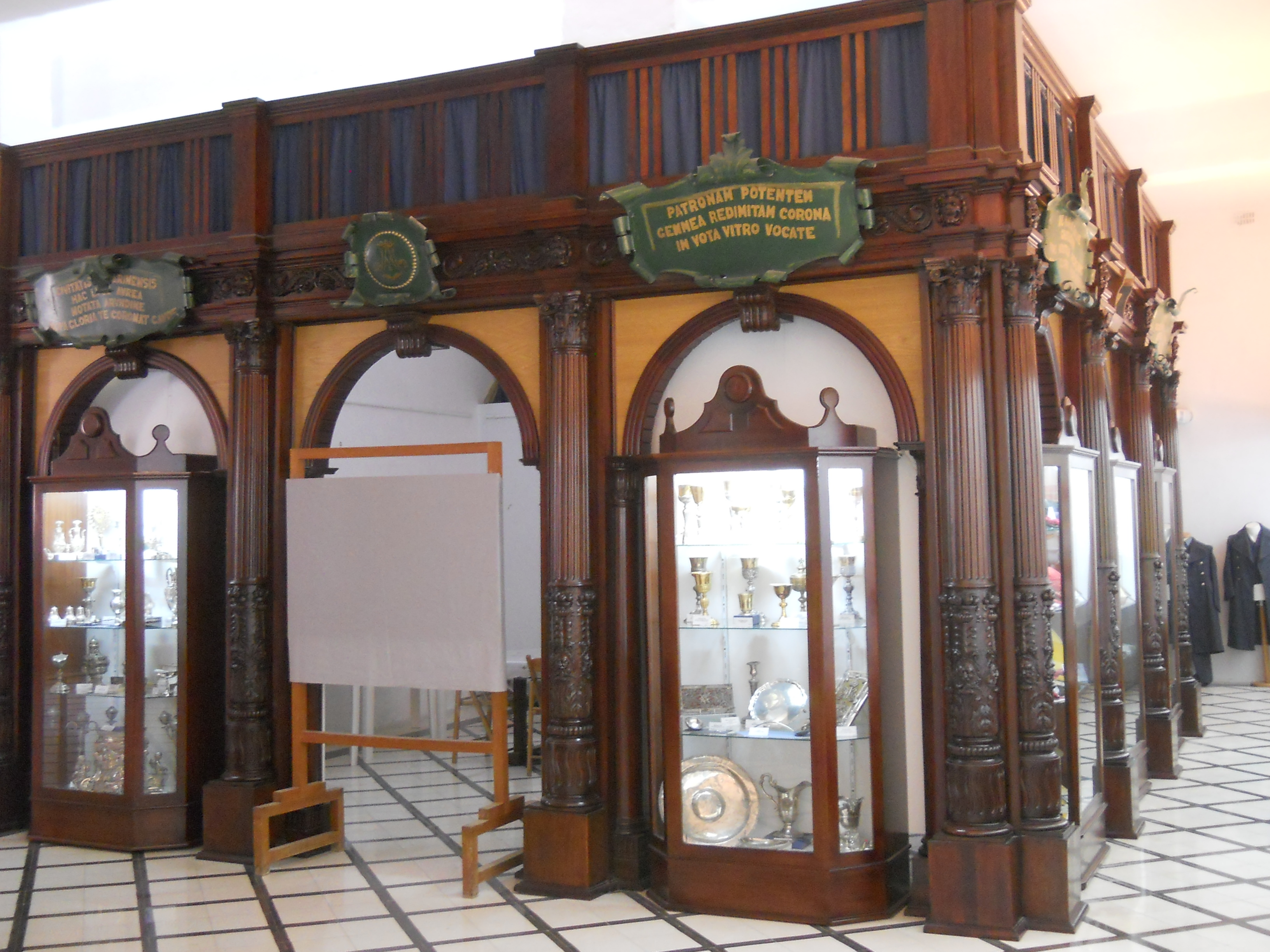
The Alcantara panels

- 85 ex-voto paintings, 74 of which are sea-related. This collection comprises the largest number of ex-votos in Malta that were given by the Knights of St. John;
- two sedan chairs, one used by Grand Masters Rafael and Nicolas Cotoner, and the other by Grand Master Ferdinand von Hompesch zu Bolheim who donated it to the sanctuary. He also donated two paintings, a Maltese clock exhibited in the museum and a full ceremonial knight's suit of armor decorated by aqua fortis technique;
- a contemporary painting of the carrack Santa Anna, and a naval school model of the ship of the line San Gioacchino of 1767;
- a medieval fresco of Our Lady of Graces found in St. Dominica's chapel in Żabbar, and a collection of medals and coins;
- a room dedicated to the 1975 Żabbar Avro Vulcan crash and WWII artifacts;
- mahogany wood panelling from the ship RMS Alcantara;
- a larger than usual portable altar.
- A plague hearse used during the 1813 outbreak.

=== Paintings ===
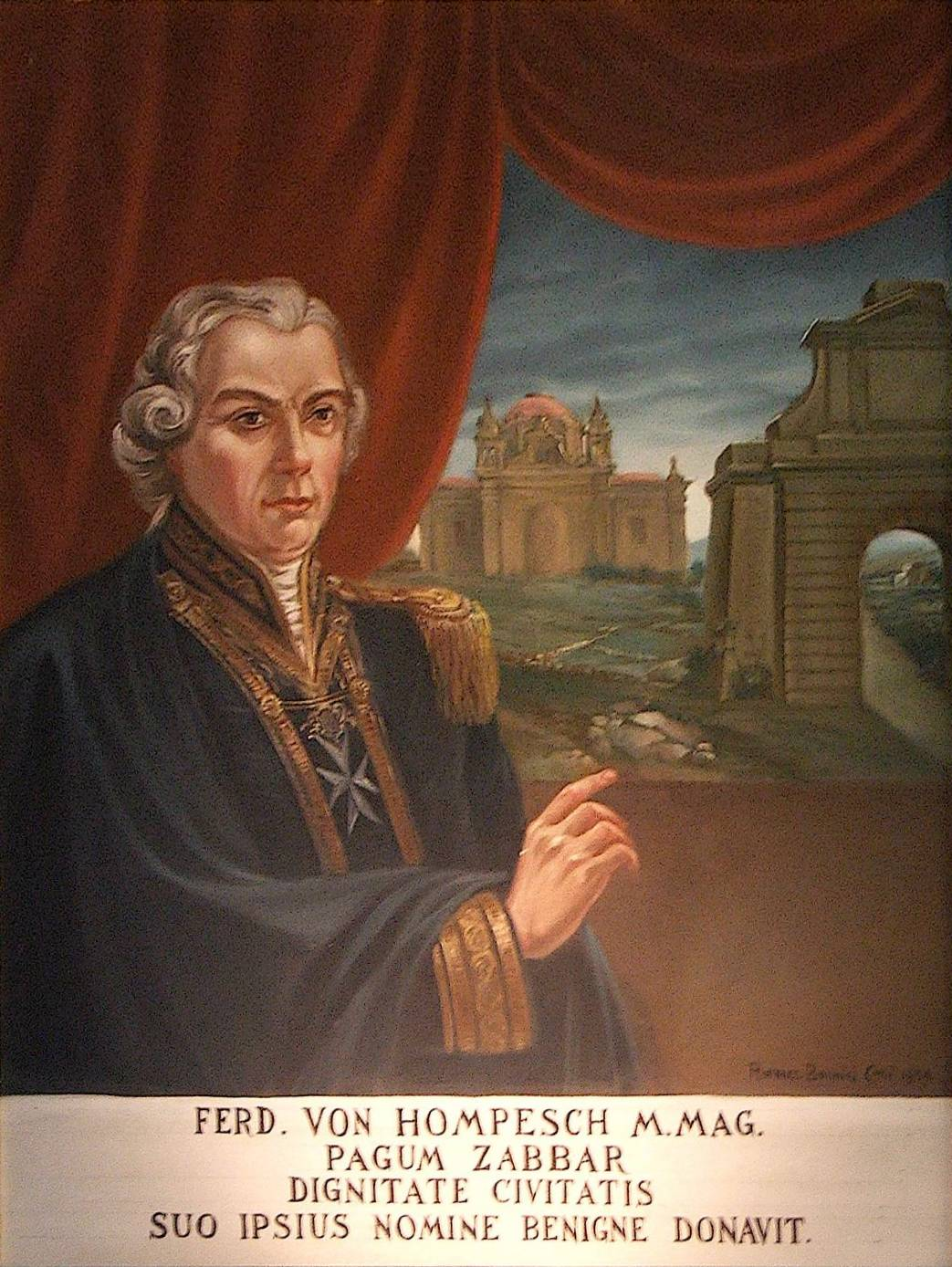
Painting of Grand Master Ferdinand von Hompesch zu Bolheim at the museum

Various works of art are exhibited in the museum, most of them with a religious theme as they were formerly in the sanctuary. The paintings include works by Rocco Buhagiar, Gio Nicola Buhagiar, Rafel Bonnici Calì, Michele Busuttil, Tousaint Busuttil, Giuseppe Calì, Giuseppe Maria Caruana, Giovanni Battista Conti, Giuseppe D'Arena, Stefano Erardi, Rafael Gagliardi, Tommaso Madiona, Mattia Preti, Italo Horatio Serge, Filippo Venuti and Francesco Zahra.

Other paintings in the museum were donated by individuals. Two of them are the 1683 Battle of Vienna, and another depicting the port of Messina in the 18th century. Also there are bozzetti of paintings in the sanctuary.

== Building ==
In 1952, plans were made to build a museum adjacent to the parish church to exhibit the artifacts. The post-war Baroque exterior design of the museum building faced some controversy from the planning authority, however the permit was subsequently approved. The first stone was laid on 2 September 1952. On 5 September 1954, the museum was officiated by Jackie Frendo Azzoppardi and blessed by Monsignor Emmanuel Galea. It is the second Parish museum, after the Cathedral Museum in Mdina, and the first purposely build museum in Malta. In 2003, the museum was reopened after being closed for renovation at the initiative of parish priest Anton Cassar. The belongings are now spread over the two floors of the building, and a platform at the first floor.

=== Administration ===
The museum is the responsibility of the Parish of Żabbar. A commission of six volunteers, and the current Parish priest serving as president, direct its everyday operation, including the upkeep and restoration of the belongings. The museum's income derives from public donations.

The museum is generally open daily, for three hours, between 9 am and noon.
