= De Rohan Arch =

Commemorative arch in Żebbuġ, Malta

- Il-Bieb De Rohan
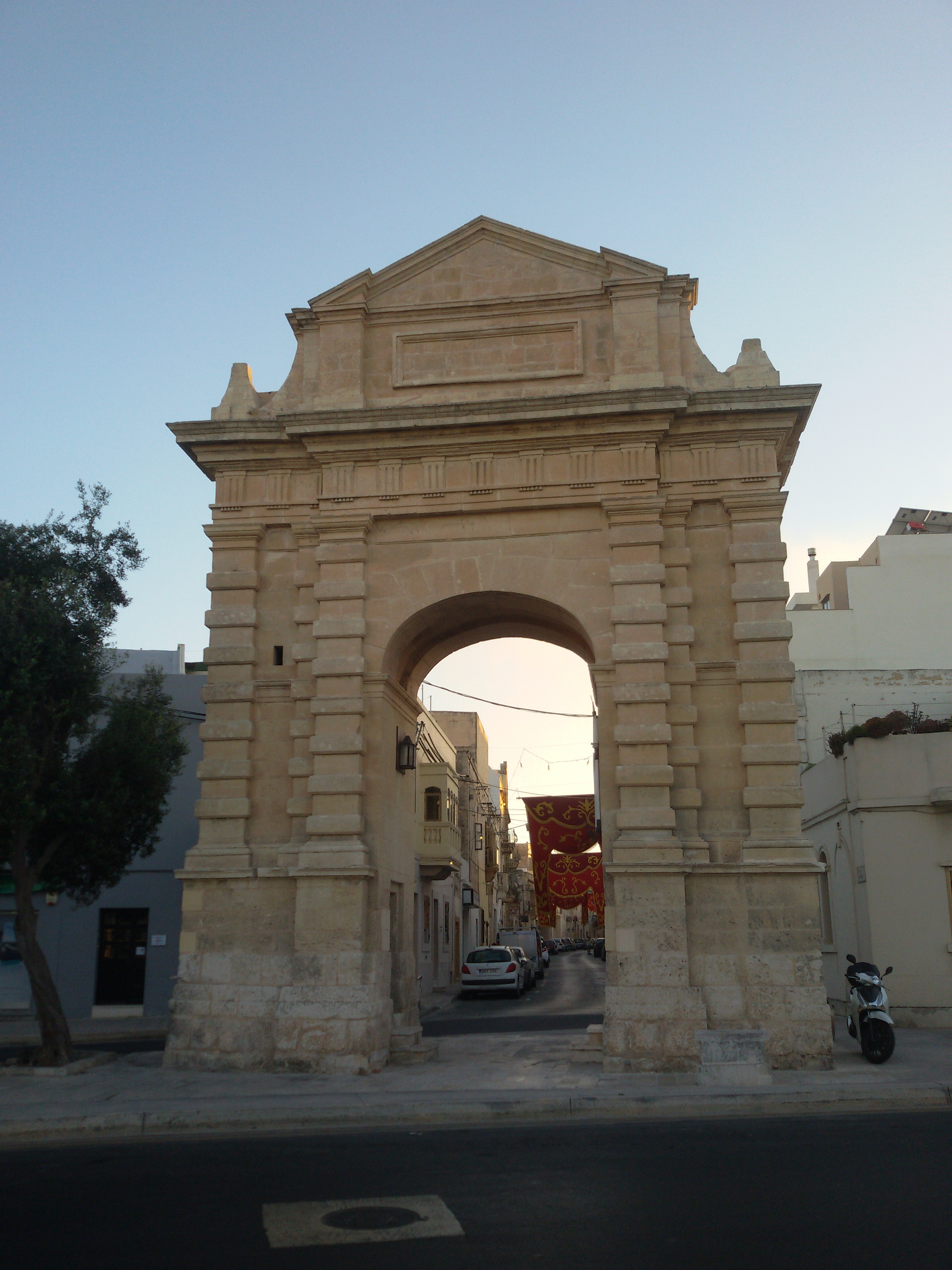
- De Rohan Arch after restoration
- Alternative names: New Gateway (Il-Bieb il-Ġdid)

General information
- Status: Intact
- Type: Commemorative arch
- Architectural style: Neoclassical
- Location: Żebbuġ, Malta
- Coordinates: 35°52′25.7″N 14°26′53″E
- Named for: Emmanuel de Rohan-Polduc
- Inaugurated: 12 May 1798
- Cost: 1000 scudi

Technical details
- Material: Limestone

Design and construction
- Architect: Giuseppe Xerri

The De Rohan Arch (Maltese: Il-Bieb De Rohan; Italian: Porta De Rohan), also known as the New Gateway (Maltese: Il-Bieb il-Ġdid), is a commemorative arch in Żebbuġ, Malta. It was built in 1798 to commemorate the locality's status as a city, which had been granted by Grand Master Emmanuel de Rohan-Polduc on 21 June 1777.

== History ==
Emmanuel de Rohan-Polduc, the Grand Master of the Order of St. John, attended the feast of the village of Żebbuġ on 12 May 1776. The parish priest Dun Feliċ Borg sent a petition to the Grand Master, requesting that the village be elevated to the status of a city. Borg promised to construct two triumphal arches if the request was accepted. De Rohan agreed and gave Żebbuġ the title Città Rohan by a decree dated 21 June 1777.

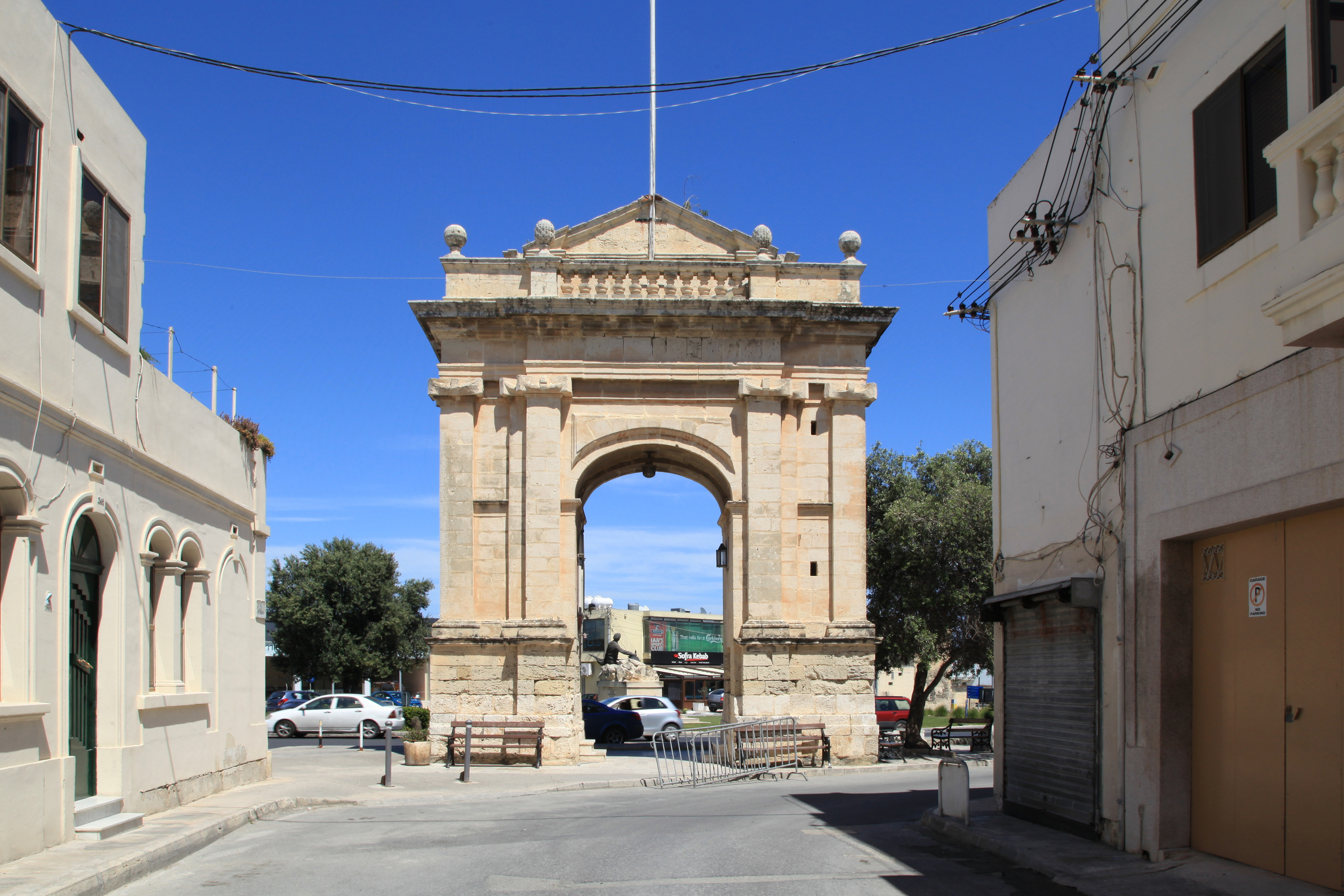
De Rohan Arch as viewed from the back

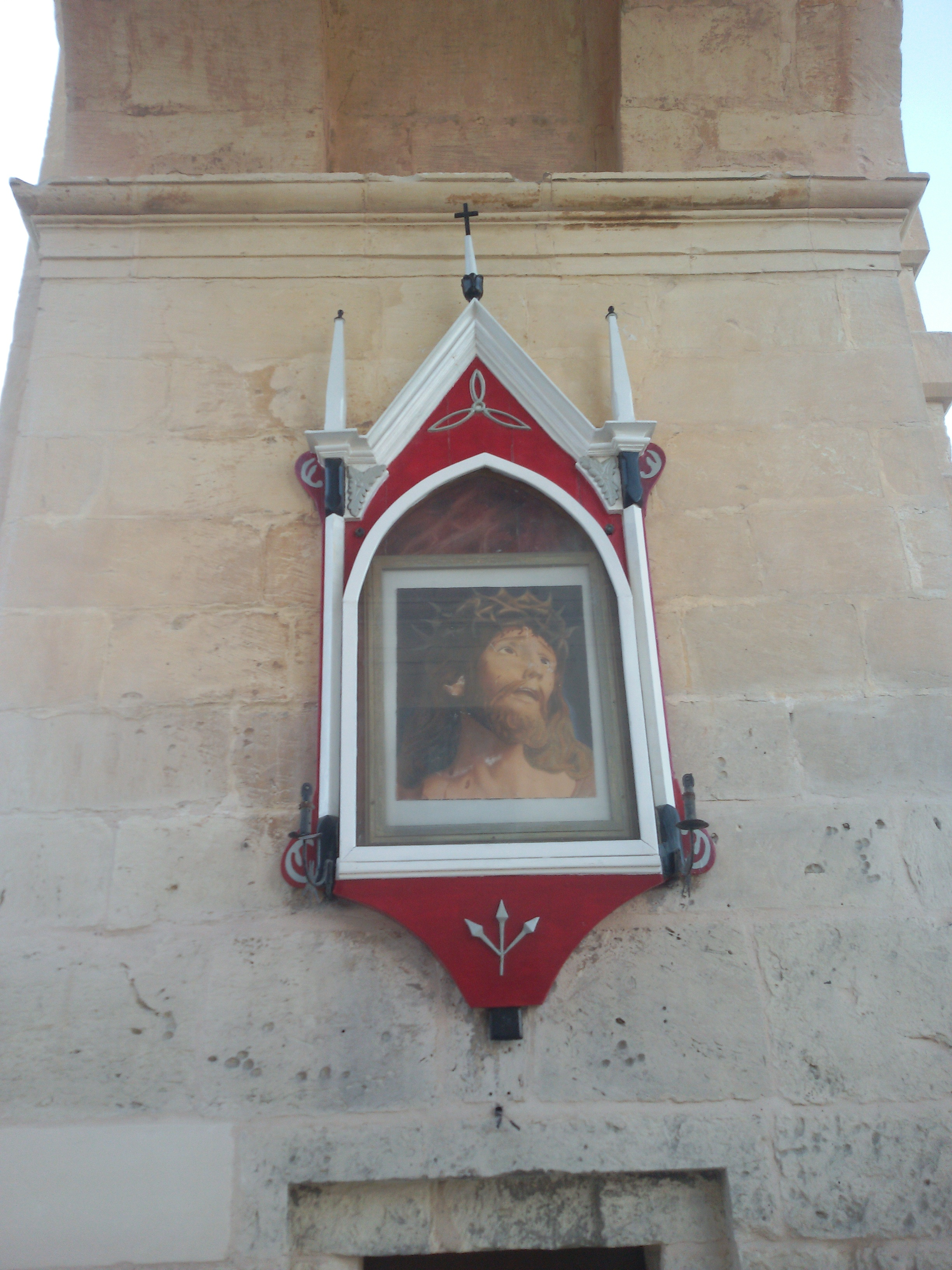
The niche of the Ecce Homo, installed on the arch

Although city status was granted, the two arches were not built due to several difficulties. De Rohan died on 14 July 1797, and the people decided to build a single arch at the entrance to the city, partially fulfilling the promise they had made twenty years earlier. The arch cost about 1,000 scudi to build, and funds were raised through fundraising by the population of Żebbuġ, as well as a donation by the parish church. The arch was designed by the mason Giuseppe Xerri, who also supervised its construction. It was inaugurated on 12 May 1798 by the new Grand Master, Ferdinand von Hompesch zu Bolheim. The gate was one of the last examples of Hospitaller-era architecture in Malta, since a month after its inauguration the French invaded the islands and brought the Order's rule to an end.

Between 1905 and 1929, the Malta tramway used to pass near the arch. In the 1950s, Freedom Avenue (Maltese: Vjal il-Ħelsien) was opened to give better access to the Żebbuġ centre, and this reduced the amount of traffic passing through the arch. Later on, vehicles were not allowed to pass through the arch in order to preserve it. The arch was restored by the Żebbuġ Local Council in 1995. It was restored again in 2016.

The De Rohan Arch was included on the Antiquities List of 1925, and it is now scheduled as a Grade 1 national monument.

== Architecture ==
De Rohan Arch is built in the neoclassical style. The archway is flanked by rusticated Doric pilasters set on a plain pedestal. The arch is topped by a triangular pediment having moulded edges.

A Gothic designed niche, containing a portrait of the Ecce homo, is located within the arch. The niche, painted in red and white, is listed on National Inventory of the Cultural Property of the Maltese Islands.

== See also ==
- Hompesch Gate
- List of post-Roman triumphal arches
