= Żabbar Batteries and Redoubt =

- Batteriji u Ridott ta' Ħaż-Żabbar
- Part of the French blockade batteries
- Żabbar, Malta
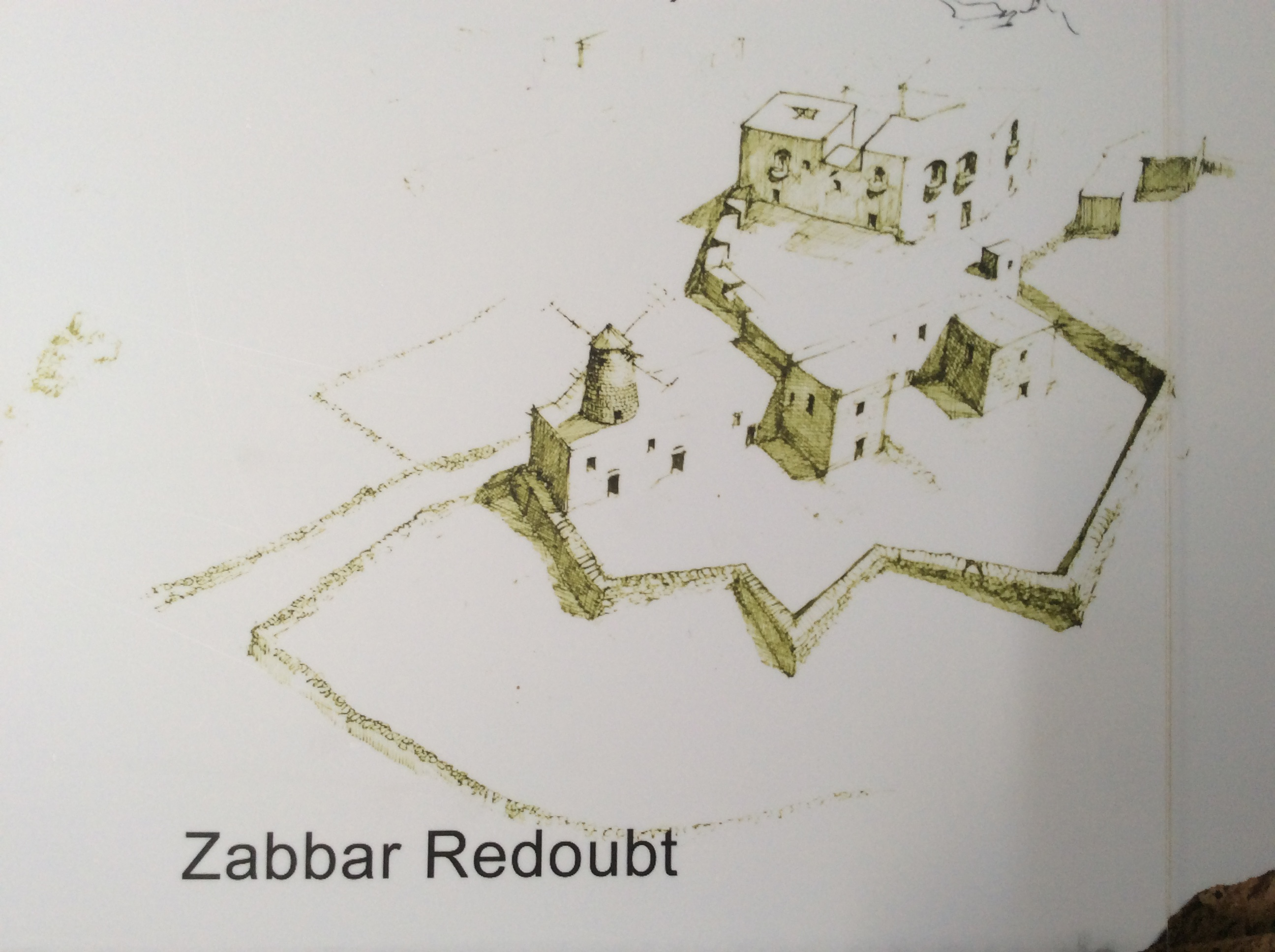
- Reconstruction of the Żabbar Redoubt and one of the batteries by Stephen C. Spiteri at the Fortifications Interpretation Centre

Site information
- Type: Artillery batteries and redoubt

Location
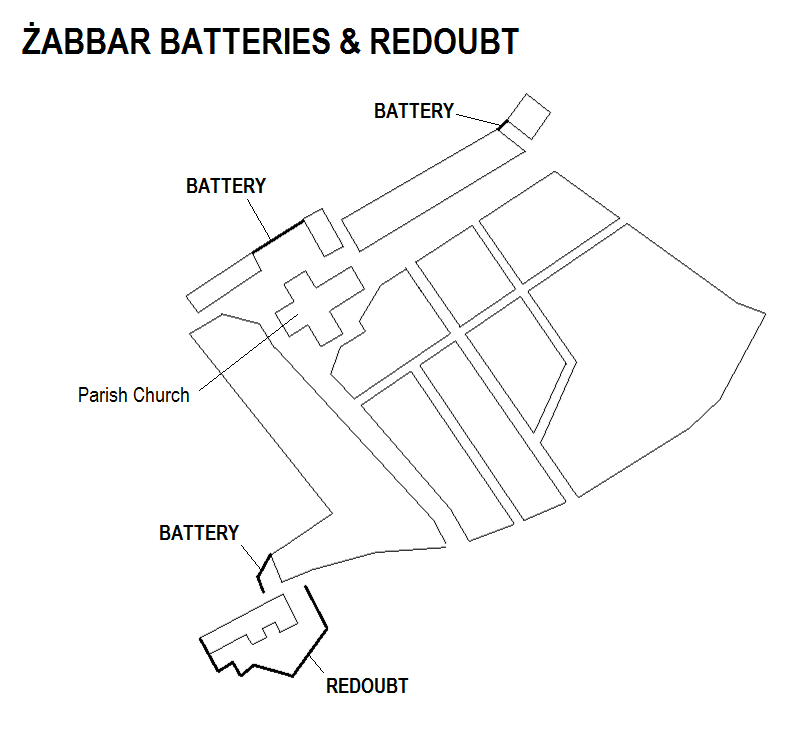
- Map of the batteries and redoubt in Żabbar
- Coordinates: 35°52′30.3″N 14°32′02.1″E

Site history
- Built: c. 1798
- Built by: Maltese insurgents
- In use: c. 1798–1800
- Materials: Limestone
- Fate: Demolished
- Battles/wars: Siege of Malta (1798–1800)

Garrison information
- Past commanders: Clemente Ellul

The Żabbar Batteries and Redoubt (Maltese: Batteriji u Ridott ta' Ħaż-Żabbar) were a series of artillery batteries and a redoubt in Żabbar, Malta, built by Maltese insurgents during the French blockade of 1798–1800. They formed part of a chain of batteries, redoubts and entrenchments encircling the French positions in Marsamxett and the Grand Harbour.

== Description and history ==
Żabbar was the closest Maltese city to the French-occupied harbour fortifications, and it was repeatedly bombarded from the Cottonera Lines. The inhabitants barricaded the streets and built batteries and a redoubt to protect the city from an attack. The fortifications of Żabbar consisted of:

- a battery near the parish church, which was armed with two cannons
- a battery blocking the road to the Notre Dame Gate
- a battery and a redoubt blocking the southwest flank of the village. The redoubt was of the pietra a secco type, similar to one found at Saint Agatha's Tower.

The batteries were fitted with underground shelters or were covered over to protect the gun crews. They fell under the command of Clemente Ellul, and his deputies Giuseppe Cachia and Giuseppe Ellul.

Like the other French blockade fortifications, the Żabbar Batteries and Redoubt were probably demolished soon after the end of the blockade. No traces of the actual batteries or redoubt can be seen today, but some buildings which had been incorporated into the redoubt, including a windmill, still exist.
