= Santa Marija Chapel =

Church of the Assumption
- The church of the Assumption of Mary
- Il-Knisja ta' Santa Marija
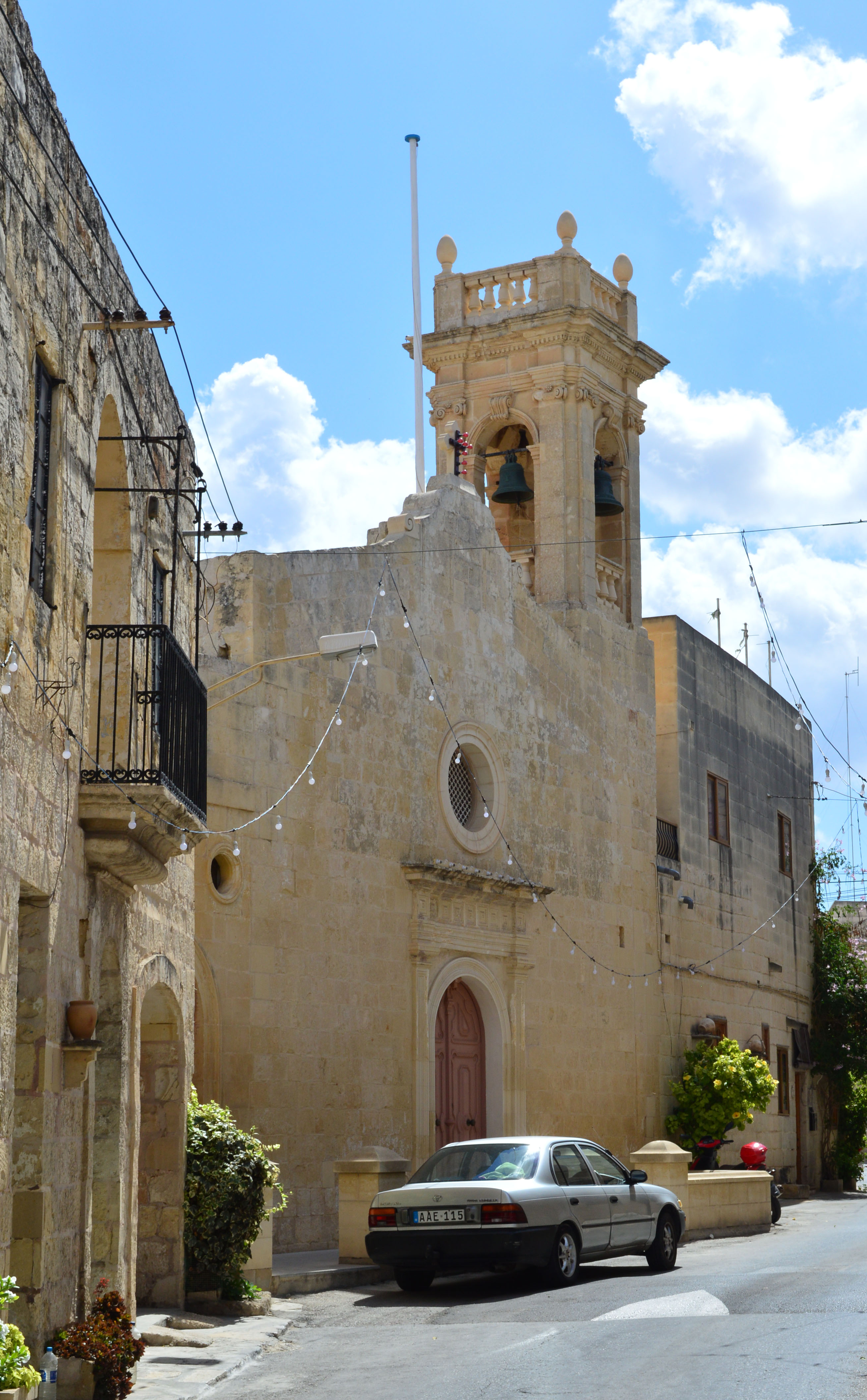

- Location within Malta
- 35°52′25.8″N 14°32′19.9″E
- Location: Żabbar
- Country: Malta
- Denomination: Roman Catholic

History
- Status: Active
- Founded: 1615; 411 years ago
- Founder: Gaspare Testaferrata

Architecture
- Functional status: Church
- Years built: 1585–1615

Administration
- Archdiocese: Malta

Clergy
- Archbishop: Charles Scicluna

The Santa Marija Chapel is one of the Roman Catholic churches in Żabbar, Malta. This church is dedicated to the Assumption of Mary and is known by the title 'tal-indirizz' (guide towards eternal salvation) and is the only one having this title in Malta. This chapel is found in one of the oldest quarters of the town of Żabbar.

== History ==
In 1585, Gaspare Testaferrata was doing his best to rebuild an old church which existed till then. By 1615, this work was finished and a new altarpiece representing Our Lady and St Leonard was already provided. Its feast was held on 8 September. Throughout the 17th century people from different parts of Malta used to visit this Marian shrine. Its altarpiece was adorned with various precious objects. During the French occupation of 1799, it served as a parish church because of the damage inflicted by cannonballs fired by French soldiers from the Cottonera Lines on to the Sanctuary of Our Lady of Grace. Popular devotion towards this church continued to prevail throughout the 18th century.

== Present day ==
The present altarpiece shows the Assumption of Mary (transported into Heaven with her body and soul united). A good statue of Our Lady of Sorrows is also in this chapel. Nowadays not only Masses are celebrated here but catechetical instruction is also given. Recently marriages also started being celebrated in this chapel.

The chapel is listed on the National Inventory of the Cultural Property of the Maltese Islands.

== See also ==
- Culture of Malta
- History of Malta
- List of Churches in Malta
- Religion in Malta
