= Fort Leonardo =

Polygonal fort in Żabbar, Malta

- Il-Fortizza San Leonardu
- Żabbar, Malta
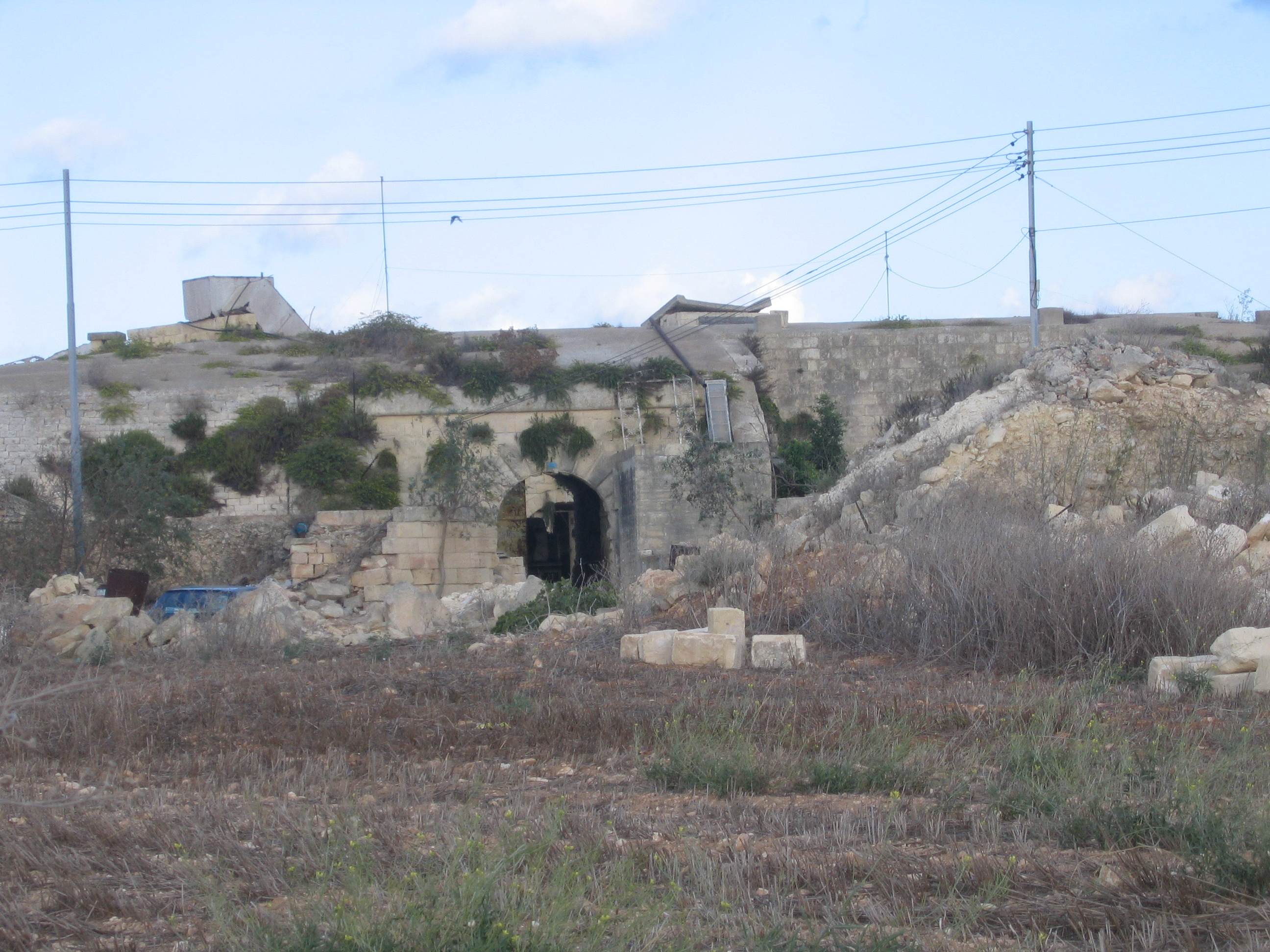
- Main gate of Fort Leonardo

Site information
- Type: Polygonal fort
- Open to the public: No
- Condition: Intact but neglected

Location
- Coordinates: 35°52′40.1″N 14°33′34.9″E
- Area: 70,000 m^{2} (750,000 sq ft)

Site history
- Built: 1872–1878
- Built by: British Empire
- In use: 1878–1970s
- Materials: Limestone
- Battles/wars: World War II

Fort Leonardo (Maltese: Il-Fortizza San Leonardu), also known as Fort San Leonardo or Fort San Anard, is a polygonal fort in Żabbar, Malta. It was built between 1872 and 1878 by the British between the villages of San Leonardo and Żonqor above the shore east of the Grand Harbour.

== History ==
Fort Leonardo was built between 1872 and 1878 by the British, as part of a programme of improvements to Malta's fortifications recommended in Colonel Jervois' Report of 1866. The fort was to be called Fort Tombrell but the name was changed to Fort Leonardo when construction began.

Its layout is complicated, with a smaller inner fort forming one corner within the larger part of the fort that contains the gun emplacements. The fort was initially armed with 11 inch rifled muzzle-loading guns, which were later superseded by 9.2 inch breech loading guns.

In 1882, Żonqor Battery was built about a kilometre away from Fort Leonardo. The battery was manned by the gun crew and garrison stationed in Fort Leonardo.

Fort Leonardo was used for coastal defence in World War II. On 17 May 1942, the fort helped repel an attacks by at least four Italian E-boats.

The fort remained in use by the British military until the 1970s.

=== Present day ===
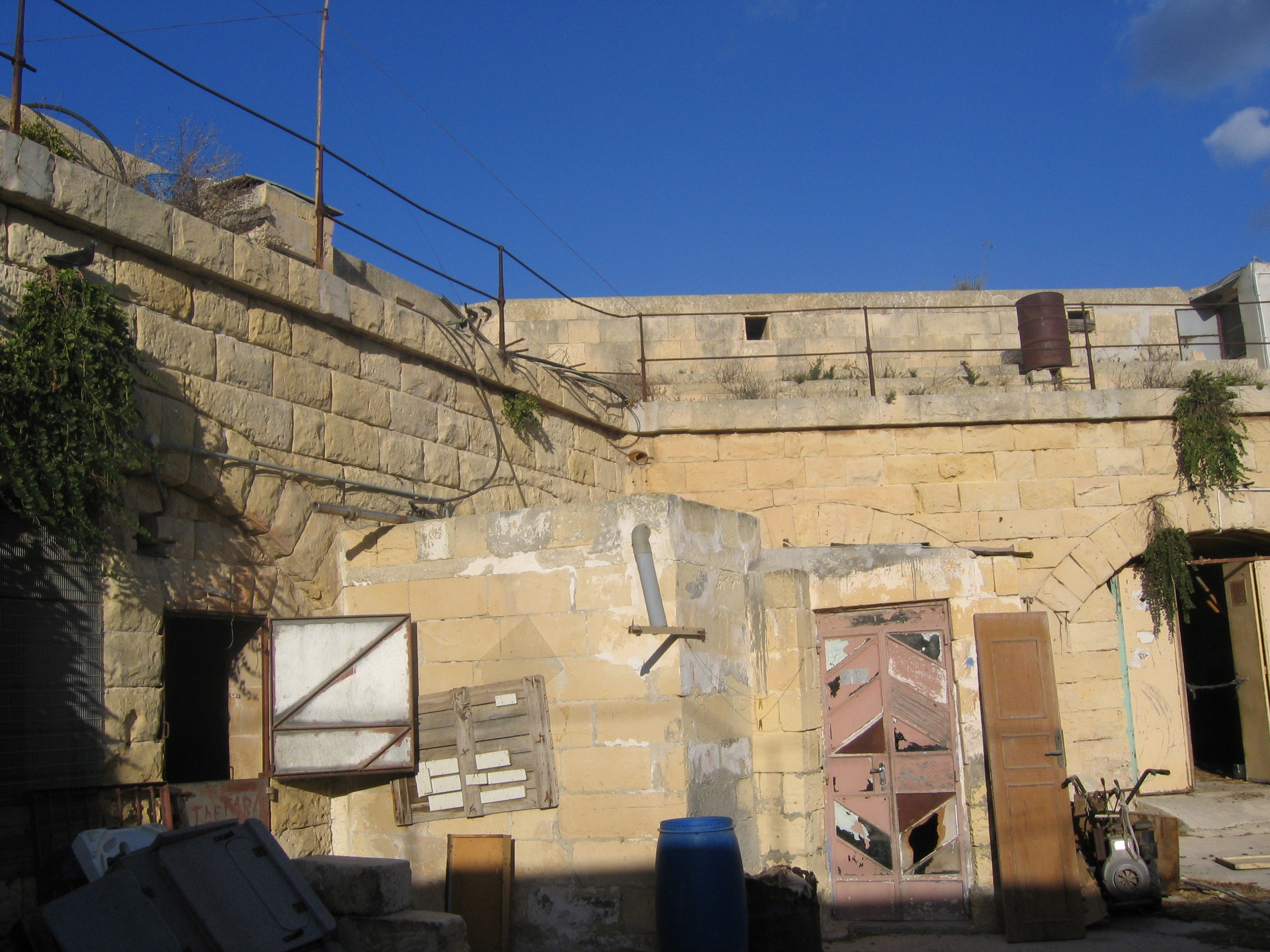
Interior of Fort Leonardo

Fort Leonardo was rented to a cattle farmer in 1973 for an annual sum of €93, and was used as a farm until the early 2010s.

The fort itself is still in reasonable repair, though a house has been built inside the ditch and the ditch in-filled to create an access. The seaward ditches are all in good repair. A modern construction, possibly a reservoir, alongside the shoreward side of the fort detracts from its original appearance, and the approach to the main gate has been mined for rubble and is substantially damaged.

In 2011, a 60-metre high communications tower of the telecommunications company GO was approved to be built on the glacis of the fort.

In 2014, it was proposed that the fort would be turned into a boutique hotel. Din l-Art Ħelwa said that the fort should be restored, but its military context should not be lost as was done with Cambridge Battery on Tigné Point.

In 2015, the government made a proposal to include Fort Leonardo in the campus of the American University of Malta, which was to open in 2016, on the condition that the fort is rehabilitated and opened to the public. This proposal was not implemented, as the campus was split up between Dock No. 1 in Cospicua and Żonqor Point in Marsaskala.

In May 2015, opposition MP Jason Azzopardi also proposed that the site should be opened for the public.
