= Il-Foss =

Football stadium in Malta

Zabbar Ground
- Il-Foss - Zabbar
- Interactive map of Zabbar Ground
- Location: Żabbar, Malta
- Coordinates: 35°52′45″N 14°31′47.4″E
- Owner: Zabbar St. Patrick
- Operator: Zabbar St. Patrick
- Capacity: 1,000
- Surface: Artificial turf

Construction
- Built: 1972
- Opened: November 1972
- Renovated: 2008

The Zabbar Ground better known by its nickname Il-Foss is a football ground in Ħaż-Żabbar, Malta. It serves as the home ground of Maltese football club Zabbar St. Patrick. The ground was built in 1972 using construction debris on the old ditch (hence the name 'il-foss') in front of the Notre Dame Bastion, situated on the outer perimeter of the famous Cottonera Lines of fortifications.

Initially, the ground did not feature a full-size pitch and had a concrete stand behind the south end goalpost that could accommodate around 1,000 spectators. This stand was later demolished to extend the pitch to 100 metres.

The ground is utilized for training sessions by the club's youth teams up to the first team. It has a small capacity of standing capacity of 1,000 spectators. However, there are plans to build a grand stand that will provide a seated capacity of 1,600 spectators. During the 2007–2008 season, the ground underwent extensive renovations, including an upgrade from sand pitch to artificial turf.
