= Società Filarmonica Maria Mater Gratiæ =

Lat band in żabbar

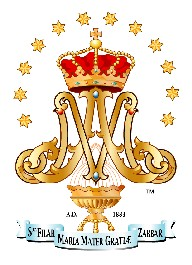
The Emblem of Società Filarmonica Maria Mater Gratiæ

The Società Filarmonica Maria Mater Gratiæ is the lat band club in Żabbar, Malta.

Founded in 1883 by Francesco Saverio Briffa and the Zabbar musician, Mro Giuseppe Micallef. It is the first band club in Zabbar. The club's main aim is cultivating a love of music. Throughout the years, the club has organized numerous music concerts held by the band itself. One of the club's main activities is the participation in its patron's feast, that of Our Lady Of Graces. The club's premises has always been in Sanctuary street, a stone's throw away from the parish church dedicated to the same patron. The club also has a certain nickname which identify it across the Maltese Islands, "Tal-Baqra". The nickname "Tal-Baqra" was originally formed after the first bandmaster of the club, who was known as "Il-Baqrambun". The nickname was formed to identify the club from the two local clubs that honor Żabbar. The other nickname, "Tal-Grazzja" was formed for their loved patron, Our Lady of Graces. Bandclubs in Malta usually compare themselves to a certain animal as their mascot. In this case, this society compares itself to the lion, as a king, showing strength and pride. The club's colour is blue, usually blended with white or yellow.

== History ==
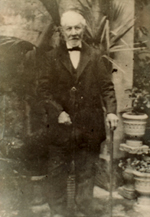
Francesco Saverio Briffa - Founder

=== How It Started ===
The band known as tal-Baqra was the last band in Żabbar formed by Francesco Saverio Briffa together with the band's first conductor, Maestro Giuseppe Micallef, also known as "Il-Baqrambun". Maestro Giuseppe Micallef had huge talent in this category, boasting his experience with the Royal Malta Fencible Artillery and as conductor on a number of HMS Ships. One of his earliest known works in relation with Żabbar and its Patron Saint is a hymn for Our Lady of Graces, finished in 1879.

On 26 May 1887 a concert was organized by this first Żabbar band under the name of Banda Santa Maria for the occasion of the 50th anniversary of the coronation of Queen Victoria. This is the first documented appearance of any Żabbar band and shows the beginning of the musical history of this village. Soon after this mentioned concert a disagreement between the members resulted in another new band club. The reason for this disagreement was that some members wanted Mro. Carmelo Abela Scolaro to be their bandmaster, while others still wanted Maestro Giuseppe Micallef. The founder, Francesco Saverio Briffa together with Mro. Micallef kept with the original band club, while Societa' Filarmoniva San Michele was then founded as an offspring. Following this dispute and split the original band is then found to be named Societa' Filarmonica Maria delle Grazie or Società Filarmonica Maria Mater Gratiæ, a name which connects this band club exclusively with Żabbar's own Patron Saint. The club was also nicknamed "Tal-Baqra" derived from the club's bandmaster nickname - Il-Baqrambun.

=== Early Stages ===
In 1898, the club's president was changed to Mr. Giuseppe Pace Spadaro, whilst in 1903, Maestro Pacifico Scicluna was established as the new bandmaster, after the band had been conducted for several years by the founding bandmaster Mro. Gius. Micallef, by Mro Carmelo Abela Scolaro, Mro. Bernardo Costa and Spiridione Zammit. The new bandmaster Scicluna earned a huge reputation with the club's members, and his name was well kept and adored, as he managed to work with the club for twenty nine years, yet not consecutive.

In 1908, Maestro Lorenzo Gonzi had the honor to be the club's bandmaster. In that same year, he composed a hymn for Our Lady of Graces, which was accompanied by a choir of children.

In 1916, Mr. Giuseppe Calleja was elected as president of the club. During this time (between 1912 and 1917), Żabbar was once again with one band club as financial troubles crippled the St. Michael's Band Club forcing it to close its door for over 5 years. During this period several objects belonging to St. Michael's club were kept safely at the Maria Mater Gratiae band club so that they will not be lost or sold. President Giuseppe Calleja kept the same role throughout the turbulent years of the First World War and even through the early 1920s, then followed by President Giovanni Corrado and Prof. Giuseppe Ellul. It was in that period of time, when the band invested in a new official uniform after the uniform used since 1904 had to be changed.

In 1924, a statue dedicated to a representation of the Island of Malta, was sculpted by Guzeppi Caruana. In the annual feast of 1927, the statue was processionally carried through the streets of Żabbar during the Friday March celebration. This statue was placed on a column which was erected in the square of Sanctuary Street. In that same year, Maestro Lorenzo Gonzi composed another hymn, this time dedicated to the new statue. The hymn was named "Malta u Wliedha" (Malta and its sons). This tradition is still celebrated today.

In 1927, the club moved under the Presidency of Dr. Giuseppe Agius Muscat. His name became pretty popular with the locals as he was a man which guided the club through the Second World War, and also helped to reduce disagreements between the two clubs due to rivalry.

The 1930s served as a very important decade to the society's history. On 4 February 1934, the Archbishop Dom Mauro Caruana, consecrated the Holy Heart of Jesus to the Society. For this occasion, a memorable feast took place.

In 1935, the society invested in a new instrument set from Boosey and Hawkes. This was blessed by Cardinal Enrico Lepicier who was visiting Malta for the Regional Council.

In this period of time, the club became popular for its theatrical activities, held at the club's premises itself. The club even had its own theatrical company. The dedication for theatrical work was so passionate that at a stage in the late 1930s, the club considered investing in a new theater inside the club. Yet, this idea was put off as war was nearby. In fact, when the Second World War broke out, virtually all band activities were reduced or stopped altogether throughout Malta. During this period the club's premises was converted into an ARP center while the club members still met at No.85 Sanctuary Street Żabbar. Once Malta went on the offensive and the war situation improved greatly in 1943, the Maria Mater Gratiae restarted immediately with its regular band activities, during this year taking part in all activities organised for the titular feast of Żabbar (including also the traditional morning march, which was organised by this band on feast day, rather on the eve of the feast, as had been done before), the secondary feast of Our Lady of the Sacred Heart of Jesus and other religious feasts.

=== After WWII ===
After World War II, the pharmacist Sir Arturo Felice was elected as the club's president. The Society immediately embarked on the building of its own outdoor theater in the club's garden. It was most ambitious project of the club to date, yet many club members helped financially and with voluntary work with great enthusiasm. The project lasted three years and was given the name of "Blue Arena Theatre". The theater's capacity was of 450 seated spectators, and its name became known around the island for its frequent theatrical works.

In March 1943, Mons. Ġużeppi Zarb was given the role of Parish Priest and he immediately started working hard to achieve one of the most devotional wishes by the Żabbar people - the coronation of the titular painting of Our Lady of Graces, a work of art by Alessio Erardi, finished in 1715. The dream of every Żabbar parishioner became reality when Archbishop Gonzi crowned and blessed the painting on the church's parvis in front of the largest crowd ever seen in Żabbar. In this year big feasts were celebrated especially by the Maria Mater Gratiae band club. The club commissioned a special hymn for this occasion. Maestro Joseph Abela Scolaro was in charge of the music, whilst the monk Mattew Sultana, wrote the lyrics. The hymn was first played publicly on 26 August 1951, in Sanctuary Street's square.

In 1983 the club celebrated its 100th year. A program of activities was planned. It was in this period of time, where youth participation increased. The youth inclusion resulted in a boost in decorations for the feast, and other occasions, like Christmas. In fact, for three consecutive years, the club won the national competition for the best decorated street for Christmas, and also the national competition for best decorated facade for Christmas.

The club's society continued to strengthen as Ing. Vincent Magri was elected president in 1988. Three subcommittees were formed, the "Fergħa Nisa", the "Kummissjoni Żgħażagħ tal-Grazzja" and the "Kummissjoni Nar u Armar".

In 1992, the two band clubs signed an agreement to respect a set of regulations so that the feast could be celebrated with more collaboration and respect between Żabbar's two band clubs' supporters. The club also bought a new hall, known as "Maria Mater Gratiae Hall" which is used as a commercial premises for parties and reception rentals. In addition, a store was also bought so that youths can work on any projects there, whilst also serving as a store for any decorations used.

On 8 August 2003, the band club undertook a promise to buy the building numbered 56 and 58 in Sanctuary street. The building is also known as "l-Għassa l-Antika". The club successfully purchased the building on 9 January 2004.

In the musical area, the club made important reforms for music learning. These reforms were introduced by the current bandmaster, Maestro Ray Sciberras FLCM. The capabilities of the bandmaster and his musicians, however, reached their peak in 2001, when the society held a special and memorable feast on the occasion of the Fiftieth Anniversary of the crowning of Our Lady of Graces' painting.

For this occasion, Maestro Sciberras wrote a new hymn named "Cantata Maria Mater Gratiæ" on verses of George Peresso and was played for the first time by the band on Sunday 19 August 2001 in the Sanctuary of Our Lady of Graces, accompanied by the choir, two sopranos, an "għannej", a narrator and a tenor. The great applause and the spontaneous standing ovation the band earned when finishing the hymn, are still pictured clearly in every person's mind that was present that day.

For this feast, the Kummissjoni Żgħażagħ also worked to make new decorations. One of the main attractions for 2001's feast was the manufacture of the big umbrella, which probably is the biggest umbrella in the Europe. The umbrella is painted to show motifs associated with Żabbar's and the Society's history.

== Presidents ==
Presidents - Società Filarmonica Maria Mater Gratiæ.

Name	Year(s)
Francesco S. Briffa	1900–1916
Giuseppe Calleja	1916–1921
Giovanni Corrado	1921–1924
Giuseppe Ellul	1924–1927
Aronne Gulia	1927
Giuseppe Agius Muscat	1927–1943
Salvatore Astarita	1943
Giuseppe Agius Muscat	1943–1946
Arturo R. Felice	1946–1953
Espedito Catania	1953–1957
Victor Cauchi	1957–1959
Salvatore Sciberras	1959–1960
Espedito Catania	1961–1962
John Debono	1962
Francis J. Scicluna	1962–1974
Espedito Catania	1974–1976
Alfred R. Scicluna	1976–1979
Salvatore Sciberras	1979–1982
Joseph C. Attard	1982–1988
Vincent Magri	1988–2001
Alfred Spiteri	2001–2011
Joseph A. Saliba	2011 - 2019
Mario Aquilina	2019 -

== Band Masters ==
Bandmasters - Società Filarmonica Maria Mater Gratiæ.

Name	Year(s)
Giuseppe Micallef	1883–1889
Carmelo Abela Scolaro	1889–1891
Giuseppe Micallef	1891–1893
Bernardo Costa	1893–1895
Giuseppe Micallef	1895–1899
Spiridione Zammit	1899–1903
Pacifico Scicluna	1903–1906
Salvatore Galea Abela	1906–1908
Lorenzo Gonzi	1908–1913
Pacifico Scicluna	1913–1918
Lorenzo Gonzi	1918–1928
Pacifico Scicluna	1928–1943
Emmanuel Camilleri	1943–1944
Pacifico Scicluna	1944–1951
Joseph Abela Scolaro	1951–1961
William J. Worley	1961–1963
Carmelo Caruana	1963–1974
Orazio Cachia	1974–1981
Angelo Pace	1981–1985
Ugo Buhagiar	1985–1990
Raymond Sciberras	1990–2012
Kevin Mizzi	2012–
