= People's Sunday =

First Sunday of Lent at Żabbar, Malta

- Official name: Ħadd in-Nies
- Observed by: Żabbar, Malta
- Date: First Sunday of Lent
- Frequency: Annual

People's Sunday (Maltese: Ħadd in-Nies) is a celebration held on Quadragesima Sunday (the first Sunday of Lent) at Żabbar, Malta. It centres on living recollections of centuries-old devotions to Our Lady of Graces (Il-Madonna tal-Grazzja). The day’s name refers to the large number of pilgrims from diverse backgrounds who would visit Żabbar to render thanks and pray at the feet of the Blessed Virgin Mary.

On 6 March 1927, Archbishop of Malta Dom Mauro Caruana, OSB participated in the renewed religious celebration of People's Sunday; today, Archbishop Charles Scicluna visits the Żabbar Shrine of Our Lady of Graces, to meet the clergy and participate in the pilgrimage with the statue of Our Lady of Graces by Mariano Girada (c. 1797).

The oldest evidence of the Maltese devotion to Our Lady of Graces came to light in 1954 with the discovery of a late 15th-century fresco in the early Melitan-style Chapel of Saint Domenica in Żabbar. The earliest surviving 16th-century reports by bishops give us an insight into the devotion to Our Lady, while a fragmentary report from 1570 by Msgr Antonio Bartolo, Vicar General sede vacante, just five years after the Great Siege of Malta in 1565, further attests to the popularity of this devotion. The four-page inventory of furnishings for the Virgin’s chapel lists richly woven liturgical vestments, silver necklaces, precious ornaments, together with humble altar cloths. This clearly indicates that both rich and poor flocked to the sacred site and donated such objects.

This is fully supported by the report of Apostolic Delegate Pietro Dusina from 1575, where his description of churches and chapels in Malta and Gozo incidentally shows the Żabbar chapel was the only one dedicated to Our Lady of Graces. This was a factor that surely helped to attract more people. A hundred years later before another chapel was dedicated to Our Lady of Graces at Ħal Missilment in Naxxar, Malta.

Msgr Dusina was very impressed by the great attachment people had to the Żabbar chapel, writing of the many pilgrims from various towns and villages visit to implore favours or give thanks for benefits received, leaving behind ex-votos of all sorts which eventually covered the chapel walls. Most of these pilgrims went every Wednesday, with two to three Masses said on these days to meet the pilgrim demand. This was uncommon elsewhere in the period, aa only one Mass was celebrated annually on the patron saint's feast day. To cater to these pilgrims, Msgr Dusina appointed Fr Antonio De Nicolaci as rector of the Żabbar chapel "to foster and strengthen this holy devotion among the people."

The practice of going on a pilgrimage as a sign of penance and a closer approach to God goes back to the early centuries of the Christian Church. In Rome, the faithful gathered at a station church and followed the Pope or ecclesial dignitary to another station chapel. They recited prayers and chanted penitential psalms all along the route.

By 1585, the Żabbar chapel proved too small to accommodate the ever-increasing number of pilgrims. Grand Master Hugues Loubenx de Verdalle helped extend the church and donated a new titular painting. At the same time, Pope Sixtus V granted a hundred days indulgence to all visitors. In 1636, just 20 years after the chapel had been made a parish before splitting with Żejtun, Bishop Michaele Belageur described the large quantity of ex-votos, and stated that of all the churches on the islands, the shrine attracts the greatest devotion: “devotissima est.”

Similar comments were made by later bishops when visiting Żabbar. A typical remark is that made by Bishop Alpheran de Bussan (1728-1757), who in his 1737 visit stated: "From olden times a large number of people converged to this church of Our Lady of Graces to offer thanks for the miraculous favours received." The people offered gifts to fulfil vows, leaving behind small paintings, chains, weapons and all kinds of trophies of war as a sign of gratitude to God and Holy Mary. One every Wednesday and especially on Ash Wednesday, the number of these pilgrims from cities, towns and villages is even greater." The inventories of the church, especially those of 1679 and 1699, list many sich donations.

Throughout the years, this tradition became similar to the L-Imnarja held every 29 June in Buskett, with the difference that there was a spiritual and devotional aspect to it, which gave importance to visiting the shrine first.

In the 20th Century, People's Sunday became a parade with floats in honour of Our Lady of Grace, which paid homage to her intercession during times of need. People also dress in costumes, making it a more devotional occasion.

The titular image of Our Lady of Grace by Mariano Girada (c. 1797) was formerly brought near the high altar of the shrine until 2016, when People's Sunday became a Diocesan Penitential Pilgrimage in Malta and the statue was now being brought in procession and attracting hundreds of people. This format of pilgrimage also took place in 1951 for the canonical coronation of Our Lady of Grace's 1715 titular painting by Alessio Erardi, and in 2001 for the coronation’s golden jubilee.

== Social gathering ==
In the meantime, Carnival celebrations were becoming more organised, adding a new aspect to these Lenten pilgrimages. Those who might have misbehaved or somehow gone beyond their Christian duties during Carnival felt they could repent by participating in these pilgrimages.

Ash Wednesday, being a normal working day observed with fasting and abstinence, proved inconvenient for many, and many preferred to satisfy their obligations on the first Sunday of Lent. Within the following century, the shift seemed to have been well established. George Percy Badger, who was in Malta in 1838, stated that it was still practised on Ash Wednesday. However, an updated edition from 1858 states the pilgrimage took place on the first Sunday of Lent.
