= Żabbar =

Żabbar Ħaż-Żabbar Città Hompesch, Casal Zabbar
- City and Local council
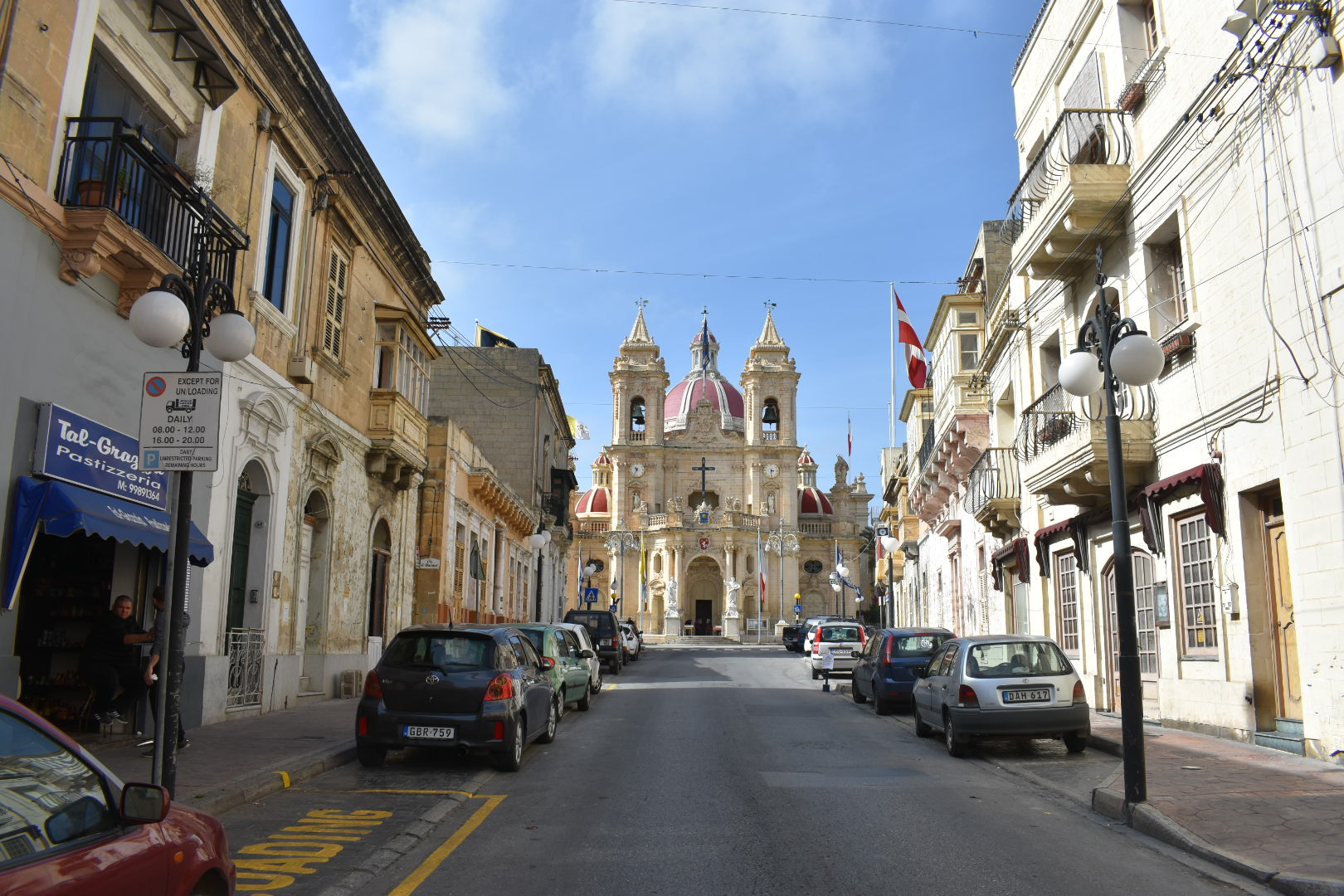
- Sanctuary Street, leading to the Żabbar Parish Church

- Flag Coat of arms

- Coordinates: 35°52′38″N 14°32′17″E
- Country: Malta
- Region: Port Region
- District: Southern Harbour District
- Borders: Birgu, Cospicua, Fgura, Kalkara, Marsaskala, Xgħajra, Żejtun

Government
  - Mayor: Jorge Grech (PL)

Area
  - Total: 5.3 km^{2} (2.0 sq mi)

Population (Jul. 2024)
  - Total: 17,779
  - Density: 3,400/km^{2} (8,700/sq mi)
- Demonym(s): Żabbari (m), Żabbarija (f), Żabbarin (pl)
- Time zone: UTC+1 (CET)
  - Summer (DST): UTC+2 (CEST)
- Postal code: ZBR
- Dialing code: 356
- ISO 3166 code: MT-64
- Patron saint: Our Lady of Graces
- Day of festa: Sunday after 8 September
- Website: www.zabbar.gov.mt

Żabbar (Maltese: Ħaż-Żabbar [ħɐzːɐˈbːɐːr]), also known as Città Hompesch, is a city in the Port Region of Malta. It is the seventh largest city in the country, with an estimated population of 15,648 as of January 2021. Originally a part of Żejtun, Żabbar was granted the title of Città Hompesch by the last of the Grand Masters of the Order of St. John to reign in Malta, Ferdinand von Hompesch zu Bolheim.

== Etymology ==
The name of the city probably derives from the Maltese word tiżbor, the process of pruning trees. Indeed, a number of families who specialised in pruning, żbir, are known to have lived in the vicinity of this village during the Middle Ages. Other possibilities of this derivation exist. Żabbar was also the surname of an important family that was known to have lived in the area. Ħaż-Żabbar could also have been a corruption of Ħas-Sabbar (the consoler village) or derived from sabbara (consoler in Maltese), which would be connected to turning to Our Lady of Graces for consolation and the old chapel of Our Lady of Graces which preceded the current sanctuary.

The word sabbar could also be the plural of Zabbara which is the Agave plant in Sicilian. This would be derived from the Arabic صَبّار (ṣabbār) meaning cacti. In fact, in some Arab countries ṣabbār means prickly pear. The "ṣ" in this case, is strong and is pronounced as "z". Judging by the names of other Maltese villages, like nearby Żejtun (meaning "olive" in Arabic) it seems quite probable that such names may have agricultural connotations.

== Demography ==
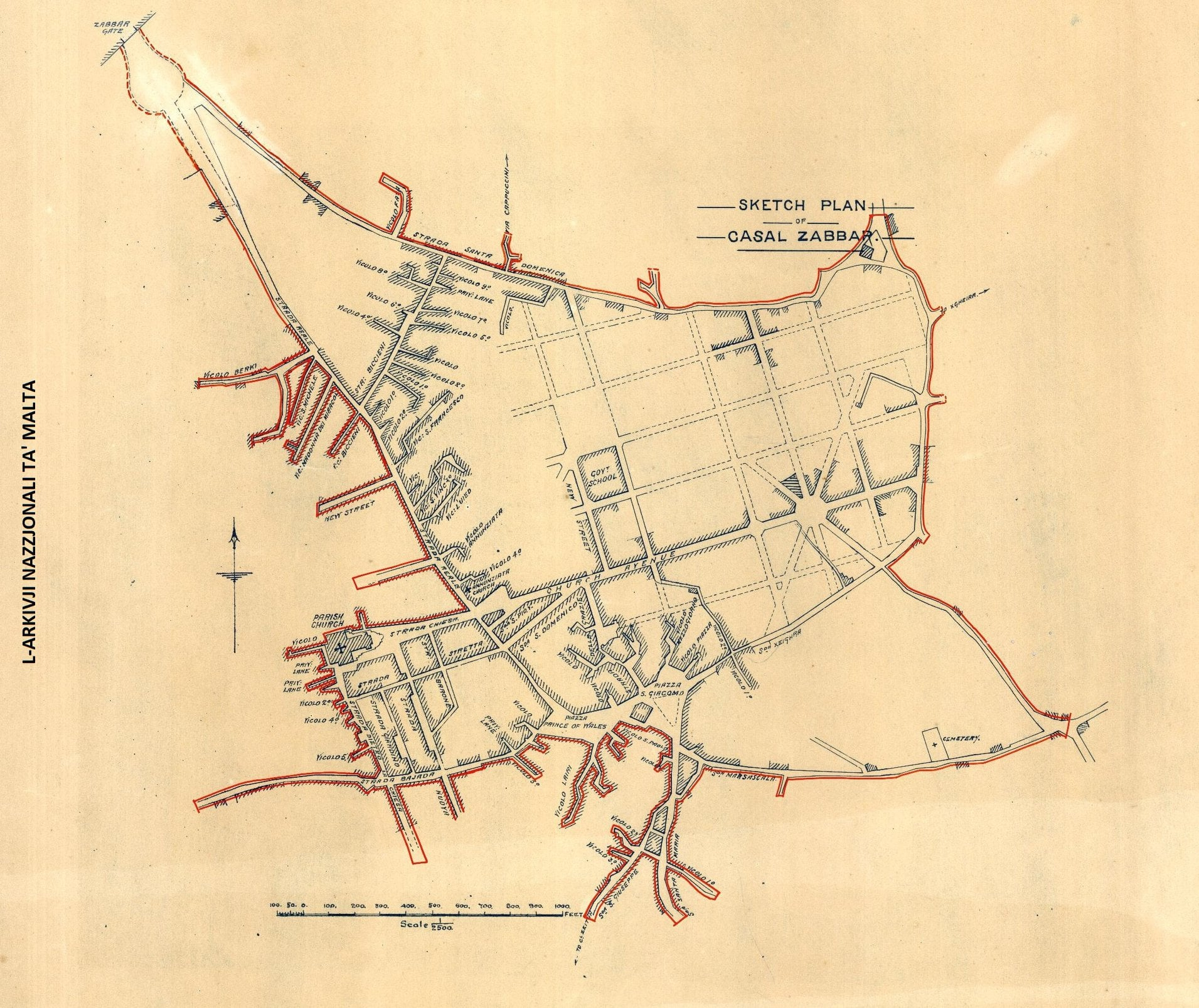
Urban planning map of Żabbar, 1901

The population of Żabbar was 17,779 in July 2024. This included 9322 males and 8457 females; 15889 Maltese nationals and 1890 foreign nationals.

Ħaż-Żabbar is bound to the north by Kalkara and Xgħajra, to the west by Fgura and the Cottonera Lines (enclosing the localities of Vittoriosa and Cospicua), to the east by Marsaskala and to the south by Żejtun. Ħaż-Żabbar has the largest population of all localities within the area. The western part of this town, composed essentially of Il-Biċċieni and Tal-Bajjada (also known as Il-Misraħ) areas, is characterized by high dwelling density and comprises a series of winding streets that define the village core.

The eastern half is mostly suburban with more recent developments mostly in the form of terraced housing and modern maisonettes and apartments. Ħaż-Żabbar has two other distinct residential neighbourhoods namely Bulebel iż-Żgħir, which is characterized by Government housing estates/ multi-storey apartment blocks and rows of terraced house units that were constructed out of various Home Ownership Schemes (HOS), and the area referred to as St. Peter's.

== History ==
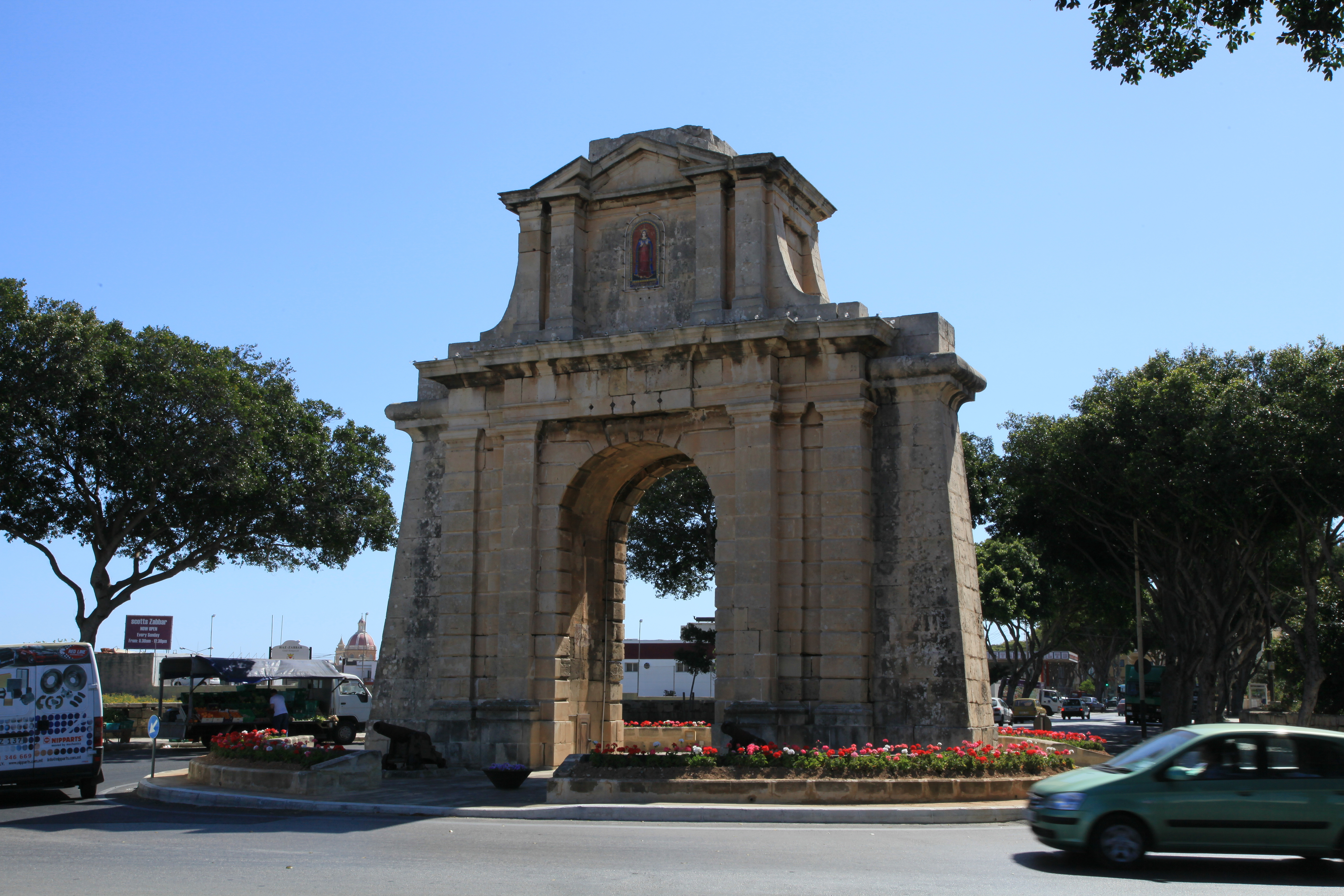
Hompesch Gate

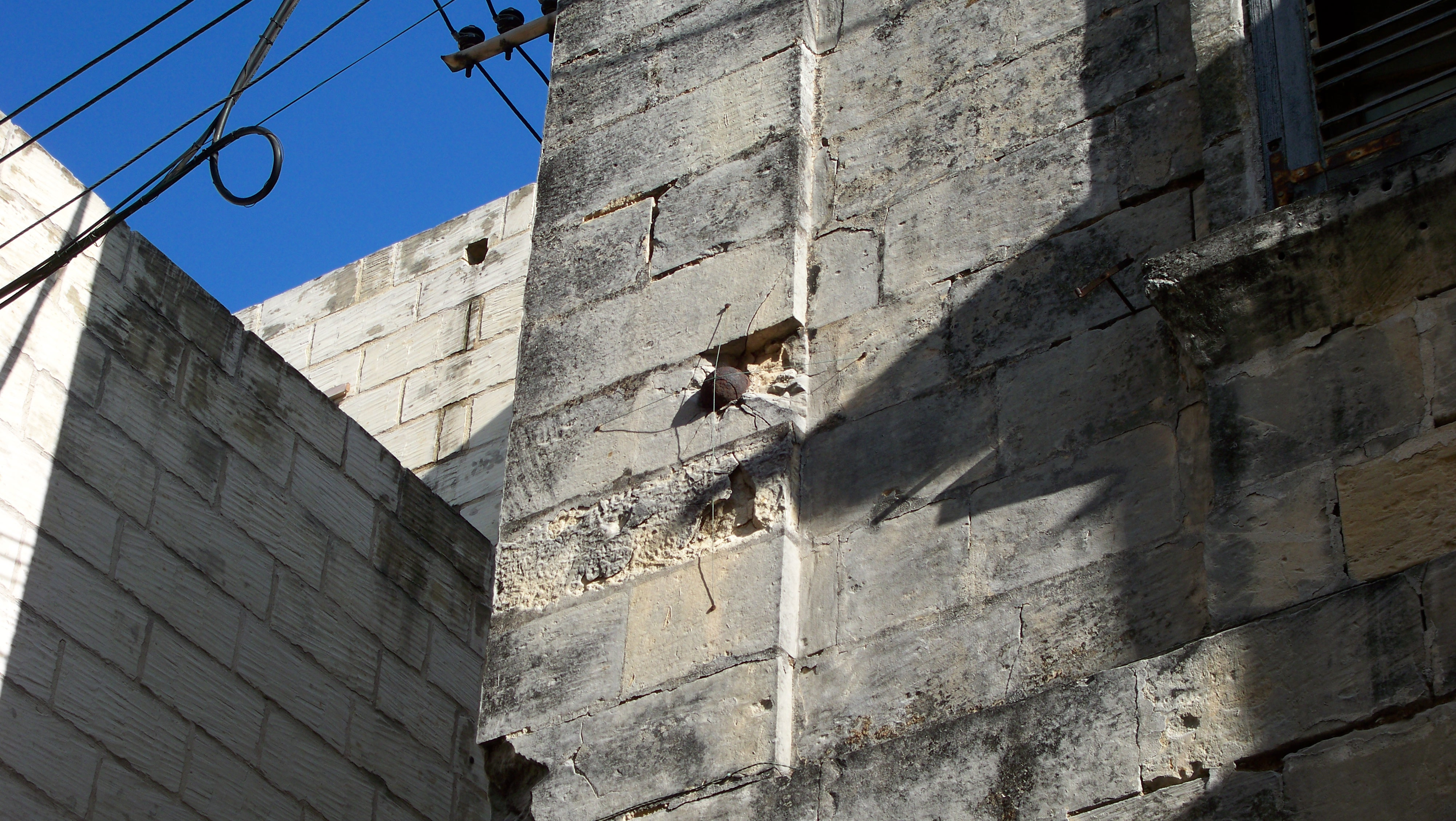
Cannonball still lodged in the façade of a house in Żabbar.

The town was used as an encampment by the Ottoman armies at the outset of the Great Siege of 1565. Ħaż-Żabbar was granted city status by the last Grand Master on Malta, Ferdinand von Hompesch, in whose name the population built a triumphal arch on the main approach road from Paola through Fgura.

During the Maltese uprising against the French between 1798 and 1800 the city was used as a base by the Maltese insurgents. A memorable battle on 5 October 1798 took place in front of the Ħaż-Żabbar Sanctuary. To this day, French-era cannonballs can be seen lodged in a household wall in the city's older parts and some are also in the church museum after being retrieved from the old church dome.

=== British Era ===
During the British era a number of forts and batteries were built in the area. These were Fort Saint Rocco, Fort Saint Leonardo, Delle Grazie Battery and Żonqor Battery.

Fort Saint Rocco was built between 1873 and 1875. It was later expanded and 3 cannons were fitted. Also, Fort Saint Leonardo was fitted with 4 cannons. These two forts took care of the neighboring seas.

The two batteries also took care of the area altogether with the Rinella battery which contains the 100 ton Armstrong Gun.

=== 1951 ===
This was a memorable year for the Żabbarin. The then Metropolitan Archbishop of Malta Michael Gonzi crowned the miraculous image of Our Lady of Grace venerated in her Sanctuary. A large crowd gathered in front of the sanctuary on Sunday 2 September 1951. During 2001 a twelve star silver diadem was placed on it by Archbishop Joseph Mercieca, in celebration of the Golden Jubilee.

=== Recent history ===
More recently, on 14 October 1975, a Vulcan B. 2, XM645 of No.9 Squadron RAF, exploded over the village. One wing full of fuel fell on Sanctuary Street, the main street of the village, and several other parts fell on the school. The children were having their break at that time and were safely evacuated by the supervising teachers and headmaster. The whole accident, which involved other parts of the city due to the violent explosion, claimed six victims. Five of them were crew members trapped in the plane. The sixth was a civilian, who was walking in the street at the time. Around 20 other individuals were injured. Various items related to the crash, including part of the Vulcan, can be seen at the Żabbar Sanctuary Museum. Some parts of this wing are now in custody of Charlene, who was present and vividly remembers this incident.

== Culture ==
=== Devotion to Our Lady of Grace ===
The city is very devout, particularly to Our Lady of Grace, to whom the city Sanctuary is dedicated. A vast number of paintings and other artefacts can be found in the Sanctuary Museum, most of which have 'VFGA' in some way or other imprinted on them. This is the Latin abbreviation for Votum Fecit, Gratiam Accipit, meaning that a grace has been asked for and it had been granted due to intercession by the Madonna tal-Grazzja (Our Lady of Grace). The paintings are about marine subjects and give large detail about ships of the Knights of Malta era. The Mattia Preti painting is found in the town's museum.

=== The Sanctuary ===
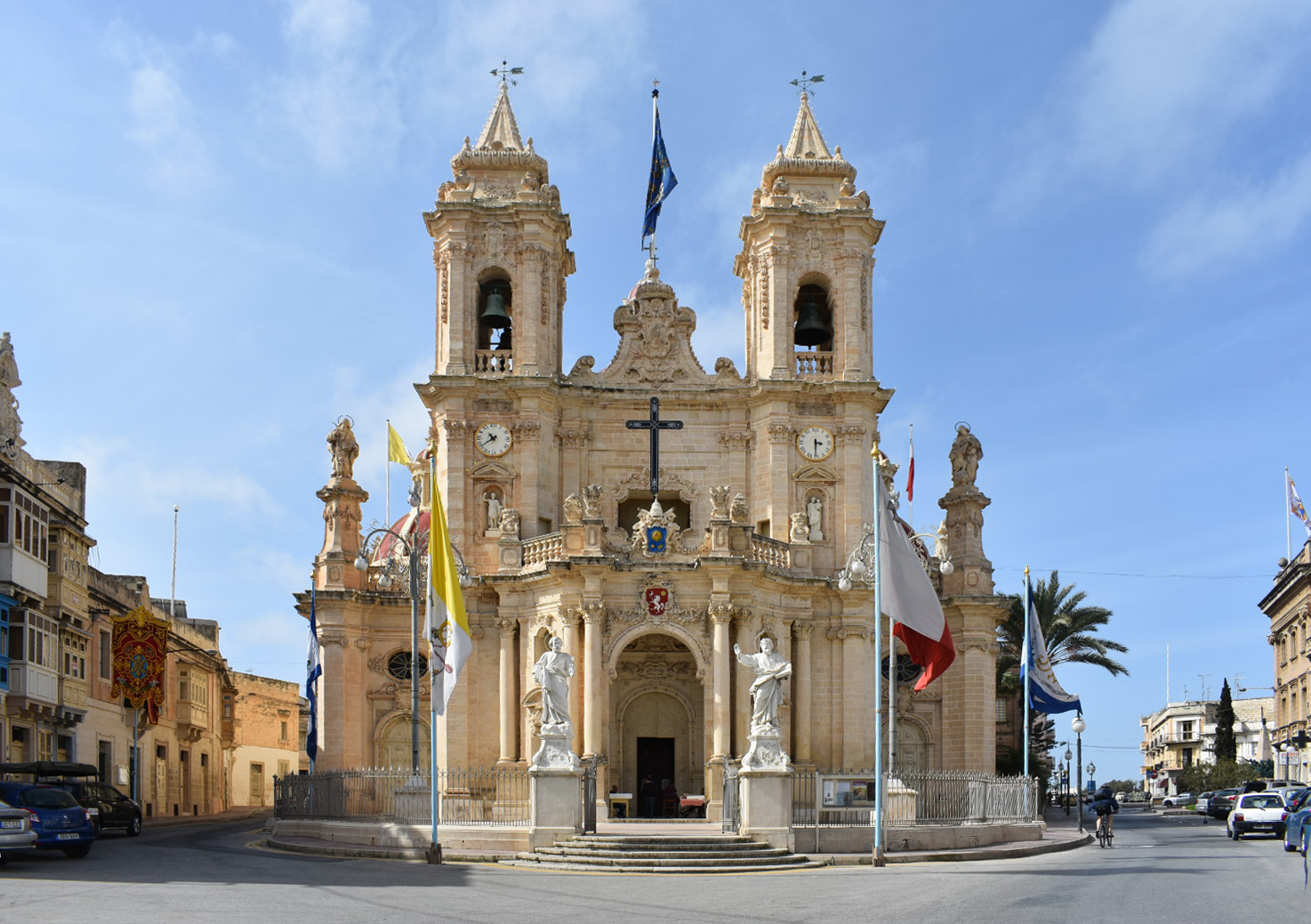
Parish Church of Our Lady of Grace, Żabbar

The building of the Church of Our Lady of Graces was started in 1641 at the instigation of the Parish Priest Don Francesco Piscopo and was completed around 1718 according to the commemoration plaque of the Consecration by Bishop Vincenzo Labini in 1784. A Maltese proverb says "a church is never finished", which is another way of stating that the people in a particular parish are never satisfied with their own church and, depending on their means, are forever the ambition that the church in one's village be better and bigger than the church in the next parish. The good people of Ħaż-Żabbar are no exception. Largely from the private funds of the Parish Priest Andrea Buhagiar, in addition to money collected from the people of Ħaż-Żabbar, work on embellishing the church was started in 1738. The Maltese architect Giovanni Bonavia redesigned the façade and two belltowers were erected; in addition the church was paved in marble and provided with a crypt. The main painting of the Madonna and Child is a work by the painter Alessio Erardi.

=== Feasts ===
Ħaż-Żabbar hosts a village feast on the first Sunday after 8 September, which features a motorcycle and bicycle pilgrimage each starting from Mosta and Rabat respectively. This is done because Our Lady of Grace is the patron of cyclists. Strong competition exists between the village's two band clubs, Società Filarmonica Maria Mater Gratiæ and Għaqda Madonna Tal-Grazzja Banda San Mikiel.

Another feast celebrated in Ħaż-Żabbar includes St. Michael the Archangel on the third Sunday after 8 September. This feast includes a solemn mass at the Zabbar Sanctuary. During the evening a brass band march is held in the town centre. The band accompanies the statue of St. Michael the Archangel. The most sensational moment during this march is when the statue of St. Michael the Archangel passes in front of the monumental statue of Our Lady of Graces, the patron of Żabbar.

A procession of Our Lady of the Rosary is also held on 7 October.

Ħadd in-Nies or People's Sunday is celebrated on the first Sunday of Lent. An afternoon pilgrimage accompanied by the titular statue, having a different starting point each year, is led by the Archbishop of Malta and ends at the Our Lady of Grace Sanctuary where a pontifical mass is celebrated. Among the celebrations for this feast one can mention the Classical Music Concerts held by the two local band clubs in the Notre Dame Hall.

=== Parish Choir ===
The Notre Dame Choir is associated with the Parish Church and Sanctuary of Our Lady of Graces. The main purpose of the choir is to take part in the liturgy of the main religious events in the parish. The choir also presents concerts throughout the year such as during Lent and the Christmas period.

=== Band Clubs ===
There are two band clubs in Żabbar.

Band Name	English Translation	Founded (year)	Colour	Nicknames
Società Filarmonica Maria Mater Gratiæ	Maria Mater Gratiae Philharmonic Society	1883	Blue	Tal-Baqra
Għaqda Madonna tal-Grazzja - Banda San Mikiel	Our Lady of Graces Club - St. Michael Band	1887	Green	Tal-Bajda

=== Holy Week ===
Società Filarmonica Maria Mater Gratiæ organises an annual Holy Week exhibition held inside the club where it is situated. The exhibition, which is named Pesah, consists of a life sized last supper, various models of the passion of the Christ, pictures made out of coloured semolina, a fretwork exhibition and other symbols which transform the whole building in an exhibition.

Għaqda Madonna Tal-Grazzja Banda San Mikiel organises an annual Holy Week exhibition. This exhibition, held inside the World War 2 Shelter in the square where the Għaqda Madonna Tal-Grazzja Banda San Mikiel club is situated, includes life size figures depicting the Passion of Christ.

=== Attractions ===
- Żabbar Sanctuary Museum
- Hompesch Gate
- Mediatrix Place (War Memorial, Hompesch Monument and Mgr. Joseph Zarb Monument)
- Sanctuary Street, named The Most Beautiful Street In Malta in 2020
- Saint James Square
- Fort Leonardo
- Il-Foss football ground
- San Klement Park

=== Memorial monuments ===
List of memorial monuments in Żabbar
Monument	Location	Photo
Agatha Barbara Memorial	Sanctuary Street	
Giuseppe Agius Muscat Memorial	Sanctuary Street	
Mgr. Joseph Zarb Memorial	Mediatrix Place	
World War II Monument	Mediatrix Place	
Grand Master Ferdinand von Hompesch Monument	Mediatrix Place	
Fredu Abela "il-Bamboċċu" Memorial	Żabbar Bandli (Playground)	
Toni Caligari Memorial	Triq il-Kbira	

== Other churches ==
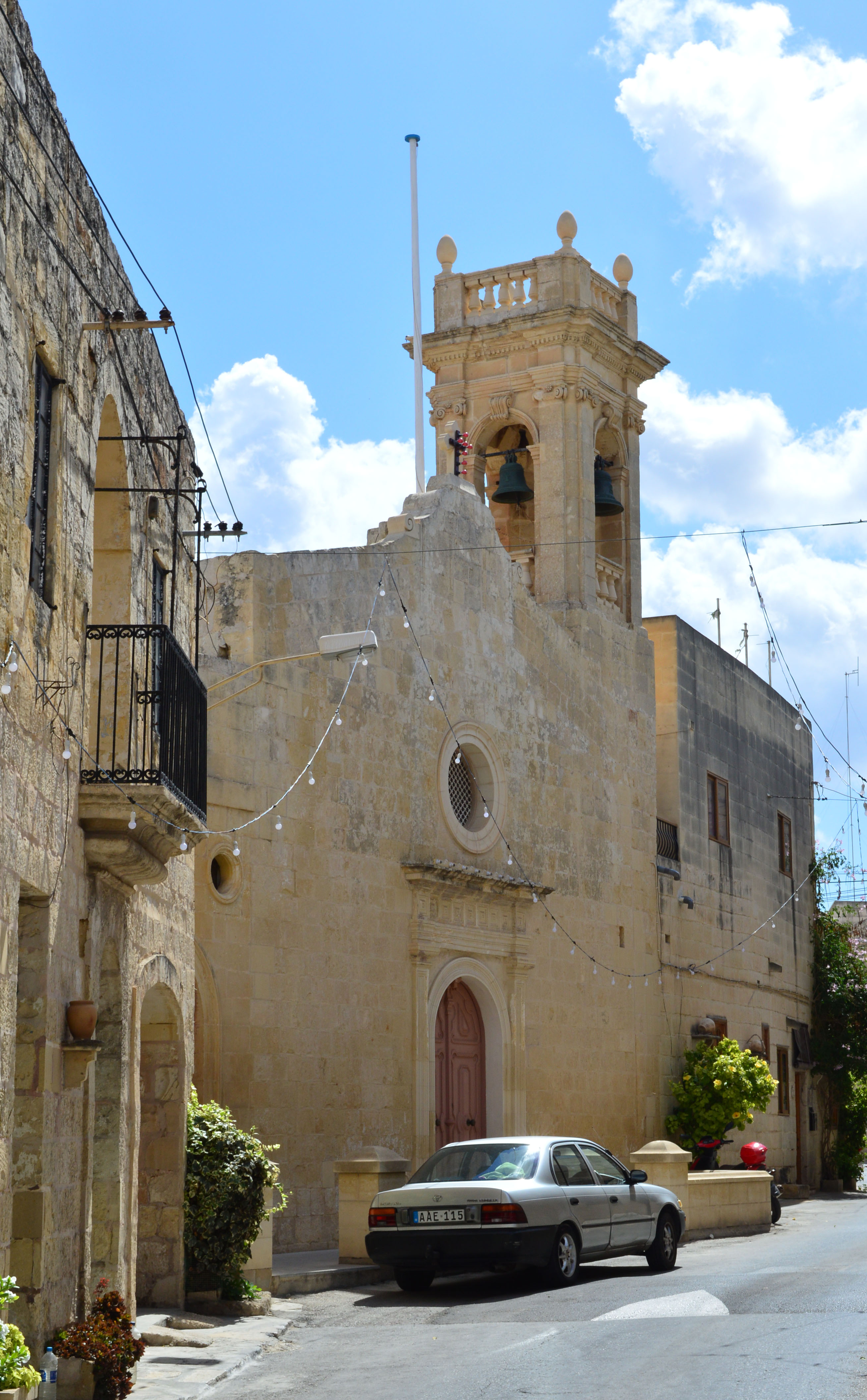
Santa Marija Chapel

- Annunciation Church: This chapel is situated in Main Street between the Labour Party and St.Patrick F.C. Clubs. It is dedicated to the Annunciation.
- Santa Marija Chapel: Dedicated to the Assumption of Mary, this chapel is found in one of the oldest quarters of Ħaż-Żabbar. A painting on the altar shows Mary being transported into Heaven with her body and soul united. A very nice statue of Our Lady of Sorrows is found in this chapel.
- Holy Cross Church: This church was inaugurated in 1993 to serve the growing community in the most modern part of Ħaż-Żabbar. The area where the Holy Cross Church is situated is known as Sant' Andrija (St. Andrew's)
- Maria Bambina Centre: This is used for the teaching of Catechism and Mass on certain days of the week.
- Saint Andrew: Built in the 15th century, this chapel stands next to Santa Domenica Church. Nowadays it is used, together with Santa Domenica Church, as the headquarters of the local scout group.
- Santa Domenica Church: This was rebuilt in 1954 after being damaged during World War 2. Together with Saint Andrew's Church, Santa Domenica Church is nowadays used as part of the local scout group's headquarters.
- Our Lady of Mercy: This chapel is located in the town's cemetery. It is used for funeral services and for mass.
- Our Lady of the Pillar: This is a very small church. In 1585 Ġuzeppi Testaferrata donated money and helped to organise the feast dedicated to Our Lady. Currently the chapel is not being used.

== Twin towns – sister cities ==
Żabbar is twinned with:

- Villabate, Italy (since September 1997)
- Eschborn, Germany

The council also has a Partnership Agreement with two other European towns, Montgeron in France and Póvoa de Varzim in Portugal. The Partnership Agreement was signed in July 2001 during the International Youth Summer Camp organised by Ħaż-Żabbar.

== Sports ==
Ħaż-Żabbar's main football team is Zabbar St. Patrick FC., including St. Patrick's Nursery FC. There are two amateur football teams in the town, and these are Ħaż-Żabbar Crystal Blues and Ħaż-Żabbar Athletics. Other sports clubs include Ħaż-Żabbar Shooting Club, Ħaż-Żabbar Boċċi Club, St Peters Boċċi Club, Ħaż-Żabbar Subbuteo Club, Zabbar Chievo Futsal Club, The Basketball Club, and Ħaż-Żabbar Amateur Racing Club.

== Notable personalities ==
President of Malta: Agatha Barbara (d.2002)

TV Presenters: Quinton Scerri (TVM) and Keith Demicoli

== Radio stations ==
- Radju MMG FM (97.5 FM). Ħaż-Żabbar
- TRN Radio

== Żabbar in postage stamps ==
The system of local councils in Malta was set up in 1993. This was commemorated by a set of 4 postage stamps depicting the coats of arms of the local councils. The Żabbar coat of arms can be seen in the top right stamp.

In 1996, the Żabbar Local Council made a request to the Postmaster General to issue a set of stamps to commemorate 200 years of Żabbar having the tile of "Citta". In 1997, a set of 3 stamps depicting the 3 cities connected with Ferdinand von Hompesch (Żabbar, Siġġiewi, and Żejtun) was issued. The Żabbar stamp depicts the Hompesch Gate.

Ferdinand von Hompesch himself was depicted on a postage stamp issued in 1998.

In 2019, the titular statue of Our Lady of Grace was depicted on a stamp that was part of the Maltese Festa series.

1993 Local Councils Stamp Set	1997 Żabbar Postage Stamp	1998 Ferdinand von Hompesch Postage Stamp
All stamps as exhibited at the Malta Postal Museum
