= Parish Church of Our Lady of Graces, Żabbar =

Parish Church and Sanctuary of Our Lady of Graces
- Knisja Arċipretali u Santwarju tal-Madonna tal-Grazzja
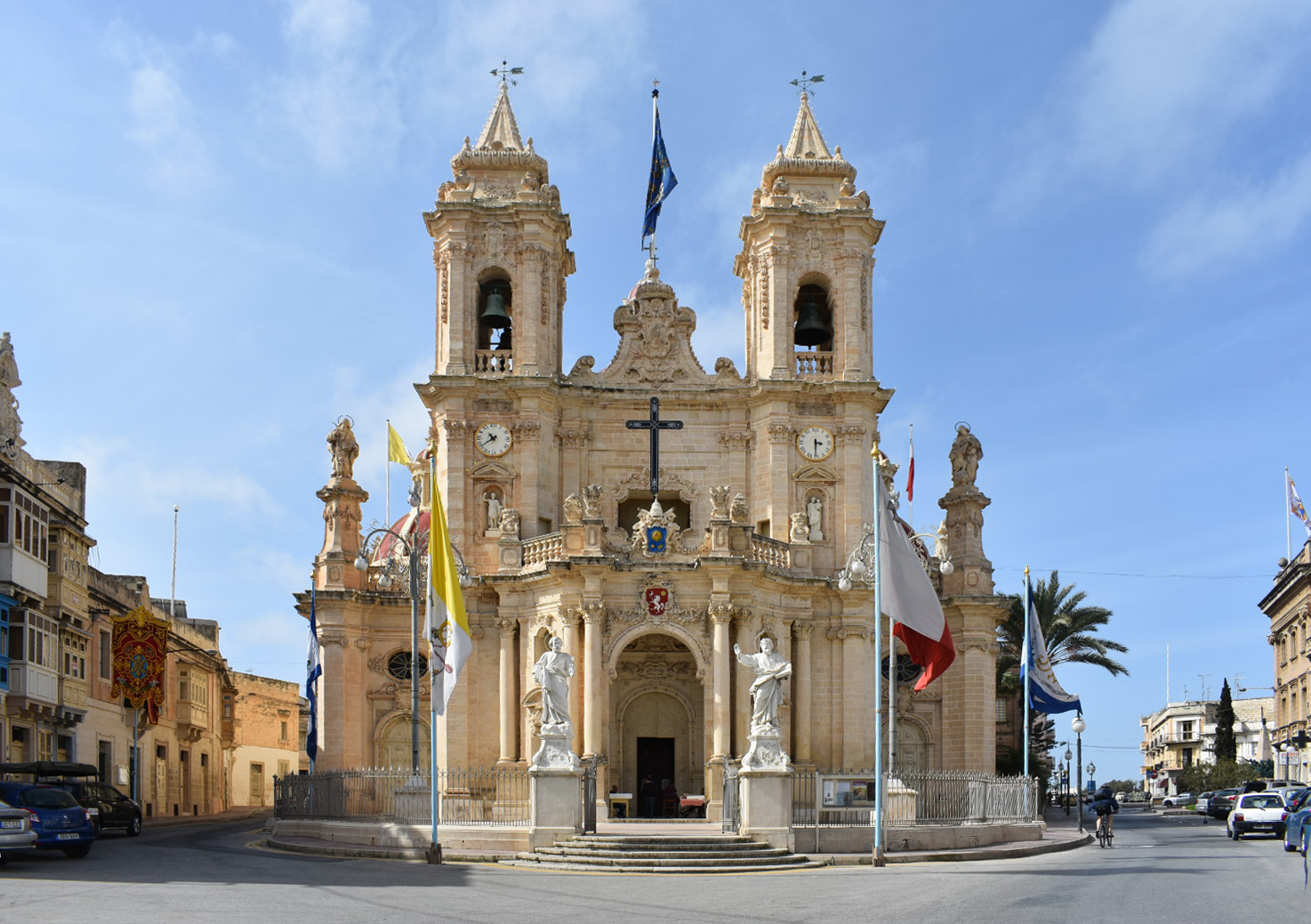
- Façade of the church in 2017
- Parish Church and Sanctuary of Our Lady of Graces
- 35°52′29.2″N 14°32′2.8″E
- Location: Żabbar
- Country: Malta
- Denomination: Roman Catholic

History
- Status: Parish church
- Dedication: Our Lady of Graces
- Dedicated: 31 October 1784

Architecture
- Functional status: Active
- Architect(s): Tommaso Dingli; Giovanni Bonavia (façade); Giuseppe Pace (dome)
- Style: Renaissance and Baroque
- Years built: 1641–1696; 1738 (façade) c. 1801 (dome and major repairs); 1926 (dome and chapels)

Specifications
- Materials: Limestone

Administration
- Archdiocese: Malta

The Parish Church and Sanctuary of Our Lady of Graces (Maltese: Knisja Arċipretali u Santwarju tal-Madonna tal-Grazzja) is a Roman Catholic parish church in Żabbar, Malta, dedicated to Our Lady of Graces. The church was originally built between 1641 and 1696 to designs of the Renaissance architect Tommaso Dingli. Its façade, an outstanding example of Maltese Baroque architecture, was built in 1738 to designs of Giovanni Bonavia. The dome was rebuilt in the early 19th century after it had been damaged during the French blockade of 1798–1800, and it was rebuilt again in the first half of the 20th century to designs of Giuseppe Pace.

== History ==
A shrine dedicated to Our Lady of Graces existed in Żabbar since at least the 16th century, and it was sacked by the Ottomans during a raid in 1614. The town became a parish in 1615, and the present church was constructed between 1641 and 1696, to designs of the architect Tommaso Dingli. The main aisle was complete by 1658, and the old church was retained as a sacristy. The church was decorated with an altarpiece painted by Alessio Erardi in 1715, and the interior was fully complete by 1723. The church radically altered in 1738, when its façade was rebuilt in the Baroque style to designs of Giovanni Bonavia. The church was dedicated on 31 October 1784. This has been hailed as one of the best examples of Maltese Baroque architecture.

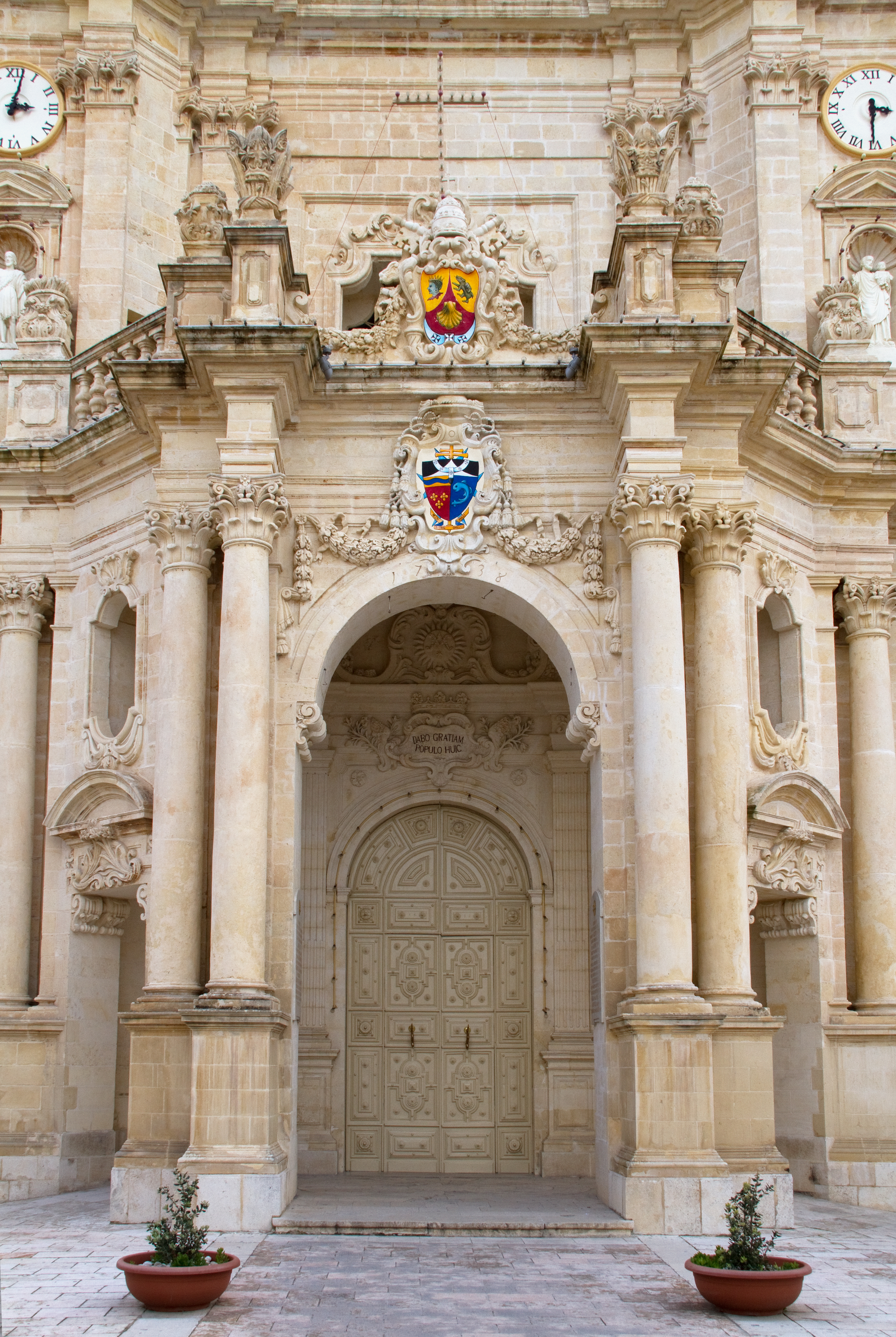
The church's portico

During the French blockade of 1798–1800, Żabbar was held by Maltese insurgents, and it was repeatedly bombarded by French forces from the nearby Cottonera Lines. During one of the bombardments in November 1799, a cannon ball hit the church's dome, and a woman was killed by falling stones. Meanwhile, Maltese insurgents built an artillery battery near the church in order to bombard French positions. After the blockade was over, the dome had to be completely rebuilt due to the damage it had sustained, while the right belfry had also suffered considerable damage and it was also repaired in 1801.

In 1926, the dome was rebuilt again and side chapels were constructed to designs of Giuseppe Pace. In 1951, the church's altarpiece was crowned by Archbishop Mikiel Gonzi, and in 2001 a silver diadem was placed on it by Archbishop Joseph Mercieca.

The church is scheduled as a Grade 1 national monument, and it is also listed on the National Inventory of the Cultural Property of the Maltese Islands.

== Architecture ==
The church has a cruciform plan with three bay naves. It has two bell towers that have a pyramidal spire, a large dome and smaller ones on the transepts.

The church's façade includes a colonnaded portico having rectangular recesses topped by an entablature, a cornice and balustrades. The façade is divided into three bays by flat pilasters topped by Corinthian capitals. It is further divided into tiers, with the middle one containing three apertures, with a window in the centre and statues on either side. The central bay has a scrolled pedestal and a cross.

== Artworks ==
The church is home to a number of notable artworks, the most significant of which is the titular painting of Our Lady of Graces. This work was painted by Maltese Baroque artist Alessio Erardi and was installed in the church in 1715. The painting depicts the Virgin Mary seated on a throne holding the Christ Child on her lap, who gestures outwards as a sign of blessing. The Virgin is shown interceding for the souls in Purgatory, who are depicted receiving her grace, while angels assist in their liberation by breaking their chains.

Accompanying the central figures are several significant saints and symbolic elements. Saint John the Baptist can be seen behind the Virgin emphasizing his role as the forerunner of Christ and witness of salvation. To one side of the Virgin is Saint Bernard of Clairvaux can be seen, and on the other the Knights of the Order of Saint John (Knights of Malta) are represented symbolically, through the likes of a ship, as often interpreted for their naval identity.

Erardi places the Virgin centrally along the vertical axis and elevated above the surrounding figures reinforcing her as the focal point of the painting and reminding her role as Mediatrix of Grace. The elevated throne further enhances the sense of divinity as well as hierarchy, as the Virgin is referred to as the Queen of Heaven.

The painting uses a rich Baroque color palette, with the Virgin shown wearing a deep blue mantle over a red garment as seen commonly in Marian iconography art. The blue mantle represents her purity and royal status, whilst the red represents motherhood and motherly traits such as love, passion and devotion. The Christ Child is rendered in soft, luminous tones which draw attention, whilst the secondary figures are depicted in subdued, earthy and undersaturated colors to maintain the visual hierarchy of the painting. The contrast of light and shadows enhance depth and drama, whilst also guiding the viewer's eye toward the sacred figures, maintaining the painting's devotional impact.

Other noteworthy paintings are the ceiling dome frescoes which depict events in the life of the Virgin Mary, and also the history of the Żabbar sanctuary itself. These frescoes combine vivid storytelling and masterful artistry while offering a glimpse into the religious and cultural sensibilities of the periods in when they were created.

Apart from these paintings, the Żabbar parish houses many more paintings painted by local artists of the time, capturing both religious and historical themes. Several intricate wooden statues, marble sculptures and ornate altarpieces created by several artisan Maltese sculptors can also be found inside the church.

== Żabbar Sanctuary Museum ==
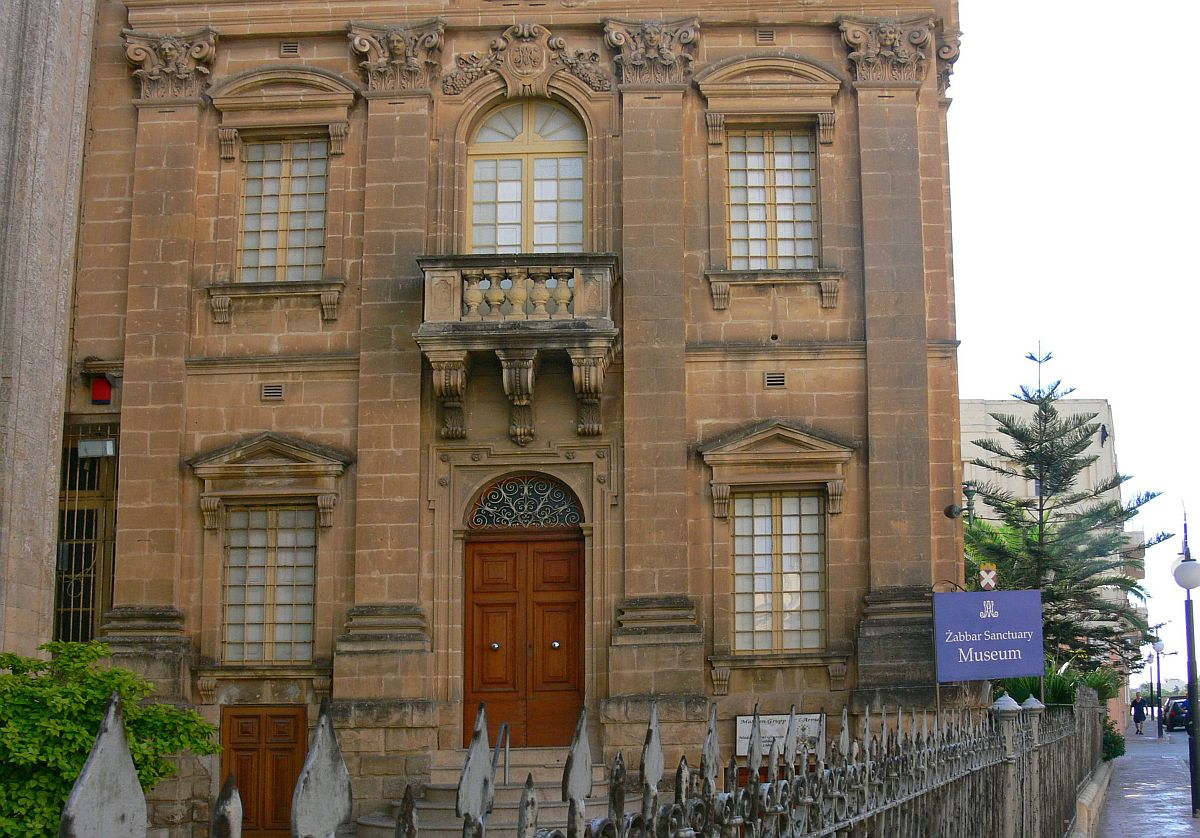
The Żabbar Sanctuary Museum

The Żabbar parish maintains a museum housed in a purposely-built building adjacent to the church. The museum was established in 1954, and it contains many artifacts, both religious and secular. Its key holdings include a collection of ex-voto paintings which were offered to Our Lady of Graces, two sedan chairs which were used by Grand Masters in the 17th and 18th centuries, and paintings and other works of art that were formerly located in the sanctuary and in other churches and chapels in Żabbar.
