= Ferdinand von Hompesch zu Bolheim =

Last Grand Master of the Knights of Malta (1744-1805)

His Most Eminent Highness, Fra Ferdinand von Hompesch zu Bolheim, O.S.I.
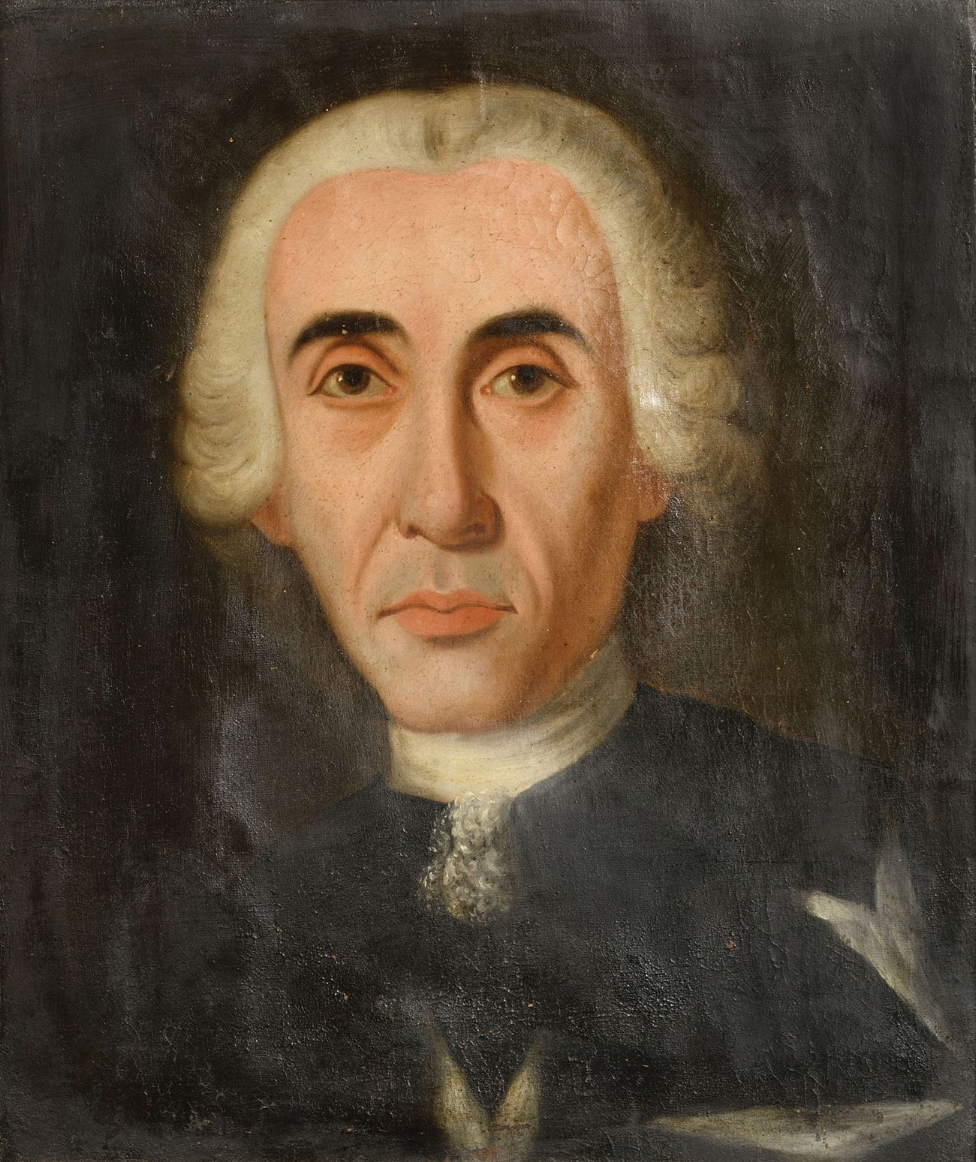

Grand Master of the Knights Hospitaller
- In office 17 July 1797 – 6 July 1799
- Preceded by: Emmanuel de Rohan-Polduc
- Succeeded by: Paul I of Russia (de iure ecclesiae)

Personal details
- Born: 9 November 1744 Bolheim, Electorate of Cologne, Holy Roman Empire
- Died: 12 May 1805 (aged 60) Montpellier, Hérault, First French Empire
- Resting place: Montpellier, Hérault, France

Military service
- Allegiance: (Sovereign Military Order of Malta) Order of Saint John
- Years of service: 1761–1799
- Rank: Grandmaster
- Battles/wars: French invasion of Malta

Ferdinand von Hompesch zu Bolheim (9 November 1744 – 12 May 1805) was the 71st Grand Master of the Knights Hospitaller, formally the Order of St. John of Jerusalem, by then better known as the Knights of Malta. He was the first German elected to the office. It was under his rule that the Order lost the island of Malta to France, after ruling there since 1530. This effectively marked the end of their sovereignty over an independent state, dating from the time of the Crusades.

== Life ==
=== Early career ===
Hompesch was born in the village of Bolheim, now part of the town of Zülpich in the Eifel region. He received the baptismal names of Ferdinand Joseph Antoine Herman Louis. He was admitted to the Knights Hospitaller on 10 July 1761, at the age of 14. For this, he needed to obtain a dispensation from the Holy See, serving as a page to the Grand Master Manuel Pinto da Fonseca. By 1768, he had been promoted to the rank of castellan. In 1770, he advanced to the rank of lieutenant, responsible for the inspection of ships and fortifications of the Order. In 1774 he was given responsibility for the island's munitions.

In late 1775, Hompesch was appointed as the Order's ambassador at the court of the Holy Roman Emperor in Vienna, a post he held for the next 25 years. In 1776, he was raised to the rank of Knight Grand Cross, making him a member of the Standing Council of the Order. During this period, he made efforts to re-unite the Protestant Bailiwick of Brandenburg with the Order. These efforts were unsuccessful, largely due to the opposition of the German knights.

In the following years, he received charge of the commandery in Rothenburg (1777), followed by those in Herford (1783), Basel and Dorlisheim (1785), Sulz, Colmar and Mülhausen (1786) as well as Villingen, in the Black Forest (1796). He was appointed Grand Bailiff of the German langue, based in Brandenburg, in 1796. On 17 July 1797 Hompesch was elected Grand Master, which made him a Prince of the Church. As Grand Master, he raised the towns of Żabbar, Żejtun and Siġġiewi to the status of cities. On 31 July 1797 he appointed a commission to assess whether the cotton industry could still provide work for the whole population of Malta and Gozo.

=== Loss of Malta ===
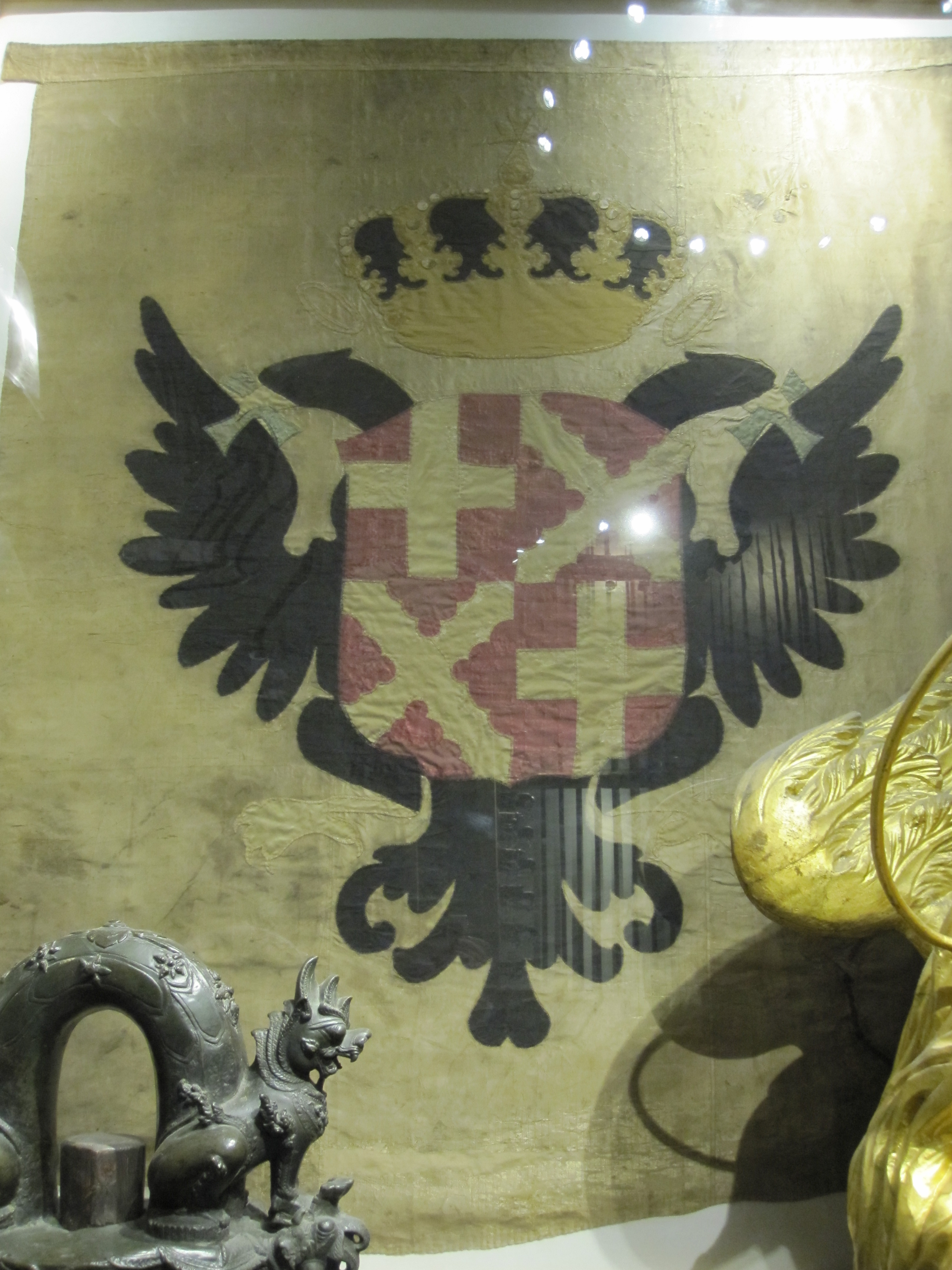
Banner bearing Ferdinand's coat of arms made in 1797

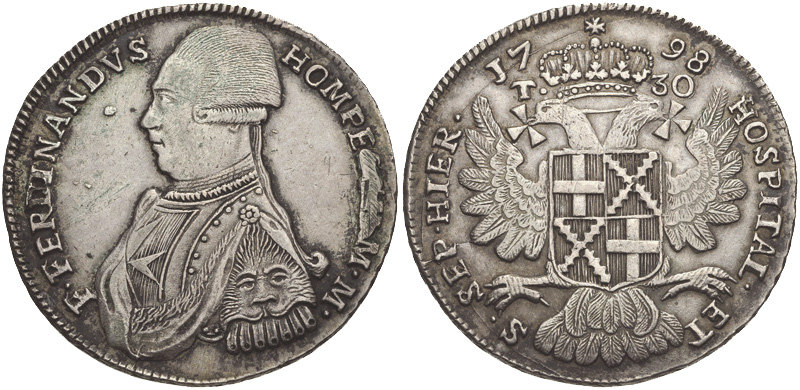
A 30 Tarì coin of Ferdinand minted in 1798

In 1798, Hompesch was warned that the French fleet sailing to invade Egypt intended to attack Malta as well. He disregarded the warning and took no action to reinforce the island's defenses. On 6 June 1798, the advance squadron of the French fleet reached Malta. One ship was permitted to enter the harbour for repairs. On 9 June the main fleet arrived, including the French fleet's overall commander, Napoleon, commanding a force of 29,000 men against Hompesch's 7,000. Bonaparte demanded free entrance to the harbour for the entire fleet with the rationale being to gain water provisions. Hompesch replied that only two ships at a time could do so. Napoleon saw it as a provocation and ordered an invasion of Malta.

On 10 June, French troops began disembarking. Resistance to the French invasion was weakened by a rebellion of local Maltese people, many of whom wished to expel of the Order from Malta. The rules of the Order prohibited fighting against fellow Christians and many of its French members did not want to fight against their countrymen. Given these factors combined with the inability of the Order's military to resist the French, Hompesch capitulated on 11 June and on the following day signed a treaty by which the Order ceded sovereignty over Malta to France. In return, France agreed to "employ all its credit at the Congress of Rastatt to procure a principality for the Grand Master, equivalent to the one he gives up". Hompesch was also promised an annual pension.

=== Final years ===
On 18 June Hompesch left Malta for Trieste, where he established a new headquarters for the Order. On 12 October he addressed a letter to foreign governments in which he protested against the French occupation of Malta. He published a second manifesto from Trieste on 23 October. On 6 July 1799 he sent two letters, one to Francis II, Holy Roman Emperor and the other to Paul I of Russia, in which he abdicated as Grand Master.

Hompesch sent no letter of abdication to the pope as required by canon law, nor did the pope accept his abdication. He settled in Ljubljana and on 7 May 1801 and again on 20 September 1801, Hompesch declared that his 1799 letters of abdication had been written for him by the Austrian government, that he had been forced to sign them, and that therefore his abdication was invalid. In 1804, he moved to Montpellier in France, where he died penniless one year later of asthma. He is buried in the Church of Saint Eulalie in Montpellier.

== Notes ==
| Preceded by Emmanuel de Rohan-Polduc | Grand Master of the Knights Hospitaller; 1797–1799 | Succeeded by Paul I of Russia de facto |
