= Cotoner =

Cotoner is a surname. Notable people with the surname include:

- Antonio Cotoner y Vallobar, was appointed Nuncio, or extraordinary Ambassador of the Studium generale of Majorca to Philip's II Royal court in Madrid
- Bernado Luis Cotoner y Ballester (1571–1641), was Member of the Dominican Order, he came to be Apostolic Inquisitor of the Kingdom of Sardinia,
- Fernando Cotoner y Chacón (1817–1888), was 1st marqués de la Cenia, Lieutenant at the Carlist Wars, Governor of Puerto Rico
- Marcos Antonio Cotoner y Sureda (1665–1749), was a Spanish noble, politician and military
- Nicolas Cotoner (1608–1680), was the 61st Prince and Grand Master of the Order of Malta
- Nicolás Cotoner, 23rd Marquess of Mondéjar (1905–1996), Spanish nobleman and military officer
- Raphael Cotoner (1601–1663), was the 60th Grand Master of the Knights Hospitaller

== See also ==
- House of Cotoner, is a noble house distinguished in the service of the Spanish Monarchy
