= House of Cotoner =

Mallorquin noble family

Cotoner
- Spanish nobility
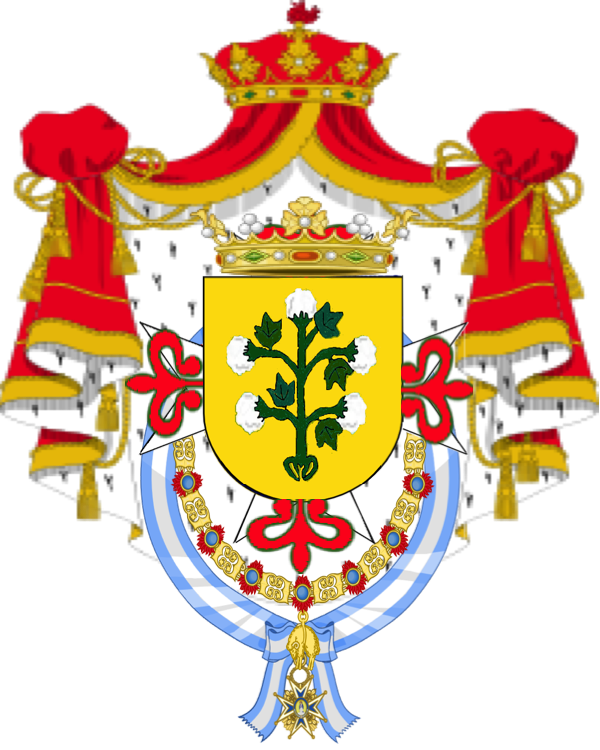
- Country: Spain
- Origin: Regnum Maioricae
- Founded: c.1370; 656 years ago
- Founder: Bernardo Cotoner
- Current head: Iñigo Cotoner y Martos; Marquess of Mondejar (GOS)
- Titles: SMOM, Grand Master (non-hereditary); Adeje, Marquess of; Amalfi, Duke (GOS); Anglesola, Marquess of; Ariany, Marquess of; Belgida, Marquess of; la Cenia, Marquess of (GOS); Coruña, Count of; Gomera, Count of; Mondejar, Marquess of (GOS); Sallent, Count of; Tendilla, Count of; Ugena, Viscount of; Villamayor, Marquess of; Villardompardo, Count of
- Styles: "HMEH" (non-hereditary) "His Excellency" "His Illustriousness"
- Estates: Cotone, Castello di Monte Pò, Castello di Montorgiali, Castello di

The House of Cotoner is a noble house distinguished in the service of the Spanish Monarchy until the 20th century.

== History ==
=== Italian origins ===
The house's origins go back to the Italian city state of Republic of Siena (Italy).

When the Cotoner family grew in numbers, some of its members left Tuscany and established branches in various other places. Some went to Ascoli, where they founded and built the Castle of Monte Pastillo in Sicily, where they held the principality of Castelnuovo and Santa Caterina, keeping the memory of their Signoria del Cotoné in the Republic of Siena.

One of those branches was to become one of the so-called "Nou Cases" (meaning Nine Houses) in the Kingdom of Majorca, for there were nine "nobilis et Antique familiae'". These nine families were also incorporated into the Nobility governing and legislative bodies, like all the other houses, of the Kingdom but differed by the quality of their lineage.

=== Settlement in Majorca ===
Location of the Kingdom of Majorca in relation to the other territories that comprised the Crown of Aragon in the 15th century.

Bernardo Cotoner is first documented in the Kingdom of Majorca when setting up a "beneficio" for the Parish of Santa Eulalia and then again on 1363, acquiring a farmhouse ("alqueria") in Valldemossa. On July 23, 1370 Letters patent were issued by Peter IV of Aragon confirming tax exception as well as their nobility for them participants in the conquest and his successors.

His son Nicolas Cotoner y Genovard had three sons: Nicolas, Bernardo y Gabriel Cotoner y Saguals, setting up three distinct branches. Bernardo Cotoner y Saguals earned on July 18, 1463, for his merits and services, privilege for perpetuity in the "braç militar" of the Kingdom of Mallorca.

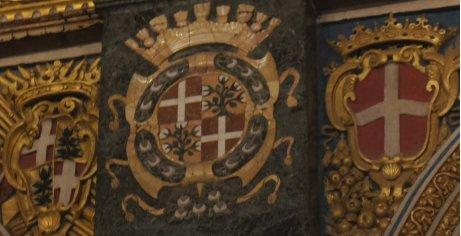
Coat of Arms of Raphael y Nicolas Cotoner, Grand Masters of the Order of Malta in the 17th century. Chapel of Saint George, or the Langue of Aragon, St John's Co-Cathedral, in the island of Malta.

It will be however, the great-grandson of Nicolas Cotoner y Saguals, Antonio Cotoner y Vallobar who will effectively consolidate the influence of the family. Antonio had been acting in the Res publica of his country, having demonstrated special talents and deserving the trust of the sworn representatives of the city and the Kingdom of Majorca to perform an important commission. Perpetual privilege was issued in October 18, 1569 effectively knighted 1572 by Philip II of Spain.

Of special relevance, is the historic and close relationship of this family with the Knights Hospitaller also known as Order of Malta with the ascension of Raphael and Nicolas Cotoner to the sovereign dignity of Grand Masters.

== Notable members ==
- Antonio Cotoner y Vallobar, (born 1518), Nuncio or extraordinary Ambassador of the Kingdom of Majorca in 1571, and facilitated the royal sanction to establish a "Real Audiencia'" in Majorca. He was issued perpetual privilege to nobility in October 18, 1569 and was knighted by Philip II of Spain own hands in 1572.
- Bernado Luis Cotoner y Ballester (*1571 +1641), son of Antonio Cotoner y Vallobar in his second marriage he dedicated his life to the study of law, and at the University of Avignon received his Tassels both in Canon law and Roman Law. In good age he joined the Ecclesial Estate. Member of the Dominican Order, he came to be Apostolic Inquisitor of the Kingdom of Sardinia, General Inquisitor in the kingdoms of Majorca, Aragon, Valencia and in the Principality of Catalonia. He died in 1641 when acting as "visitador" to the Holy office in Sicily.
- Fra' Rafael Cotoner y Oleza; 1601 – 20 October 1663) was the 60th Grand Master of the Knights Hospitaller or, as it is already known by that time, the Order of Malta, serving in that position from 5 June 1660 to his death on 20 October 1663 following the brief reign of Annet de Clermont-Gessant. After his death, he was succeeded as Grand Master by his brother, Nicolas.
- Fra' Nicolas Cotoner y Oleza; 1608, Mallorca – 29 April 1680, Malta) was the 61st Prince and Grand Master of the Order of Malta, between 1663 and 1680. He was the son of Marc Antoni Cotoner i de Santmartí and brother of the previous Grandmaster, Rafael Cotoner.
- Marcos Antonio Cotoner y Sureda (1665–1749), was a Spanish noble, politician and military. 1st Marquess of Ariany and I Regidor of Palma de Mallorca following the Nueva Planta decrees issued by Philip V of Spain.
- Fernando Cotoner y Chacón (1817–1888), 1st Marquess de la Cenia, GOS, OCIII, KOC, Lieutenant at the Carlist Wars, Governor of Puerto Rico, interim Minister of War and Director general of the Civil Guard.Captain General of the Balearic Islands. Senator for life for the Balearic Islands.
- Nicolás Cotoner y Cotoner, 23rd Marquess of Mondéjar, 25th Count of Tendilla, 7th Marquess of Ariany, GOS, KOGF, OCIII, KOC, OM (19 October 1905 – 6 March 1996), was a Spanish nobleman and military officer, head of the Royal Household of Spain under Juan Carlos I, from 1975 to 1990.
