= Bernado Luis Cotoner y Ballester =

Grand Inquisitor, Crown of Aragon

Bernardo Luis Cotoner
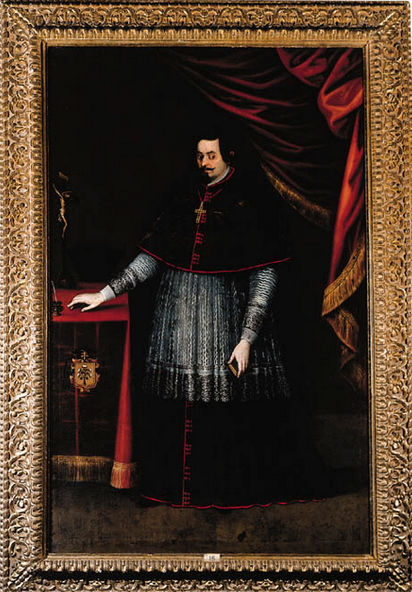
- Bernardo Luis Cotoner
- Born: 1571; The City of the Kingdom of Majorca
- Died: 1641 (aged 69–70); Kingdom of Sicily
- Education: University of Avignon
- Occupations: Crown of Aragon's Inquisitor in Aragon, Majorca, Valencia and the Principality of Catalonia.
- Father: Don Antonio Cotoner y Vallobar
- Relatives: Fra' Raphael Cotoner (nephew); Fra' Nicolas Cotoner (nephew)
- Family: House of Cotoner

Bernado Luis Cotoner y Ballester (1571–1641), son of Antonio Cotoner y Vallobar in his second marriage, dedicated his life to the study of law, and at the University of Avignon received his Tassels both in Canon law and Roman Law.

In good age he joined the Ecclesial Estate. Member of the Dominican Order, he came to be Apostolic Inquisitor of the Kingdom of Sardinia, in 1629 became Inquisitor in the kingdoms of Majorca, Aragon, Valencia and in the Principality of Catalonia. He died in 1641 when acting as "visitador" to the Holy office in Sicily.
