= Saint George on Horseback =

Painting by Mattia Preti

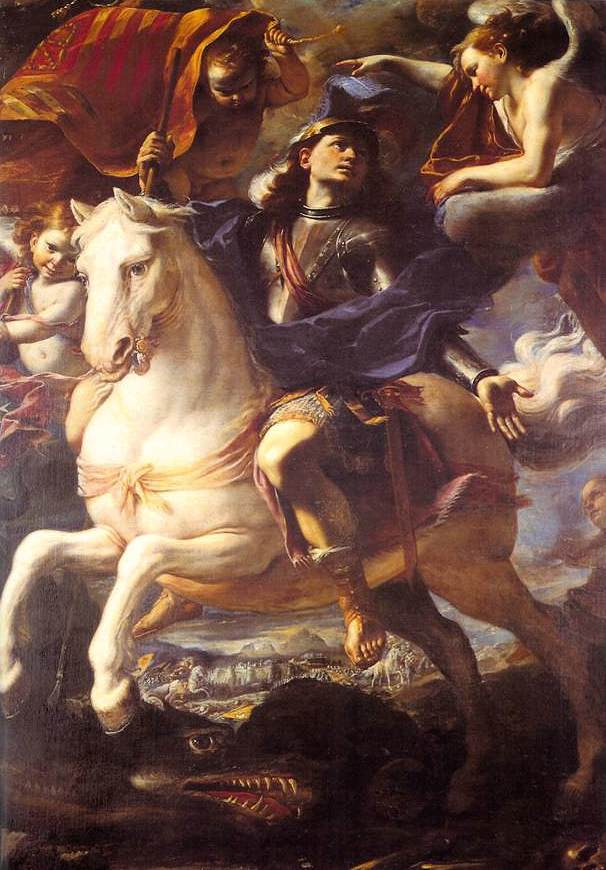
- Artist: Mattia Preti
- Year: 1658
- Medium: oil on canvas
- Dimensions: 275 cm × 207 cm (108 in × 81 in)
- Location: St. John's Co-Cathedral, Valletta, Malta

Saint George on Horseback is an oil painting by Mattia Preti painted in 1658. It is the altarpiece of the Chapel of the Langue of Aragon in St. John's Co-Cathedral, Valletta, Malta. The painting was Preti's first work in Malta, and it is regarded as one of his masterpieces and one of the best examples of Neapolitan Baroque art.

== Description ==
The painting is an oil on canvas with dimensions of 275 x 207 centimeters. It is found in the Chapel of the Langue of Aragon in St. John's Co-Cathedral, in Valletta.

== Analysis ==
It is a large baroque image of Saint George, which serves as an altarpiece. It was commissioned by Grand Master Martin de Redin.

== Sources ==
- Marica Mercalli; Italian, Ministero per i Beni e le Attività Culturali (2005). Mattia Preti : a bridge between Italy and Malta; the painting St George and the dragon after the restoration [Mattia Preti : un ponte tra Italia e malta; il dipinto con San Giorgio e il drago dopo il restauro] (in English and Italian). Rome: Gangemi Editore. p. 93. ISBN 9788849207873. OCLC 886448368.
