= Giovanni Paolo Lascaris =

Grand Master of the Knights Hospitaller (1560–1657)

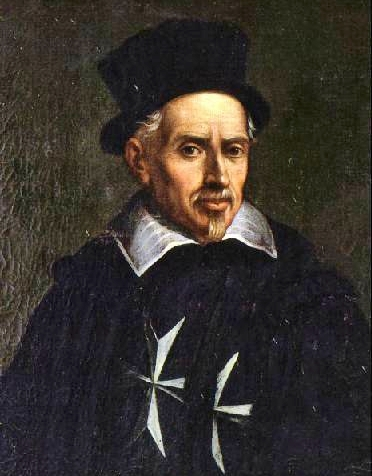

Grand Master of the Order of Saint John
- In office 16 June 1636 – 14 August 1657
- Monarch: King Philip III
- Preceded by: Antoine de Paule
- Succeeded by: Martin de Redin

Personal details
- Born: 28 June 1560 Castellar, County of Nice, Duchy of Savoy
- Died: 14 August 1657 (aged 97) Malta, Hospitaller Malta
- Resting place: St. John's Co-Cathedral
- Profession: Grandmaster of the Knights of St. John

Military service
- Allegiance: (Sovereign Military Order of Malta) Order of Saint John

Giovanni Paolo Lascaris di Ventimiglia e Castellar (Maltese: Laskri) (28 June 1560 – 14 August 1657) was an Italian nobleman and Grand Master of the Knights of Malta.

== Early life ==
Lascaris was born on 28 June 1560, the second son of Giannetto Lascaris and his wife Franceschetta di Agostino Lascaris of the ancient family of the Counts of Ventimiglia, related to the Lascaris who were emperors of the Byzantine Nicaean Empire.

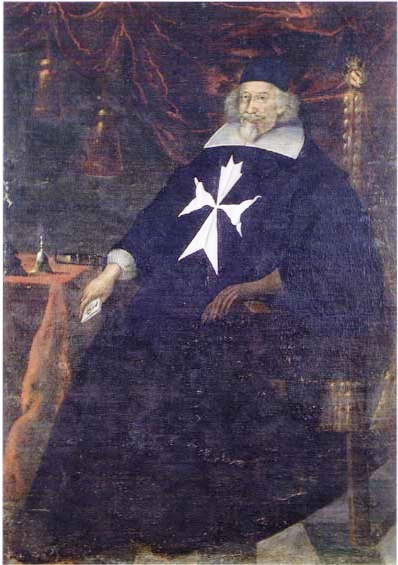
Portrait of Giovanni Paolo Lascaris in old age

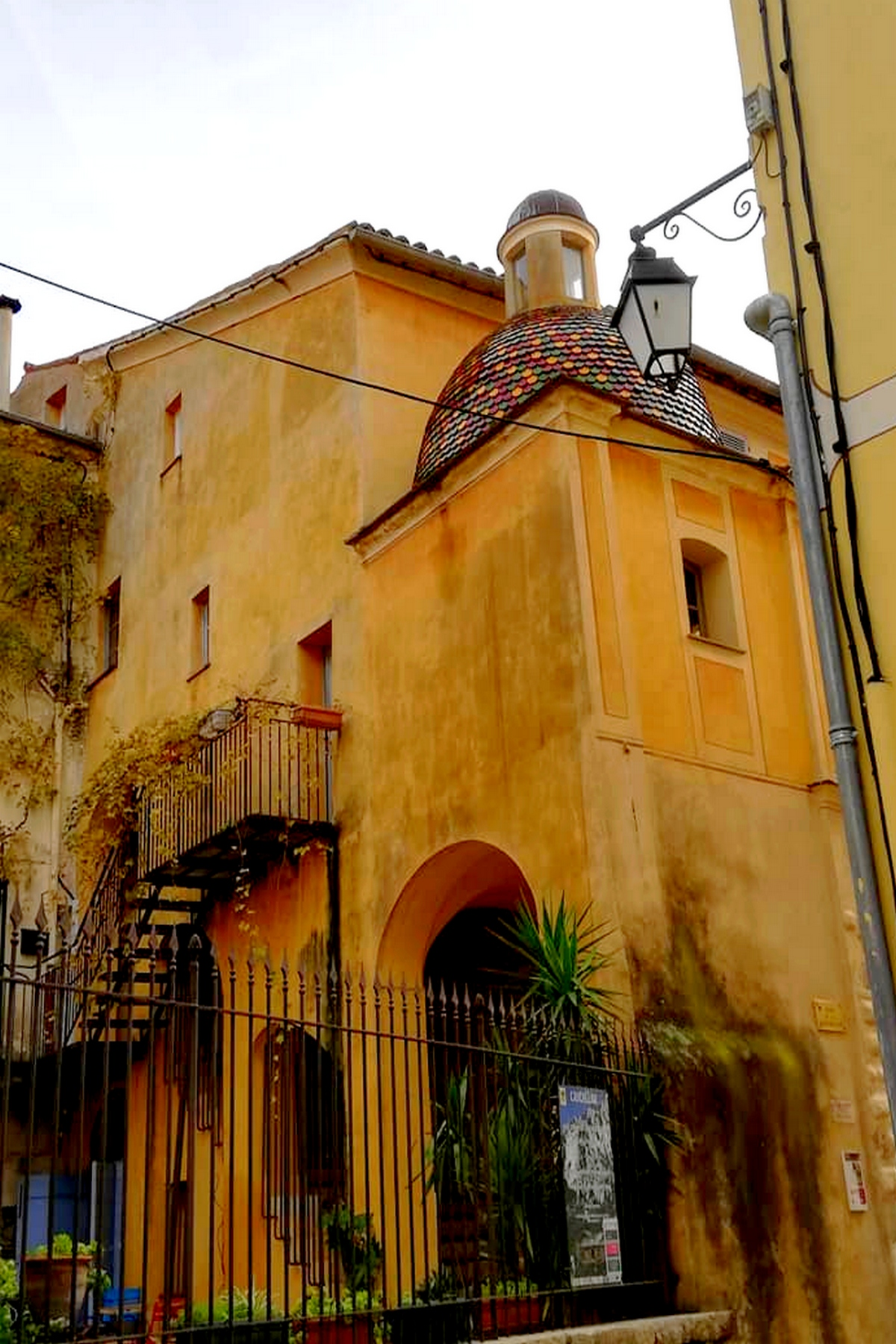
Palais Palazzo Lascaris de Vintimille à Castellar

In 1584, he entered the Order of St. John of Jerusalem. As a member of the order he lived for over thirty years in a priory and was responsible for a range of monastic functions. He was put in charge of the order's grain supplies and later, in 1615, the order's furnaces across the island. He comported himself well and was promoted to master of the "St Anthony" prison.

In 1632 he was sent as ambassador to the Kingdom of Spain.

On the death of Grand Master Antoine de Paule, there were three candidates for election as Grand Master; Lascaris, Signorino Gattinara (about whom little is known) and Martin de Redin. Inquisitor Fabio Chigi (later Pope Alexander VII) attended as representative of Pope Urban VIII. Failing to secure enough votes for his own election, de Redin encouraged his supporters to instead side with Lascaris. On 16 June 1636, Lascaris was elected Grand Master of the Order of Malta, a position he held until his death.

== As Grand Master ==
=== Lascaris towers ===
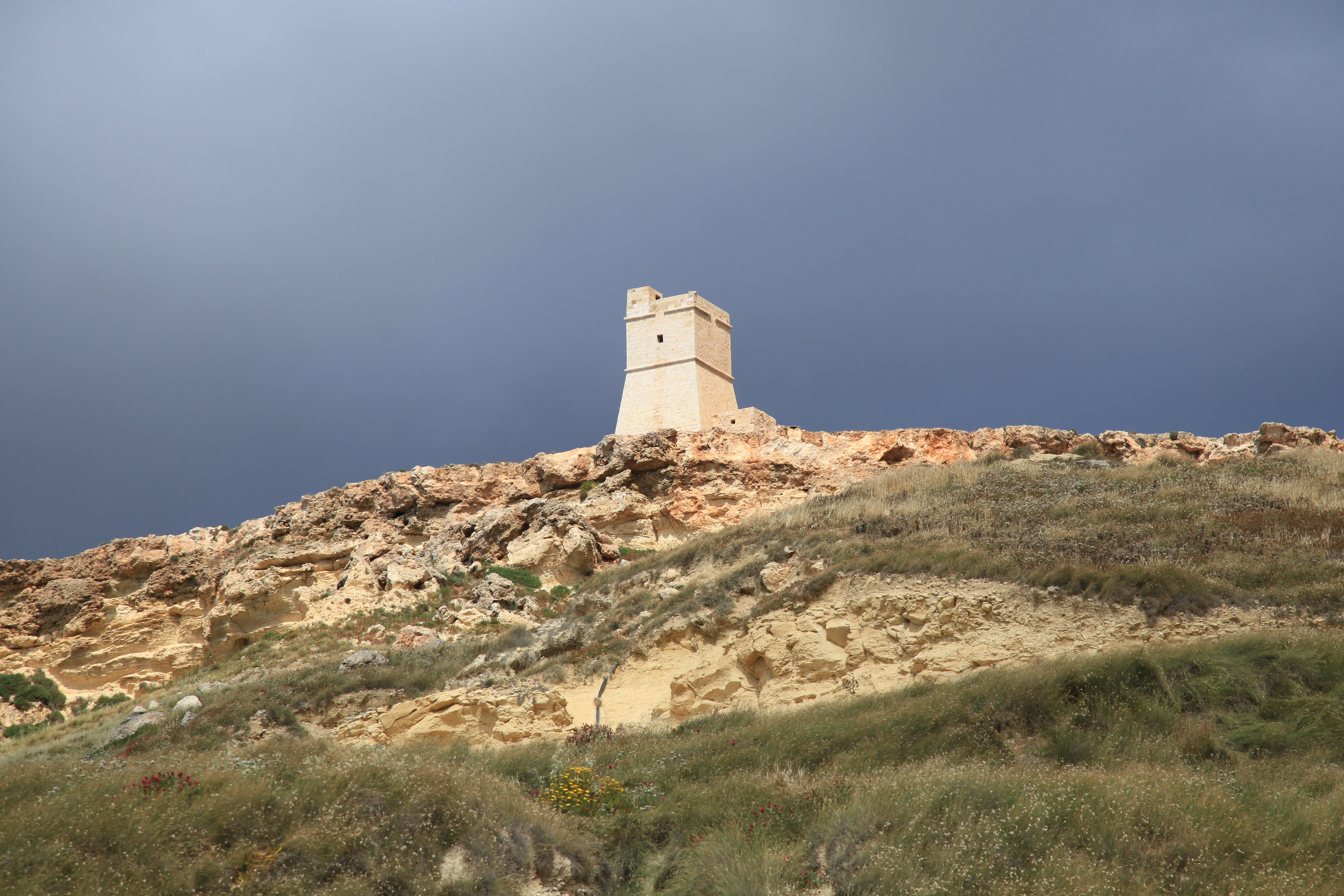
Lippija Tower, on the east side of Valletta, was the first of the Lascaris towers

The following year, Lascaris commissioned a series of towers as fortifications around the island of Malta, now known as the Lascaris towers. The towers were designed and built by papal military architect, Vincenzo Maculani. Lascaris Battery was named in his honor.

Martin de Redin, who succeeded Lascaris as Grand Master of the Order, commissioned further towers and the combined collection of fortifications is often referred to as the De Redin towers.

=== Lascaris' ban ===
In 1639, Lascaris implemented a ban on women wearing masks or attending masked balls during carnivale. The ban was unpopular and locals blamed Lascaris' Jesuit confessor, Father Cassia. They took to the streets to poke fun at the Jesuits and Lascaris had one of the instigators arrested. A Jesuit college was ransacked as retaliation and those responsible demanded that Lascaris banish the Jesuit order from Malta, which he did for a short time while tensions abated. The incident is still remembered today as Lascaris' ban.

The common Maltese idiom "wiċċ Laskri" (lit. face of Lascaris) is used when describing a sad or frustrated person.

=== Wars of Castro ===
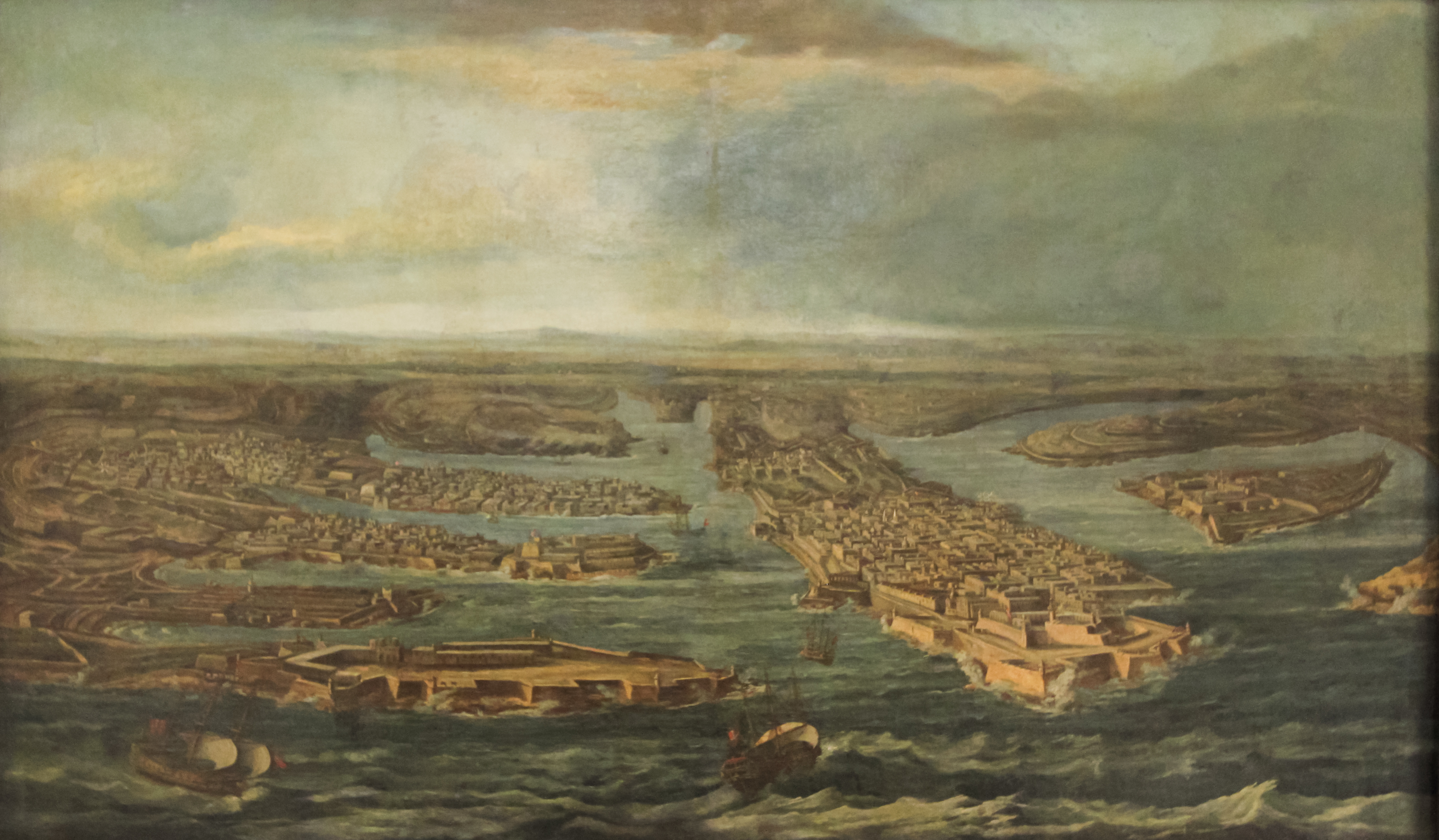
Giuseppe Caloriti's View of Valletta and the Three Cities with the galleon "Lascara" (named in honour of Lascaris) entering the harbour of Malta's capital, Valletta.

Also in 1639, Pope Urban VIII asked Lascaris to intervene in the First War of Castro by sending naval forces owned by the order to assist papal troops against the Dukes of Parma; specifically galleons and other warships. But the Dukes of Parma, as well as the Duchy of Venice, the Duchy of Florence and Duchy of Modena (who were allied with them), appealed to Lascaris not to provide the pope with support.

Lascaris played a dangerous double game; he sent warships to aid the pope while assuring the Dukes they were there only as a show of force and would not participate in the conflict. Sure enough, conflict was limited to on-land skirmishes and Lascaris' troops did not fire a single shot.

=== Caribbean colonies ===
In 1651, the Knights, with Lascaris's approval, bought the island of Saint-Christophe, along with the dependent islands of Saint Croix, Saint Barthélemy, and Saint Martin, from the failing Compagnie des Îles de l'Amérique. The Knights' ambassador to the French court, Jacques de Souvré, signed the agreement. The Order's proprietary rights were confirmed in a treaty with France two years later: while the king would remain sovereign, the Knights would have complete temporal and spiritual jurisdiction on their islands. The only limits to their rule were that they could only send French knights to govern the islands, and upon the accession of each new King of France they were to provide a gold crown worth 1,000 écus. In 1665, after Lascaris's death, the Knights sold their islands back to France, ending their brief colonial project.

=== The Gozo monastery ===
In October 1652 Pope Innocent X closed a number of monasteries including one on Gozo. However, it was opened again after just four months thanks to intervention from Lascaris who was close to the monks of the order. A portrait of Lascaris still hangs in the monastery today.

== Death ==
He died on 14 August 1657 at age 97. As of 2026, Lascaris remains the oldest verified head of state in office.

== See also ==
- List of grand masters of the Knights Hospitaller

Preceded by Antoine de Paule	Grand Master of the Knights Hospitaller; 1635–1657	Succeeded by Martin de Redin
