= Nicolás Cotoner, 23rd Marquess of Mondéjar =

The Most Excellent The Marquess of Mondéjar GE
- Coat of Arms of Nicolás Cotoner, 23rd Marquess of Mondéjar

Head of the Royal Household of Spain
- In office 1975–1990
- Monarch: Juan Carlos I
- Preceded by: Office established
- Succeeded by: The Count of Latores

Personal details
- Born: 19 October 1905 Palma de Mallorca, Spain
- Died: 6 March 1996 (aged 90) Madrid, Spain

Military service
- Allegiance: Nationalist faction Spanish State; Spanish Army
- Battles/wars: Spanish Civil War

Nicolás Cotoner y Cotoner, 23rd Marquess of Mondéjar, 24th Count of Tendilla, 7th Marquess of Ariany, GE (19 October 1905 – 6 March 1996), was a Spanish nobleman and military officer, head of the Royal Household of Spain under Juan Carlos I, from 1975 to 1990.

== Nobility and titles ==
Cotoner is of the House of Cotoner, knight of the Order of the Golden Fleece and Grandee of Spain, 22nd Marquess of Mondéjar, 23rd Count of Tendilla, 7th Marquess of Ariany, knight of the Order of Calatrava and knight of the Order of Malta.

== Biography ==
Bachelor of Law, was a lieutenant during the Spanish Civil War, where is seriously injured, receives the individual military medal and reached the rank of general of cavalry after joining this weapon and studying at the Cavalry Academy of Valladolid.

He was married to María Trinidad Martos y Zabálburu, Viscountess of Ugena, heiress of a great family fortune and lands in Murcia.

He succeeded first in the title of Count of Tendilla (following the family tradition) and as such enters in January 1955 in the group of people dedicated to the education of the future King Juan Carlos I. Cotoner didn't succeed to the Marquessate of Mondéjar until after the death of his mother, by letter of succession of the 9 of May 1956.

In 1955, he was assigned as preceptor of the then Prince of Asturias, Juan Carlos de Borbón as a horse riding teacher and for his entry into the General Military Academy of Zaragoza.

He was also a link between Juan Carlos and his father, Juan de Borbón, exiled in Portugal, at critical moments such as the position of the Prince of Asturias in the succession to the head of the State after the death of General Franco.

Don Juan appointed him head of the House of His Royal Highness the Prince of Spain, as heir to the throne in 1964, for eleven years later, on the death of Franco and with the accession to the throne as king of Spain, to be appointed Chief of the Royal House on 2 December 1975, position in which he remained until 22 January 1990, being replaced by Sabino Fernández Campo. He held the honorary title of Head of the King's House.

Another outstanding position he held was the presidency of the National Heritage Board of Directors that he obtained in 1976. He was one of the founders of the Instituto Estudios Bursátiles, which was established at the Royal Palace in 1988.

The king of Spain described him as "adoptive father" and "faithful counselor". Nicolás Cotoner showed himself to be a man of absolute confidence in the management of the national public interest, standing out during the complicated moments of the transition to democracy and during the failed Tejero coup on 23 February 1981, where maintained an active attitude of support for the king, facilitating contacts between the Crown and the different commands of the army.

He was in possession of numerous high distinctions, amongst them the Golden Fleece that was granted to him in 1977.

He died at the age of ninety on 6 March 1996.

== See also ==
- Royal Household of Spain
- Spanish transition to democracy
