= Martin de Redin =

Spanish military and political figure

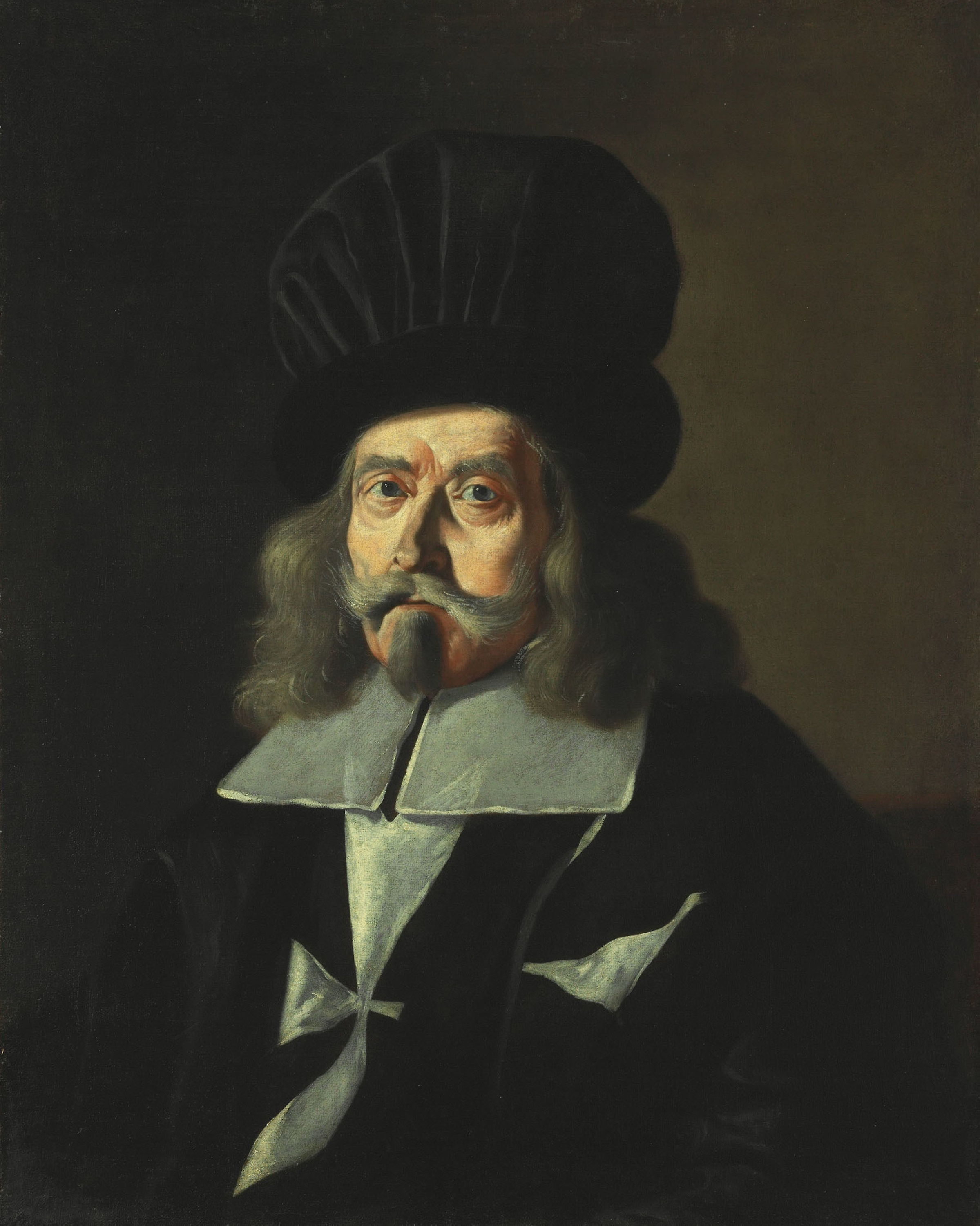
- Portrait by Mattia Preti

Viceroy of Sicily
- In office 1656–1657
- Monarch: King Philip III
- Preceded by: Juan Tellez-Girón y Enriquez de Ribera
- Succeeded by: Pedro Rubeo

Grand Master of the Order of Saint John
- In office 17 August 1657 – 6 February 1660
- Monarch: King Philip III
- Preceded by: Giovanni Paolo Lascaris
- Succeeded by: Annet de Clermont-Gessant

Personal details
- Born: 1579 Pamplona, Navarre
- Died: 6 February 1660 (aged 80–81) Malta
- Resting place: St. John's Co-Cathedral

Military service
- Allegiance: Kingdom of Sicily (Sovereign Military Order of Malta) Order of Saint John

Fra' Martin de Redin (Pamplona, 1579 – Malta, 6 February 1660) was a Spanish military and political figure, and the 58th Prince and Grand Master of the Order of Malta. He became Grand Prior of the Order of Malta of Navarra in 1641, Governor of Galicia in 1642 and Viceroy of Sicily in 1656.

== Biography ==
Martin de Redin had a military career and fought in many battles of the Thirty Years' War, like the Valtellina War, the Battle of Fleurus (1622), the Siege of Fuenterrabía (1638) and the Battle of Lleida (1642). His military experience and the merits he acquired during these years of defensive warfare in the Pyrenees, led to his promotion to the position of Governor and Captain general of Galicia in 1642. He was also Viceroy of Sicily between 1656 and 1657.

He was elected Grand Master of the Knights Hospitaller in 1657 after the death of Giovanni Paolo Lascaris. During his rule, he commissioned the building of 13 de Redin watch towers around the coast of Malta. These towers created a line of communication around the island to give warning of the approach of corsairs and pirates.

De Redin also created a corps of 4,000 musketeers, and brought in food and supplies from Sicily when Malta suffered a shortage during his reign.

In 1658, the first granaries in Valletta were excavated near Fort St Elmo to serve as storage facilities for grain that was imported from Sicily. Only 39 of the original 70 granaries are still visible, with the remainder having been destroyed to accommodate the road and adjacent building structures. The flask-shaped cavities were cut out of rock and came in different sizes, with a capacity ranging between 50 and 500 tonnes of grain. The smaller ones measured around 4.5 metres in diameter and about 9 metres in depth, featuring narrow cylindrical necks 1 to 2.5 metres in width.

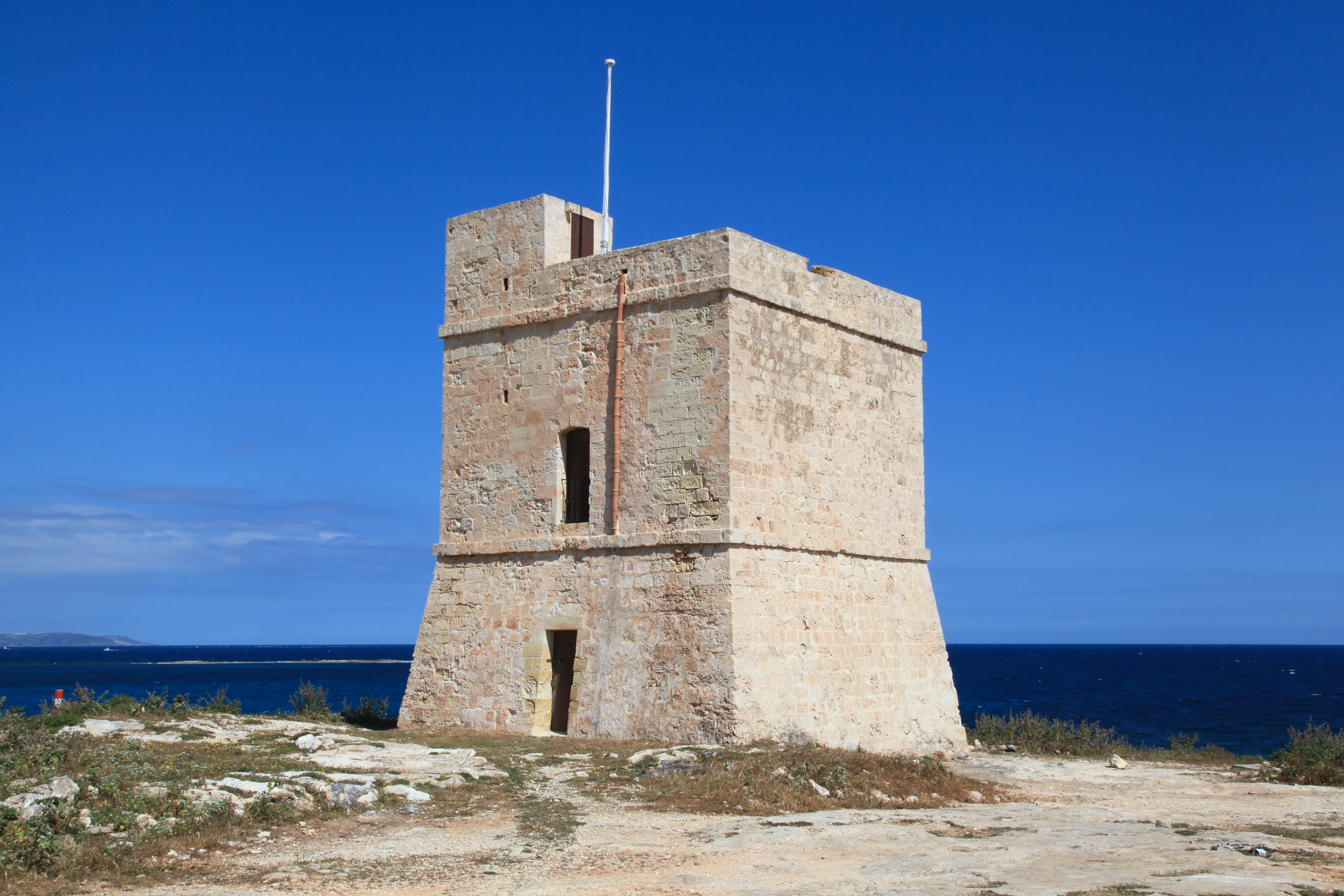
Saint Mark's Tower in Baħar iċ-Ċagħaq was completed in 1658. It was the third of the De Redin towers.

| Preceded by Giovanni Paolo Lascaris | Grand Master of the Knights Hospitaller; 1657–1660 | Succeeded by Annet de Clermont-Gessant |
