= Annet de Clermont-Gessant =

Grand Master of the Knights Hospitaller

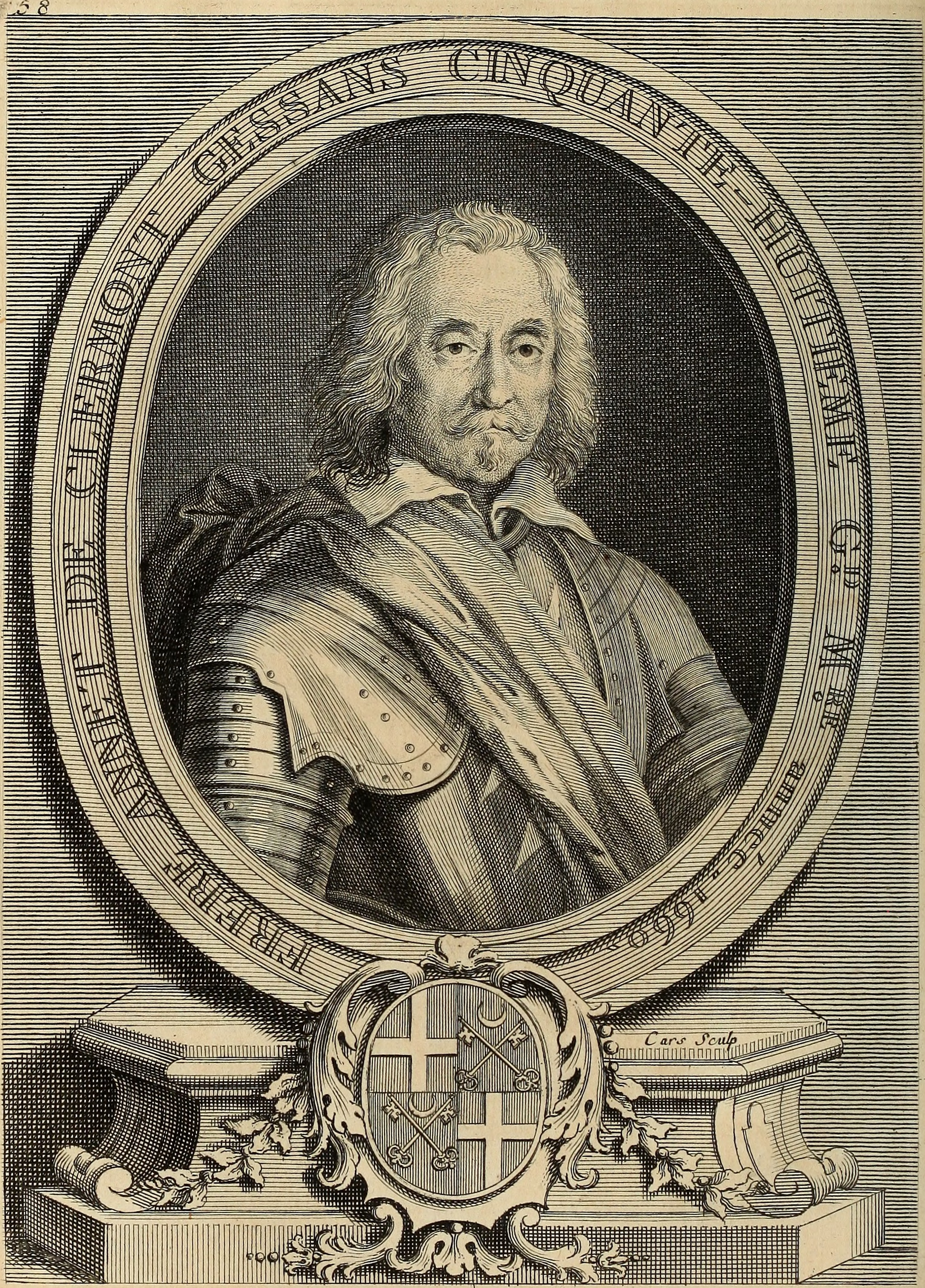

Grand Master of the Order of Saint John
- In office 9 February – 2 June 1660
- Monarch: King Philip III
- Preceded by: Martin de Redin
- Succeeded by: Raphael Cotoner

Personal details
- Born: 1587 Auvergne, France
- Died: 2 June 1660 (aged 72–73) Malta
- Resting place: St. John's Co-Cathedral

Military service
- Allegiance: (Sovereign Military Order of Malta) Order of Saint John

Fra' Annet de Clermot-Gessant (1587 – 2 June 1660) was the 59th Prince and Grand Master of the Order of Malta. He only reigned as Grandmaster of the Order in 1660. He was buried in the Chapel of Auvergne in St. John's Co-Cathedral.

Preceded by Martin de Redin	Grand Master of the Knights Hospitaller; 1660	Succeeded by Raphael Cotoner
