= St John's Co-Cathedral =

Catholic co-cathedral in Malta

- Kon-Katidral ta' San Ġwann
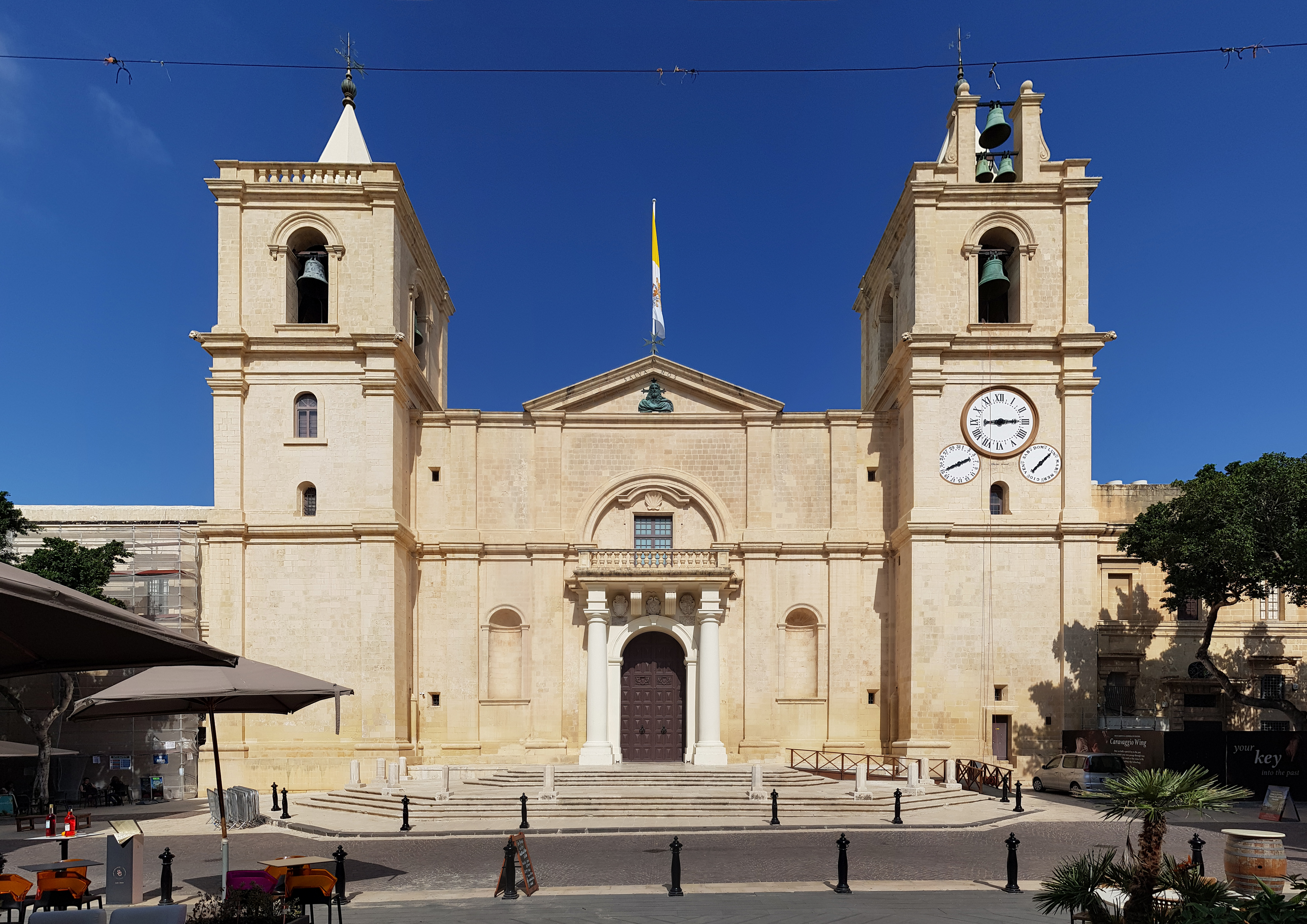
- Façade of St John's Co-Cathedral in 2020
- St John's Co-Cathedral
- 35°53′52″N 14°30′46″E
- Location: Valletta
- Country: Malta
- Denomination: Catholic Church
- Sui iuris church: Latin Church
- Website: www.stjohnscocathedral.com

History
- Former name(s): Conventual Church of St. John; The Major Conventual and Parochial Church of the Jerosolymitan Order dedicated to St John the Baptist
- Status: Co-cathedral
- Founder: Jean de la Cassière
- Dedication: John the Baptist
- Consecrated: 20 February 1578

Architecture
- Heritage designation: Grade 1
- Designated: 2008
- Architect: Girolamo Cassar
- Architectural type: Church
- Style: Mannerist (exterior); Baroque (interior)
- Groundbreaking: 1572
- Completed: 1577

Specifications
- Length: 65 metres (213 ft)
- Width: 40 metres (130 ft)
- Materials: Limestone

Administration
- Archdiocese: Archdiocese of Malta

Clergy
- Archbishop: Charles Scicluna
- Rector: Paul Carmel Vella

St John's Co-Cathedral (Maltese: Kon-Katidral ta' San Ġwann) is a Catholic co-cathedral in Valletta, Malta, dedicated to Saint John the Baptist. It was built by the Order of St. John between 1573 and 1578, having been commissioned by Grand Master Jean de la Cassière as the Conventual Church of Saint John (Maltese: Knisja Konventwali ta' San Ġwann).

The church was designed by the Maltese architect Girolamo Cassar, who designed several of the more prominent buildings in Valletta. In the 17th century, its interior was redecorated in the Baroque style by Mattia Preti and other artists. The interior of the church is considered to be one of the finest examples of high Baroque architecture in Europe.

== History ==
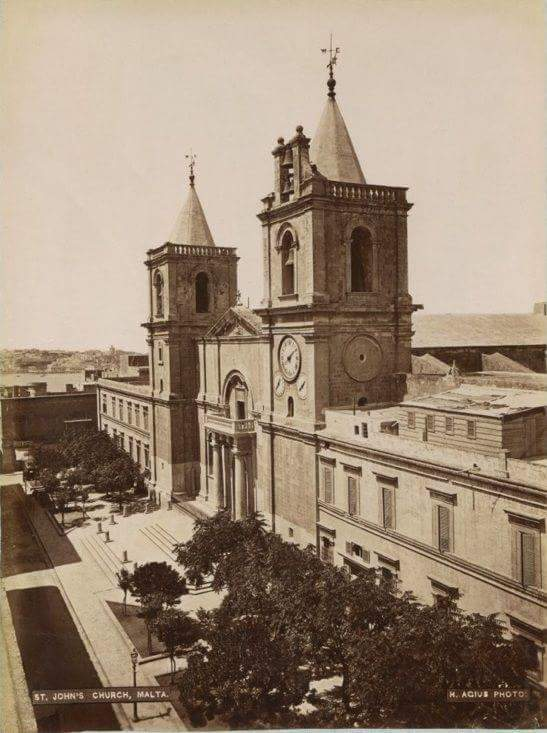
The co-cathedral in the 1870s

Following the Great Siege of 1565, St. John's Co-Cathedral was commissioned in 1572 by Jean de la Cassière, Grand Master of the Order of St. John. It was initially named, in the Italian common language of the time, as Chiesa Conventuale di San Giovanni Battista. The church was designed by the Maltese architect Girolamo Cassar, who also designed and oversaw the construction of many important buildings in Valletta. It is held that Cassar went to Rhodes to bring a plan of an already existing church that was by then converted to a mosque, to use it as a model for the present co-cathedral. However, Cassar still took decisions over the final design and made modifications, and thus became the sole architect of the co-cathedral. Once St. John's was completed in 1577, it became the new conventual church of the Order instead of St. Lawrence's Church in the Order's former headquarters Birgu. Construction of the oratory and sacristy began in 1598, during the magistracy of Martin Garzez, and they were completed by Grand Master Alof de Wignacourt in 1604.

For the first century of its existence, the church's interior was modestly decorated. However, in the 1660s, Grand Master Raphael Cotoner ordered the redecoration of the interior so as to rival the churches of Rome. Calabrian artist Mattia Preti was in charge of the embellishment, and effectively completely transformed the interior in the Baroque style. The annexes on the side of the cathedral were added later and feature the coat of arms of Grand Master António Manoel de Vilhena who reigned from 1722 to 1736.

St. John's remained the conventual church of the Order until the latter was expelled from Malta with the French occupation in 1798. Over time, the church grew to equal prominence with the archbishop's cathedral at Mdina. In the 1820s, the Bishop of Malta was allowed to use St John's as an alternative see and it thus formally became a co-cathedral.

In 1831, Sir Walter Scott called the cathedral a "magnificent church, the most striking interior [he had] ever seen." In the mid-19th century, Giuseppe Hyzler, a leader of the Nazarene movement, removed some of the Baroque art of the cathedral, including the ornate altar in the Chapel of the Langue of France.

The cathedral's exterior was slightly damaged by aerial bombardment in 1941, during World War II, barely escaping total destruction. The contents of the cathedral had been transferred elsewhere before the bombardment, so no works of art were lost.

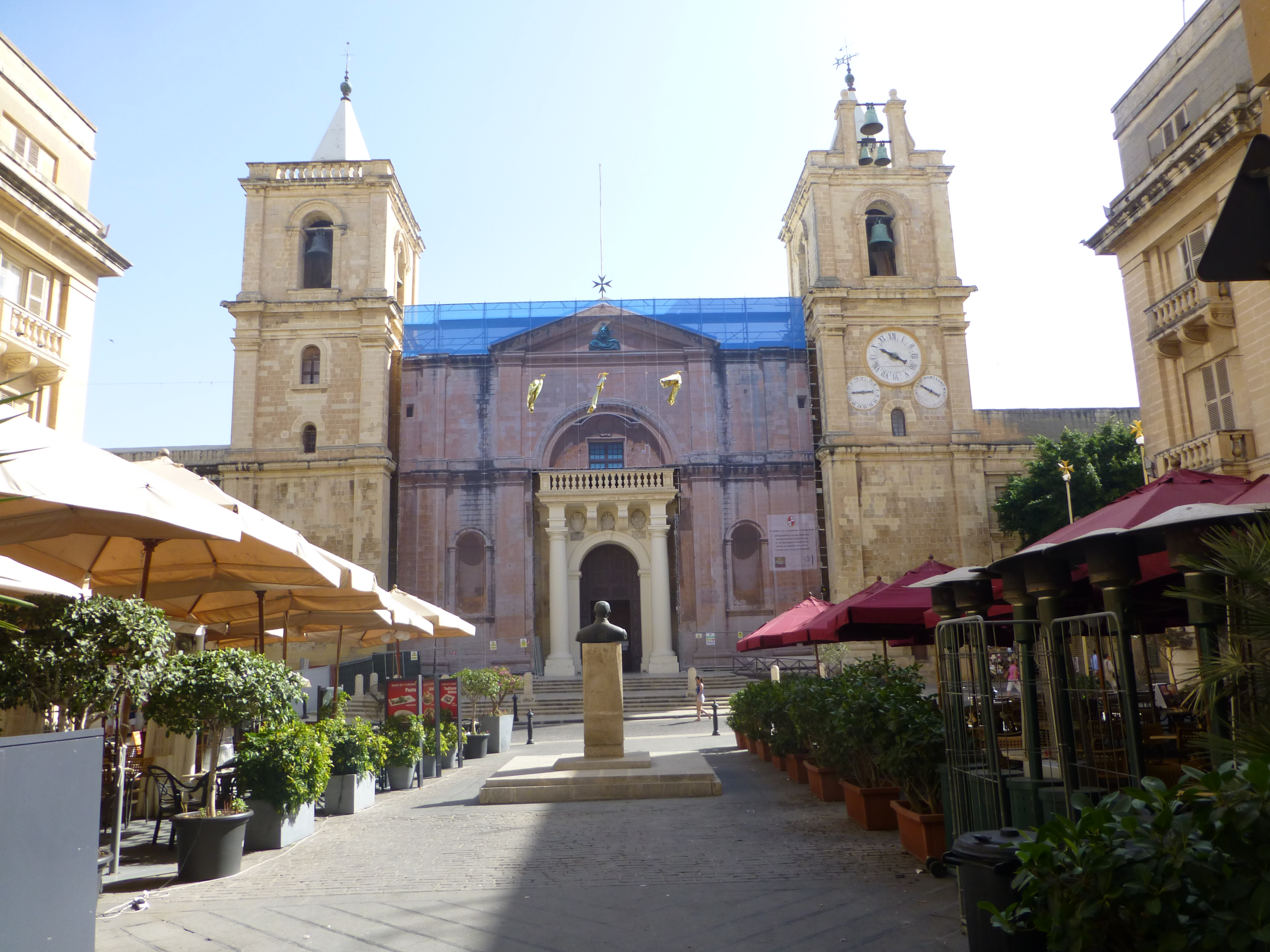
The façade of St. John's Co-Cathedral being restored in 2014

The cathedral was restored between the late 1980s and the early 1990s. In 2001, the St. John's Co-Cathedral Foundation was set up to administer and conserve the cathedral and its museum. The sides of the cathedral were restored between 2008 and 2010, and a complete restoration of the exterior began in July 2014 directed by architect Jean Frendo and eight restorers. Restoration of the central part of the façade was completed in September 2015 and project completion was expected in 2017.

Today, the cathedral is one of the most popular tourist attractions in Malta, and is listed on the National Inventory of the Cultural Property of the Maltese Islands.

== Exterior ==
The cathedral's exterior is built in the Mannerist style typical of its architect Girolamo Cassar. Its façade is rather plain but well-proportioned, being bounded by two large bell towers. The doorway is flanked by Doric columns supporting an open balcony from which the Grand Master used to address the people on important occasions. On the side are also two empty niches. The niches and the columns are a break with the rest of exterior Mannerist architecture.

Overall, the exterior is rather austere and reminiscent of a fortress, reflecting both Cassar's style as a military engineer as well as the Order's mood in the years following the Great Siege of Malta in 1565.

== Interior ==
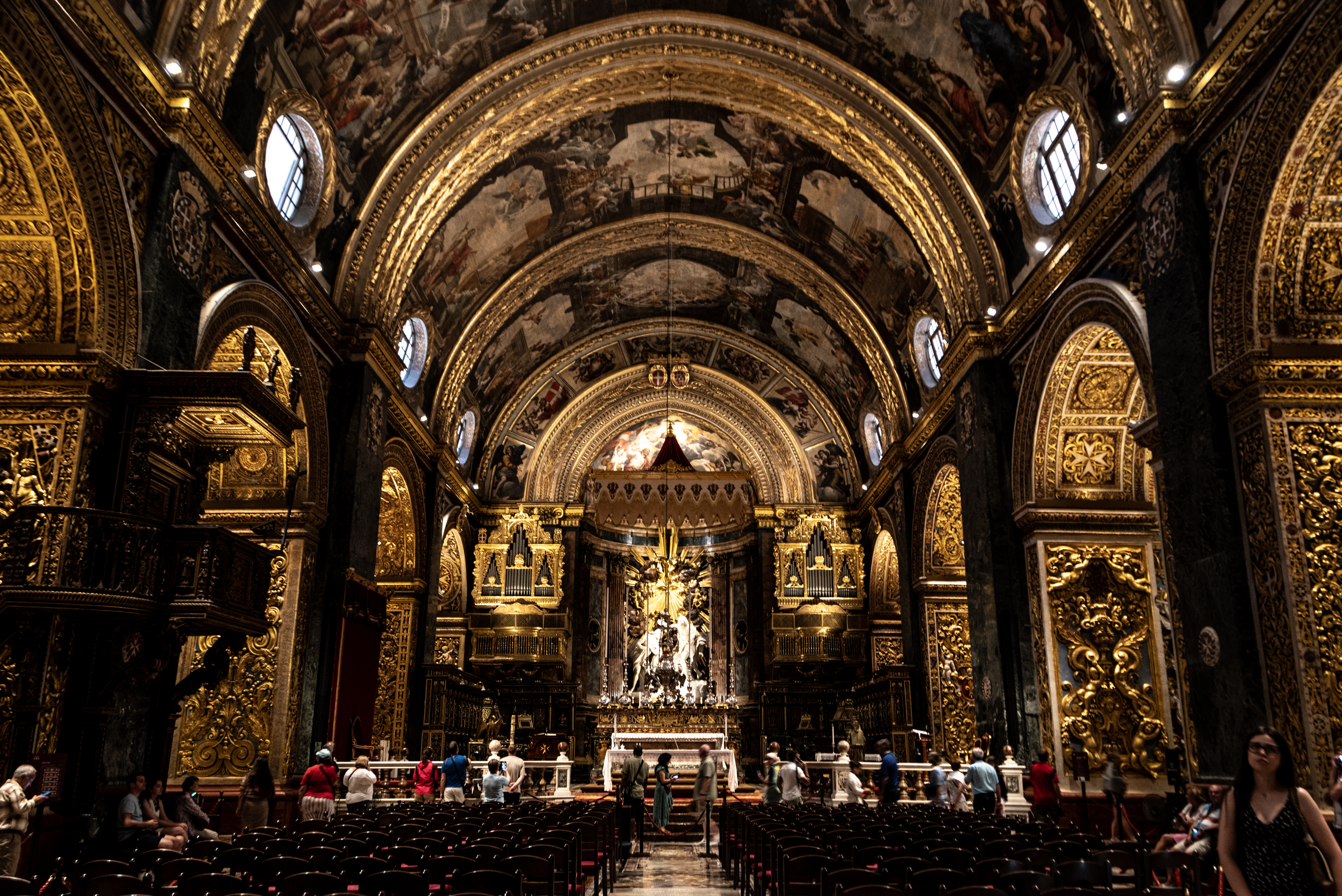
Nave

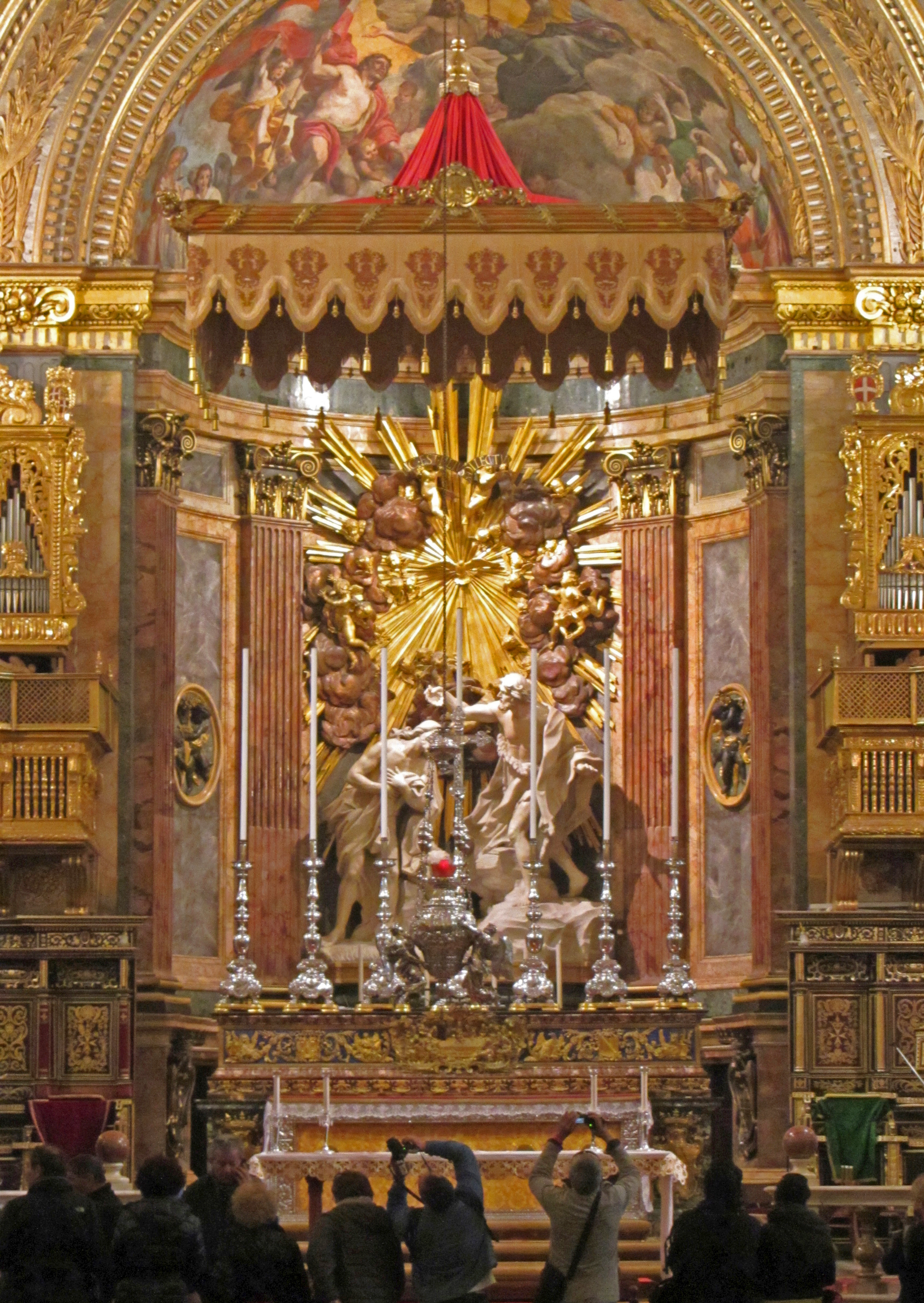
Main altar

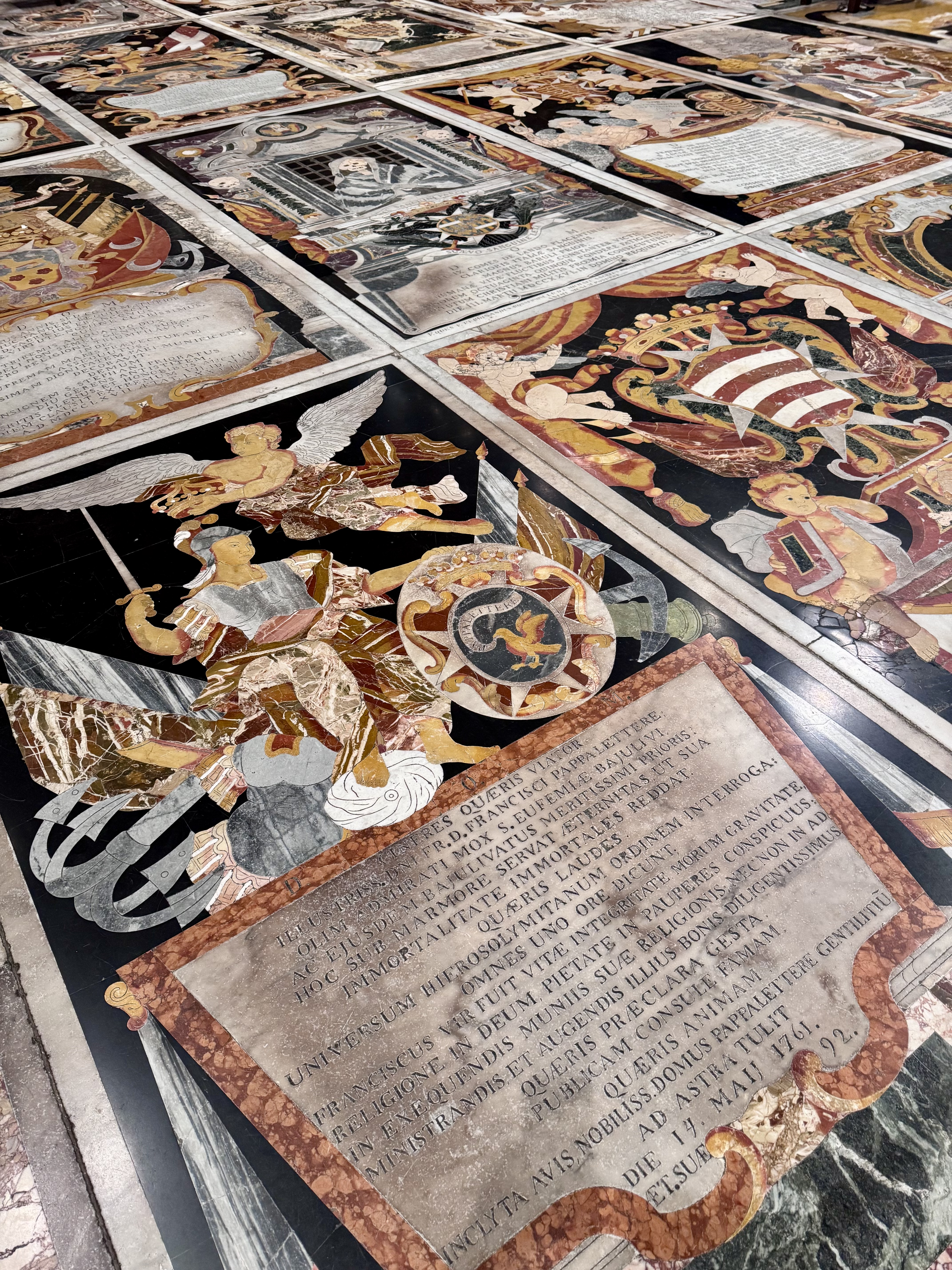
Some of the many marble ledger stones on the floor of the cathedral

The cathedral's interior is extremely ornate, standing in sharp contrast with the façade. The interior was largely decorated by Mattia Preti, the Calabrian artist and knight, at the height of the Baroque period. Preti designed the intricate carved stone walls and painted the vaulted ceiling and side altars with scenes from the life of John the Baptist. The figures painted into the ceiling next to each column initially appear to the viewer as three-dimensional statues, but on closer inspection we see that the artist cleverly created an illusion of three-dimensionality by his use of shadows and placement. Also noteworthy is the fact that the carving was all undertaken in-place (in-situ) rather than being carved independently and then attached to the walls (stucco). The Maltese limestone from which the cathedral is built lends itself particularly well to such intricate carving. The whole marble floor is an entire series of tombs, housing about 400 Knights and officers of the Order. There is also a crypt containing the tombs of Grand Masters like Philippe Villiers de L'Isle-Adam, Claude de la Sengle, Jean Parisot de Valette, and Alof de Wignacourt.

In 1666, a project for the main altar by Malta's greatest sculptor, Melchiorre Cafà, was approved and begun. Cafà intended a large sculpture group in bronze depicting the Baptism of Christ. Following Cafà's tragic death in 1667 in a foundry accident while tending to this work in Rome, the plans were abandoned. Only in 1703, Giuseppe Mazzuoli, Cafà's only pupil, finished a marble group of the Baptism of Christ which might have been influenced by his master's undocumented designs but certainly is strongly dependent on a small baptism group by Alessandro Algardi.

The funerary monument of Grand Master Marc'Antonio Zondadari (died 1722), nephew of Pope Alexander VII, is located close to the main entrance. It was originally meant to be installed in the Chapel of the Langue of Italy, but it was too large so it was placed in the nave.

=== Chapels ===
The cathedral contains nine chapels, one dedicated to Our Lady of Philermos and the rest dedicated to the patron saints of each of the Order's eight langues (or divisions). The following chapels are located on the south side of the church:

- Chapel of Our Lady of Philermos, also known as the Chapel of the Blessed Sacrament – originally contained an icon of Our Lady of Philermos, which had been in the possession of the Order since the Crusades. The icon was taken to Russia by Grand Master Ferdinand von Hompesch zu Bolheim when the Order was expelled from Malta in 1798, and it is now found at the National Museum of Montenegro.
- Chapel of the Langue of Auvergne – dedicated to Saint Sebastian. Its altarpiece depicts the saint's martyrdom, and dates back to the 17th century. The chapel contains the funerary monument of Grand Master Annet de Clermont-Gessant (died 1660).
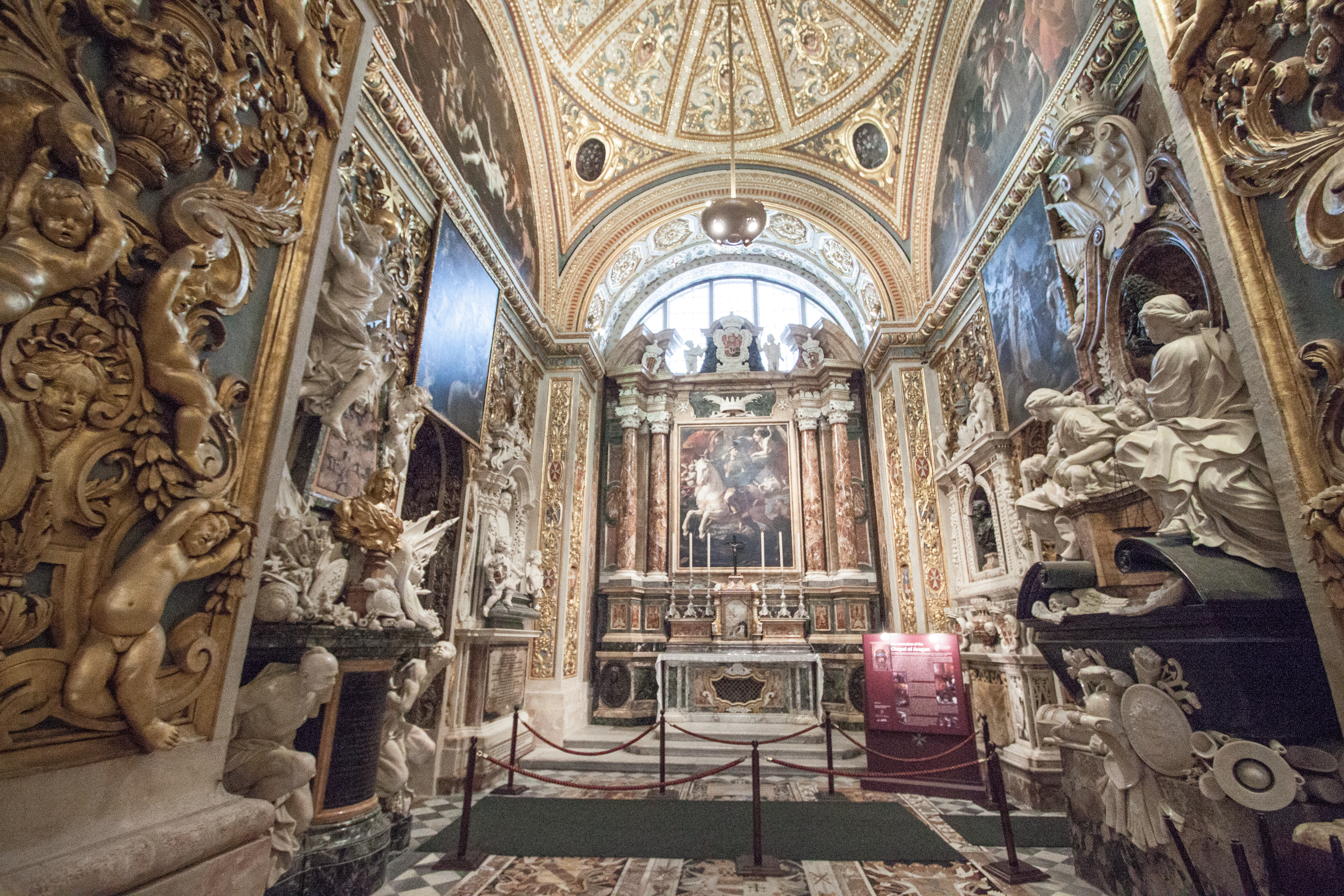
  Chapel of the Langue of Aragon
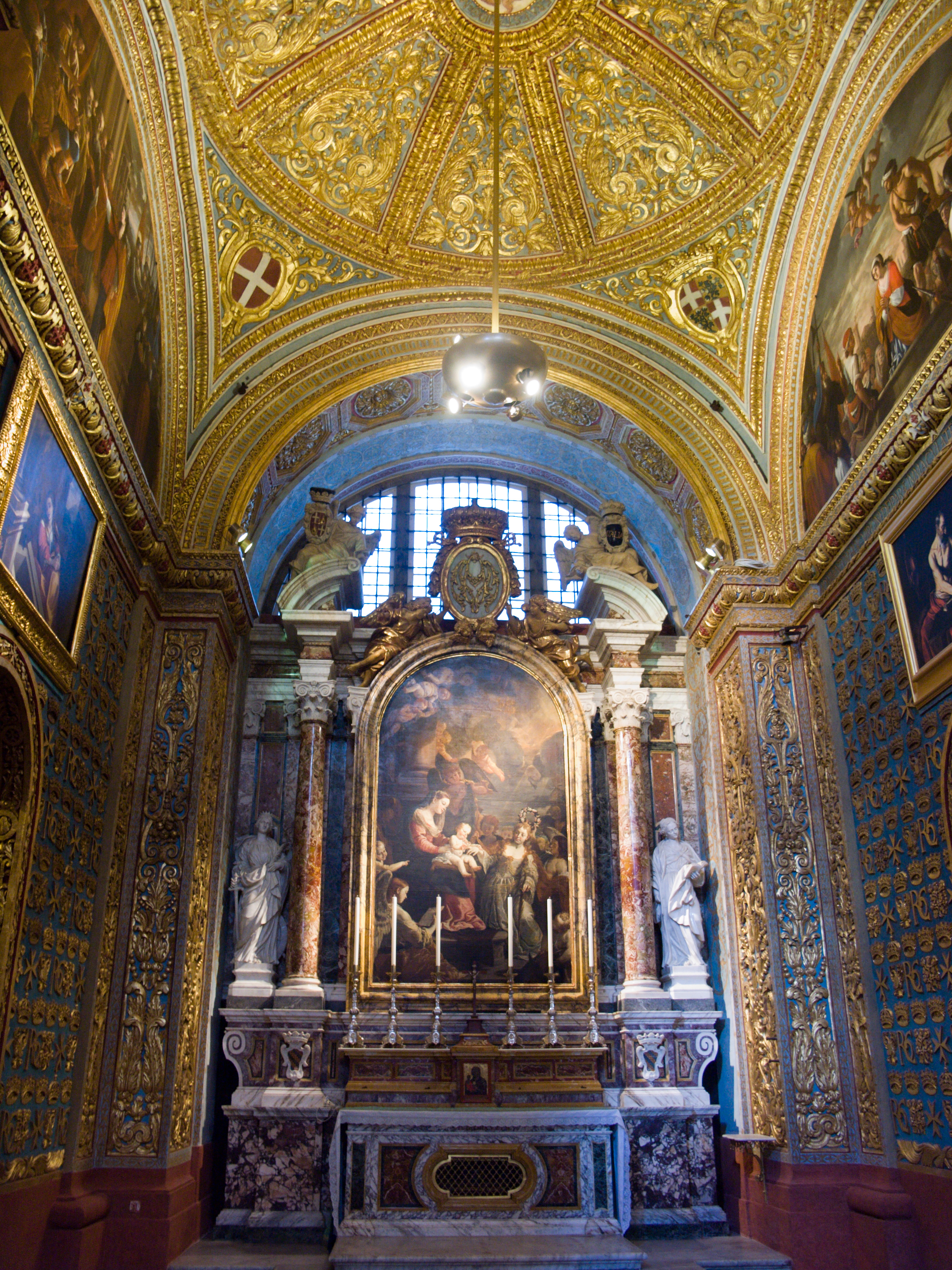
  Chapel of the Langue of Italy
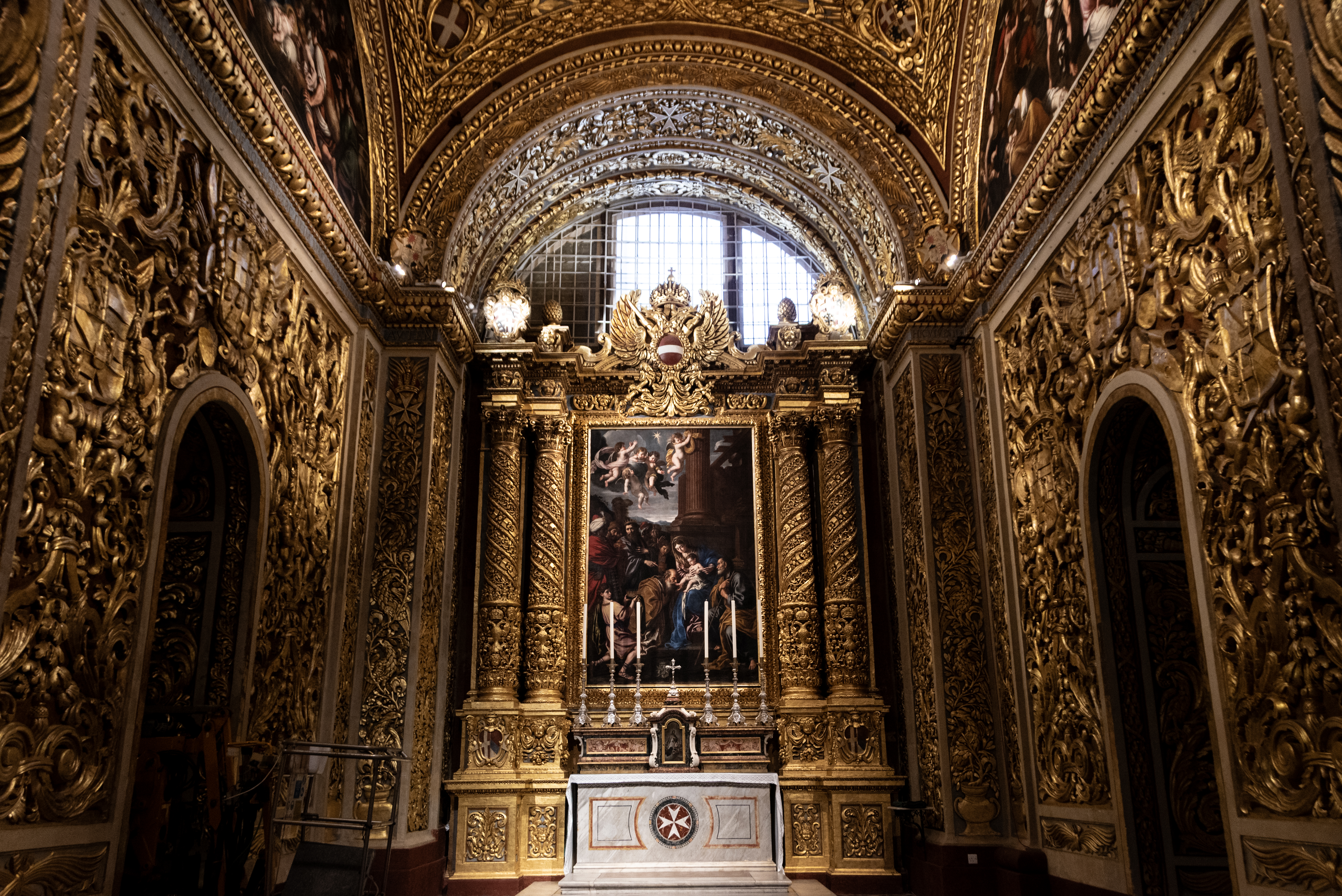
  Chapel of the Langue of Germany
- Chapel of the Langue of Aragon – dedicated to Saint George. Its altarpiece is Saint George on Horseback, and it is considered to be one of Mattia Preti's masterpieces. Grand Masters Martin de Redin (died 1660), Raphael Cotoner (died 1663), Nicolas Cotoner (died 1680) and Ramon Perellos y Roccaful (died 1720) are buried in funerary monuments in this chapel.
- Chapel of the Langue of Castile, Leon and Portugal – dedicated to Saint James. Its altarpiece depicts the saint in an aesthetically pleasing manner, and it is the work of Mattia Preti. Grand Masters António Manoel de Vilhena (died 1736) and Manuel Pinto da Fonseca (died 1773) are buried in ornate marble funerary monuments in this chapel.

On the north side of the church, one finds the following chapels:

- Chapel of the Anglo-Bavarian Langue, also known as the Chapel of Relics – dedicated to Saint Charles Borromeo. Its altarpiece depicts the presentation of the saint to the Virgin Mary, and it is attributed to Beaumont. The chapel originally contained many relics that the Order acquired through the centuries, but these were removed in 1798.
- Chapel of the Langue of Provence – dedicated to Saint Michael the Archangel. Its altarpiece depicts the archangel leading God's armies against Satan, and it also contains marble funerary monuments of Grand Masters Antoine de Paule (died 1636) and Giovanni Paolo Lascaris (died 1657).
- Chapel of the Langue of France – dedicated to the Conversion of Saint Paul. Its altarpiece depicts The Conversion of St Paul on the Way to Damascus, and it is the work of Mattia Preti. The chapel also contains the funerary monuments of Grand Masters Adrien de Wignacourt (died 1697) and Emmanuel de Rohan-Polduc (died 1797), as well as the Marquis de Wignacourt (died 1615) and Louis Charles, Count of Beaujolais (died 1808). Parts of the chapel were redecorated in the late 1830s.
- Chapel of the Langue of Italy – dedicated to the Immaculate Conception and Saint Catherine of Alexandria. Its altarpiece depicts The Mystic Marriage of St Catherine, and it is the work of Mattia Preti. The chapel also contains the funerary monument of Grand Master Gregorio Carafa (died 1690).
- Chapel of the Langue of Germany – dedicated to the Epiphany of Christ. The chapel was originally assigned to the langue of England, but was given to the langue of Germany following the English Reformation. Its altarpiece depicts The Adoration of the Magi by the Maltese painter Stefano Erardi.

=== Notable works of art ===
The Beheading of Saint John the Baptist, 1608. Oil on canvas, 361 x 520 cm. Oratory of the co-cathedral

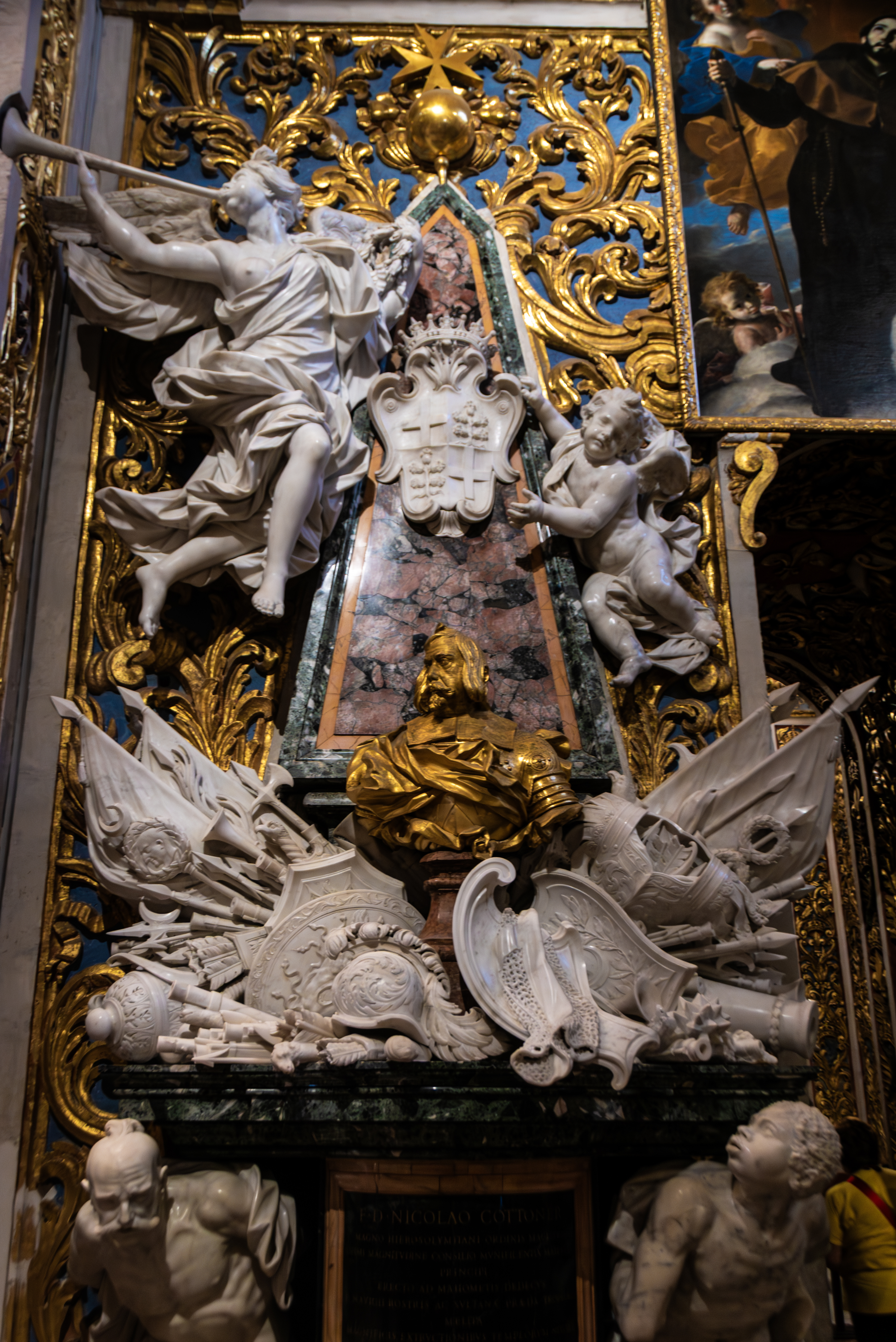
Monument to Grand Master Nicolas Cotoner by Domenico Guidi, at the Chapel of Aragon.

The painting depicting The Beheading of Saint John the Baptist (1608) by Caravaggio (1571–1610) is the most famous work in the church. Considered one of Caravaggio's masterpieces, the largest canvas he painted and the only painting signed by the painter, the canvas is displayed in the Oratory for which it was painted. Restored in the late 1990s in Florence, this painting is one of Caravaggio's most impressive uses of the chiaroscuro style for which he is most famous with a circle of light illuminating the scene of St John's beheading at the request of Salome. The oratory also houses Caravaggio's Saint Jerome Writing (1607–1608).

Another impressive feature of the church is the collection of marble tombstones in the nave in which were buried important knights. The more important knights were placed closer to the front of the church. These tombstones, richly decorated with in-laid marble and with the coats of arms of the knight buried below as well as images relevant to that knight, often telling a story of triumph in battle, form a rich visual display in the church.

Adjoining to the church is the St John's Co-Cathedral Museum containing art objects. Among the contents of the museum there are the Flemish Tapestries designed by Peter Paul Rubens, which were donated by Grand Master Ramon Perellos y Roccaful, paintings of Grand Masters Jean de la Cassière, Nicolas Cotoner and Manuel Pinto da Fonseca, and paintings which were formerly in the side chapels such as St. George killing the Dragon by Francesco Potenzano.

== Visiting ==
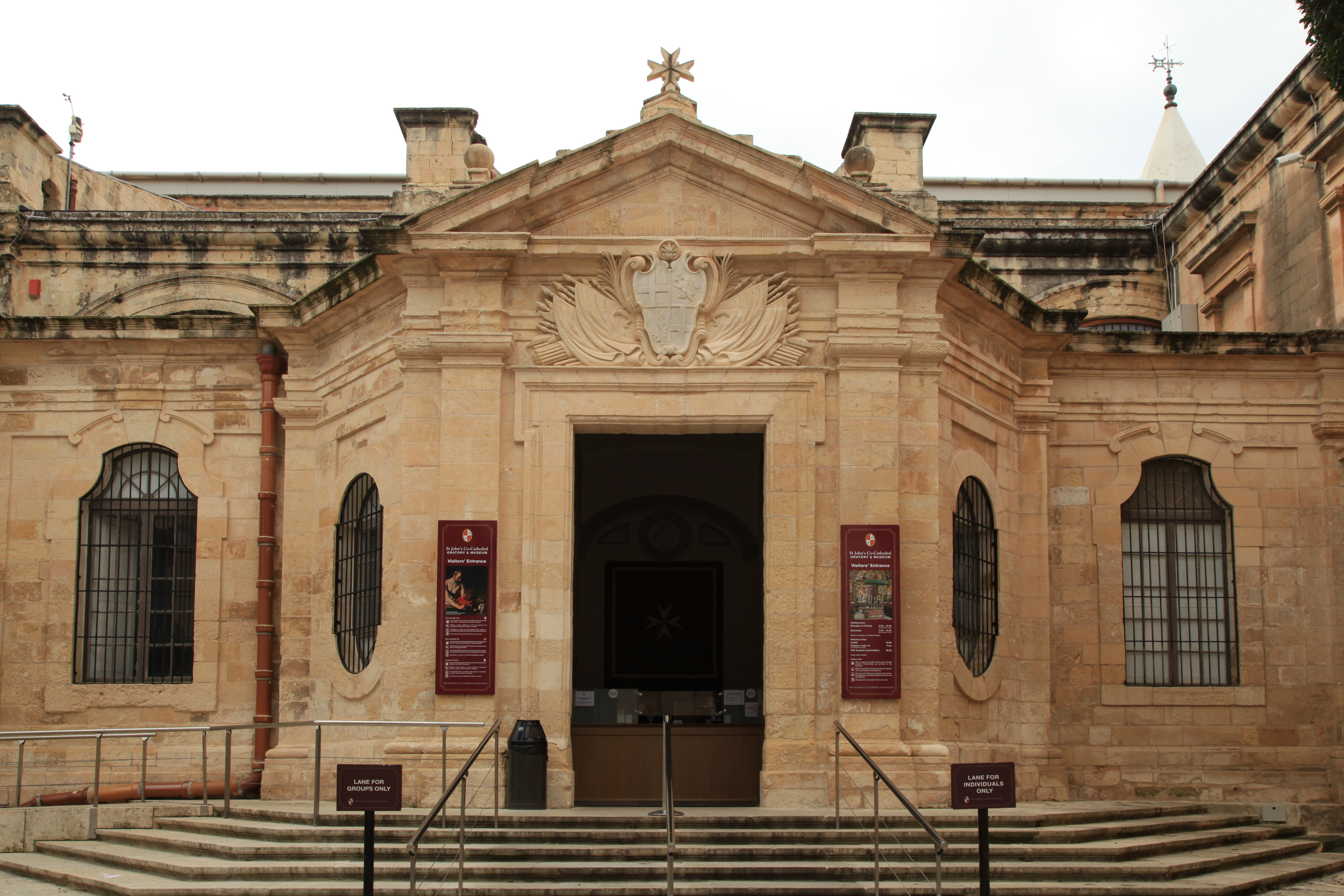
Visitors' entrance to the co-cathedral

St. John's Co-Cathedral is located in the centre of Valletta, and it is a short walk away from the bus terminus near City Gate. The main entrance of the cathedral is in St John's Square, but the visitors' entrance is from Great Siege Square in Republic Street, facing the Law Courts.

Fees are charged for visitors, but those visiting the cathedral for Mass only do not have to pay the entrance fee.

== Gallery ==
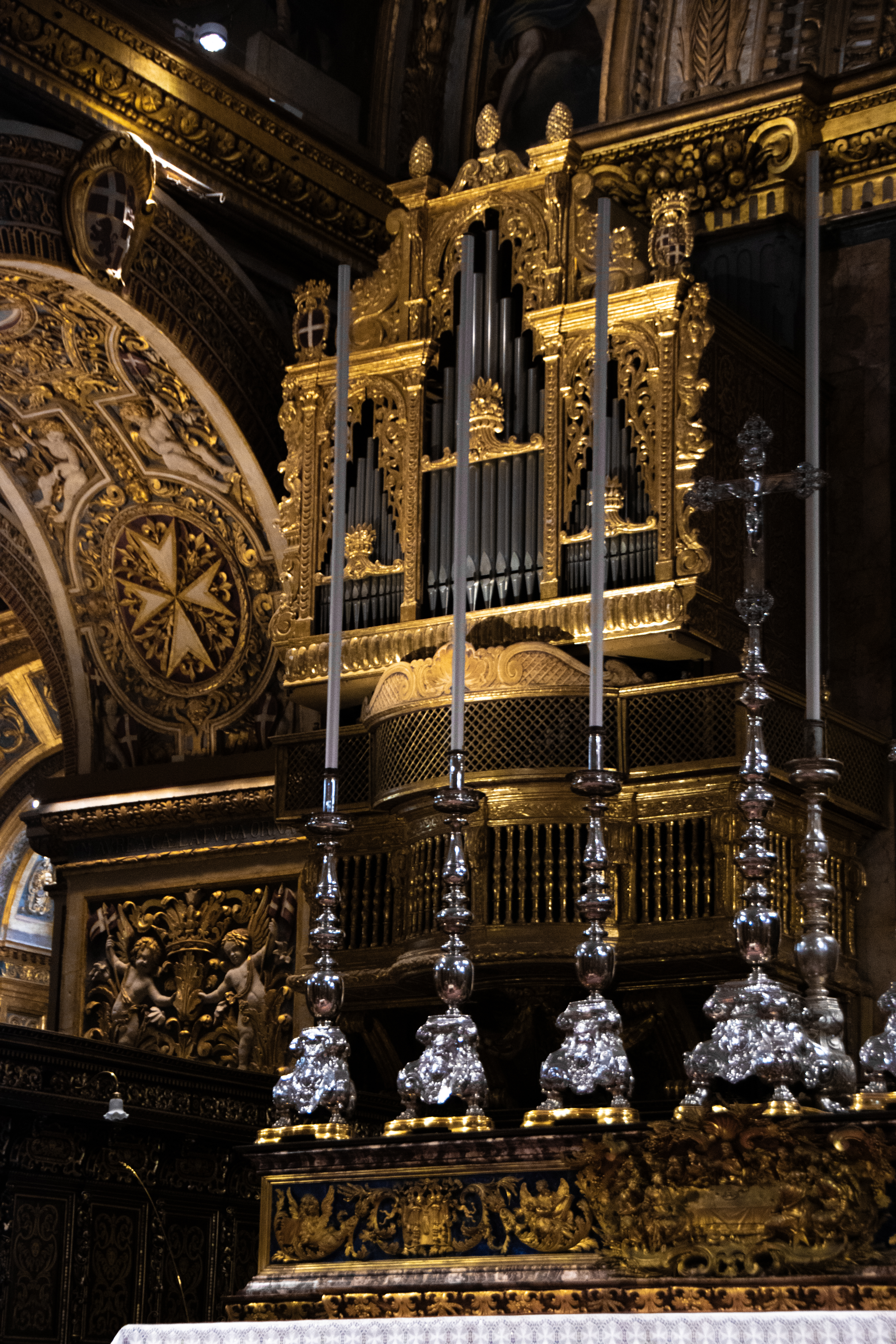
The pipe organ of the co-cathedral

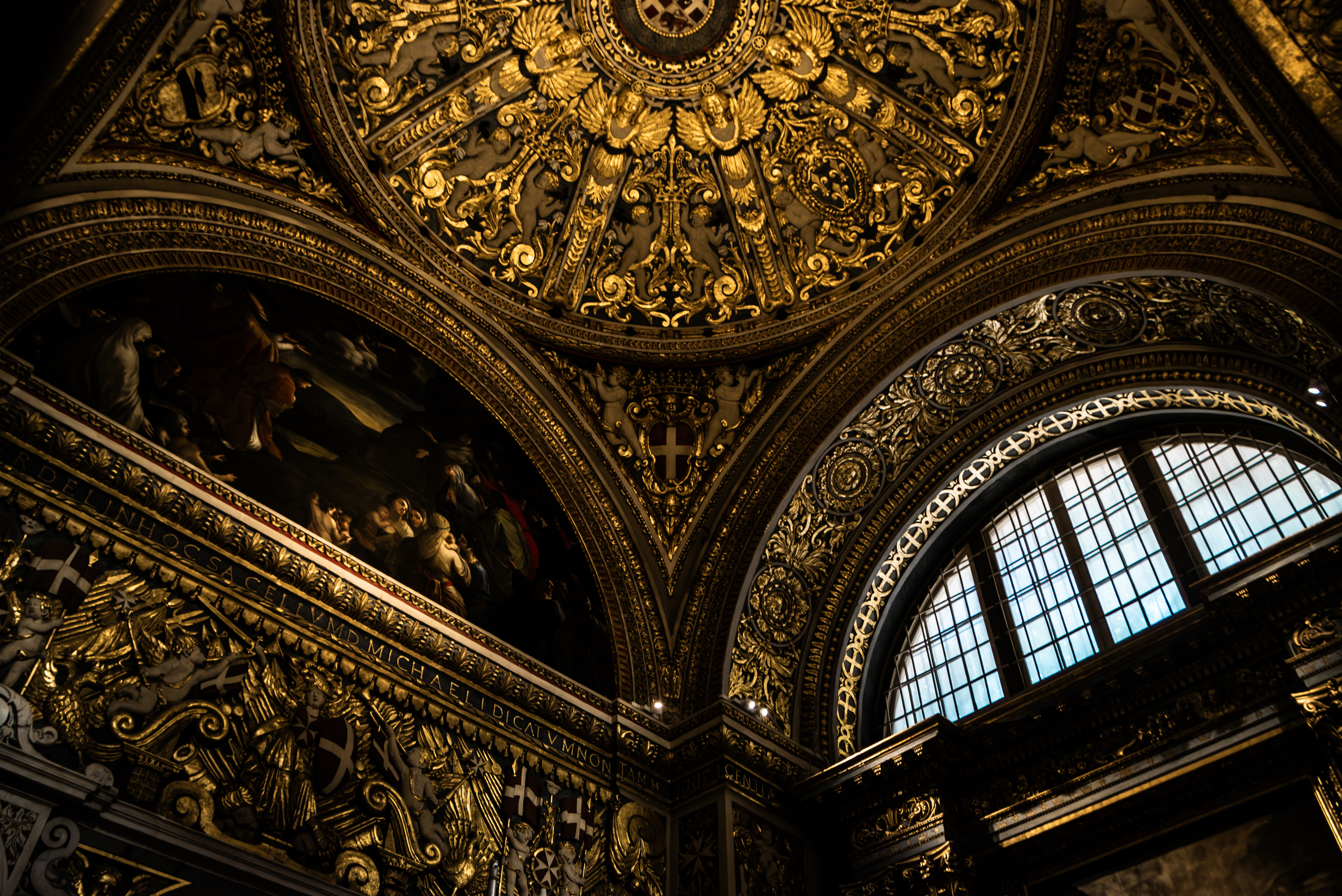
Dome and semicircular windows inside the Chapel of the Langue of Provence

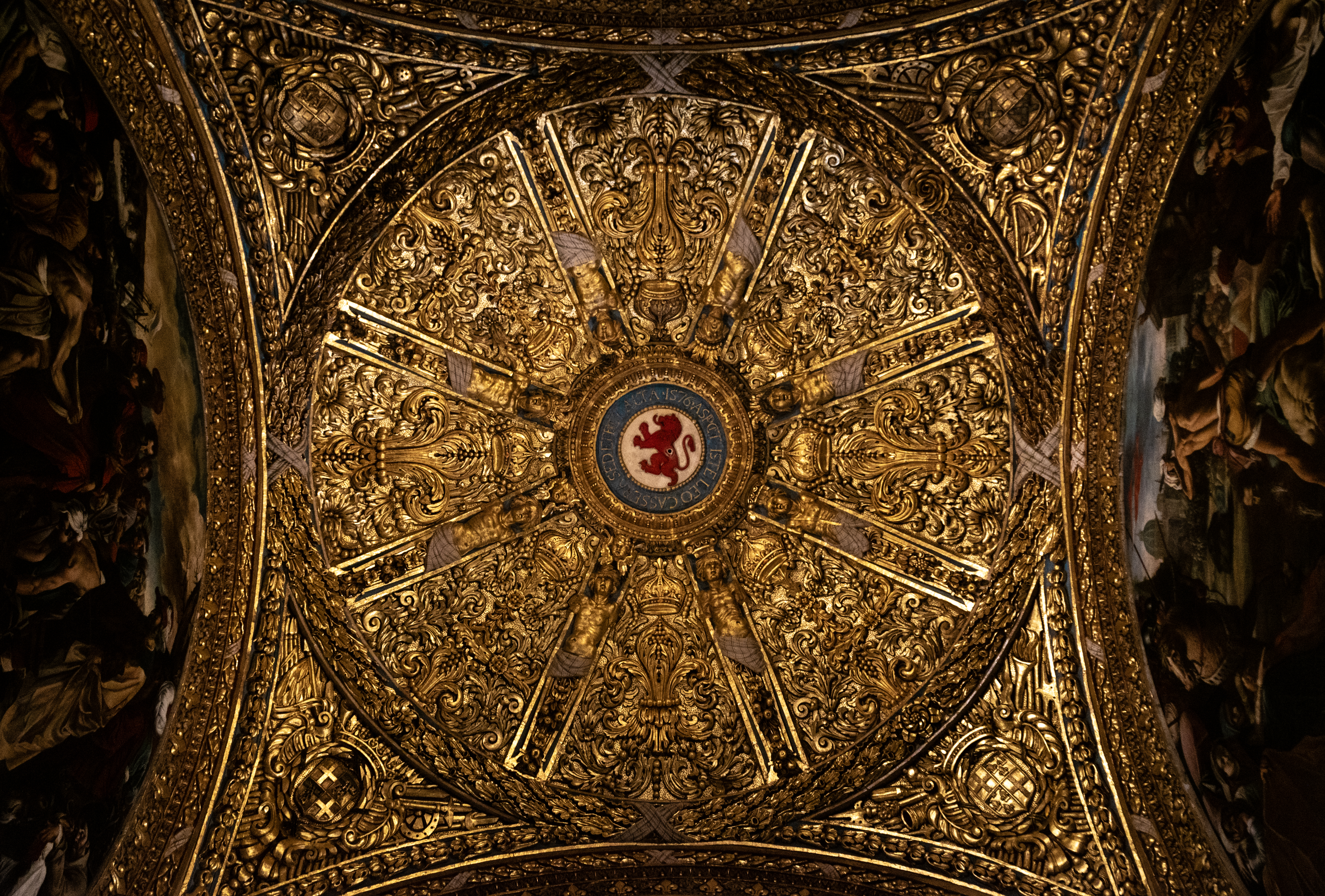
Dome of the Chapel of the Langue of France

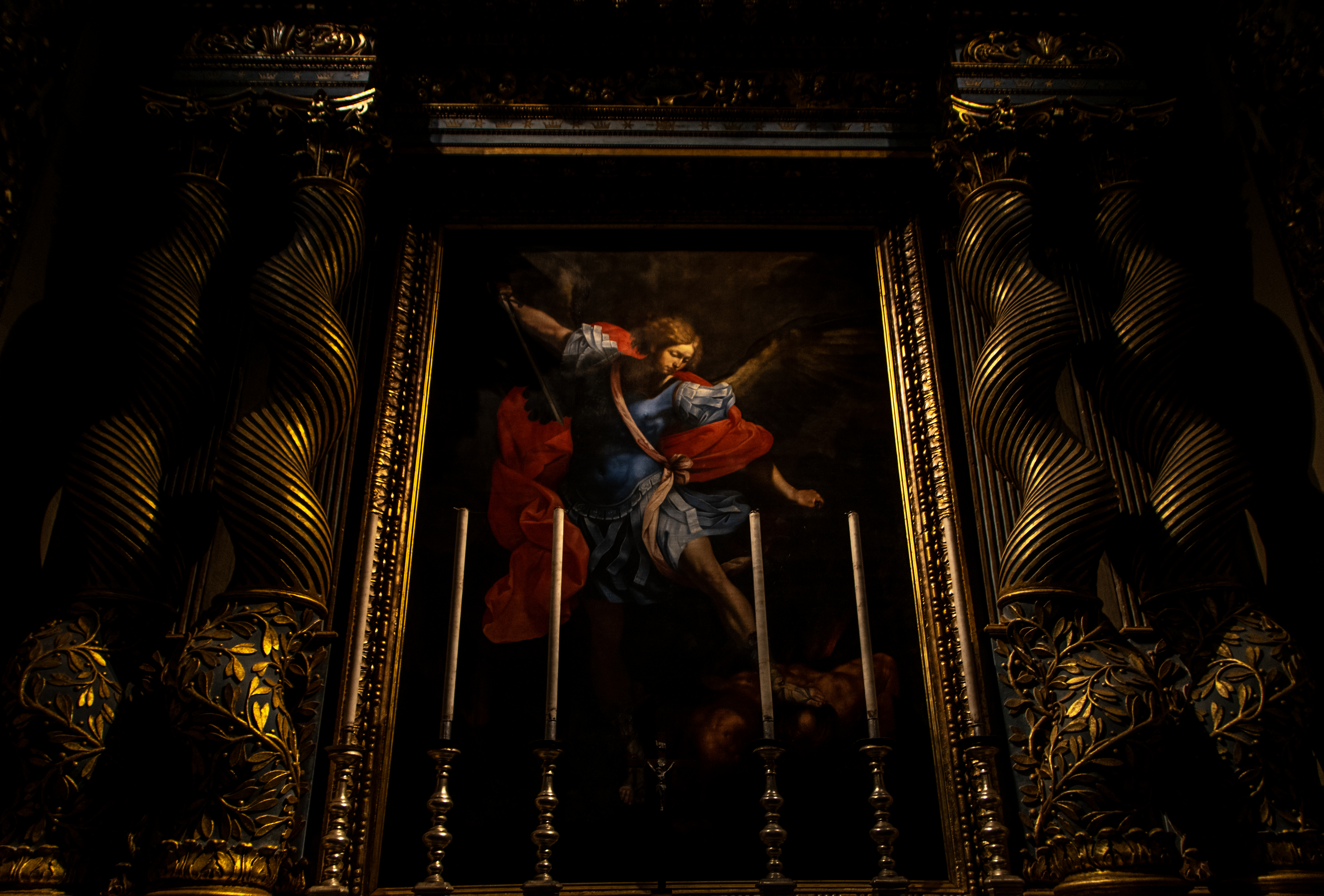
Painting of St. Michael Archangel inside the Chapel of the Langue of Provence, believed to be painted by Mattia Preti

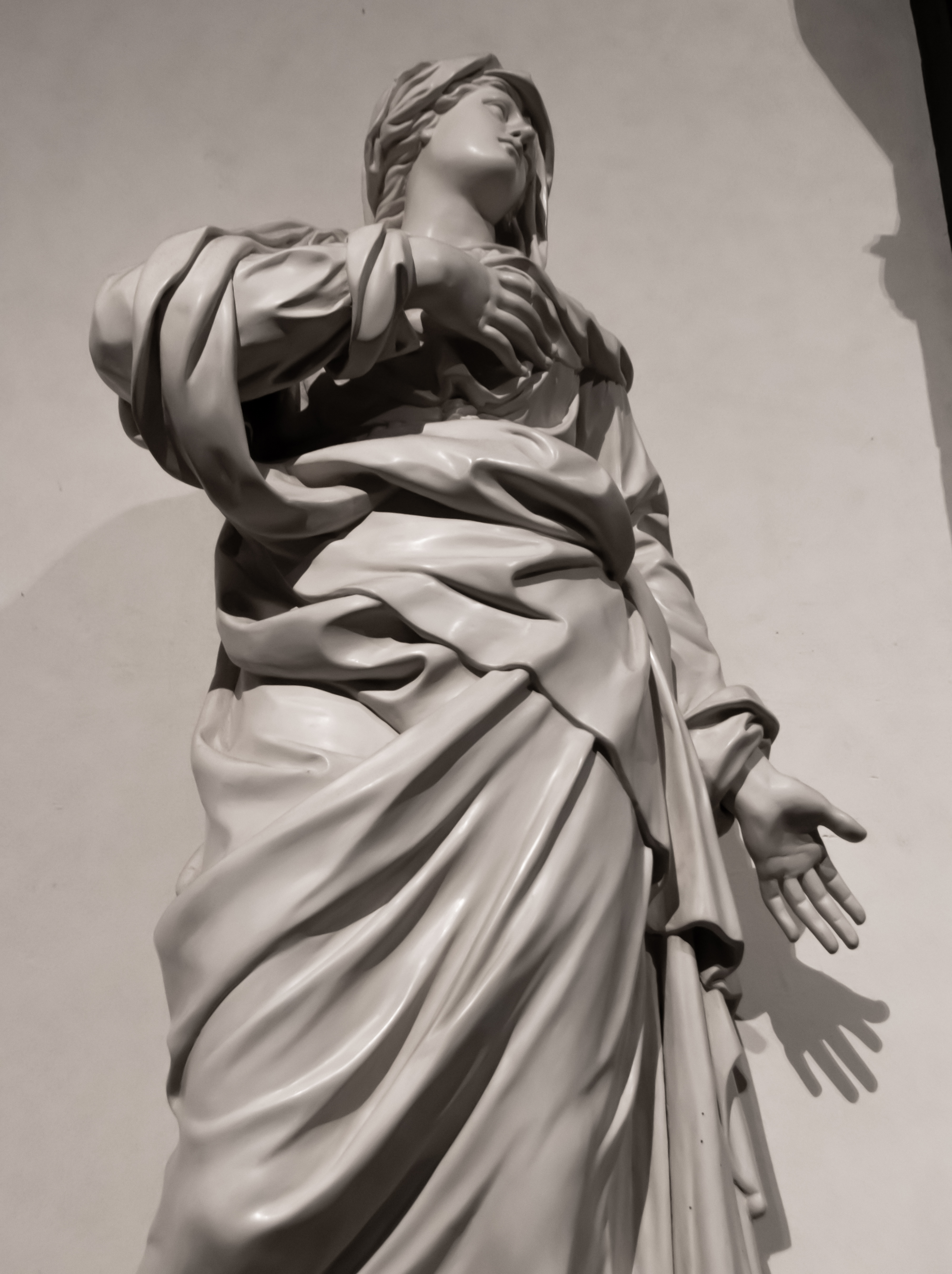
Statue of the Virgin Mary, one of three statues in the "Crucifixion Group," believed to be sculpted by Alessandro Algardi

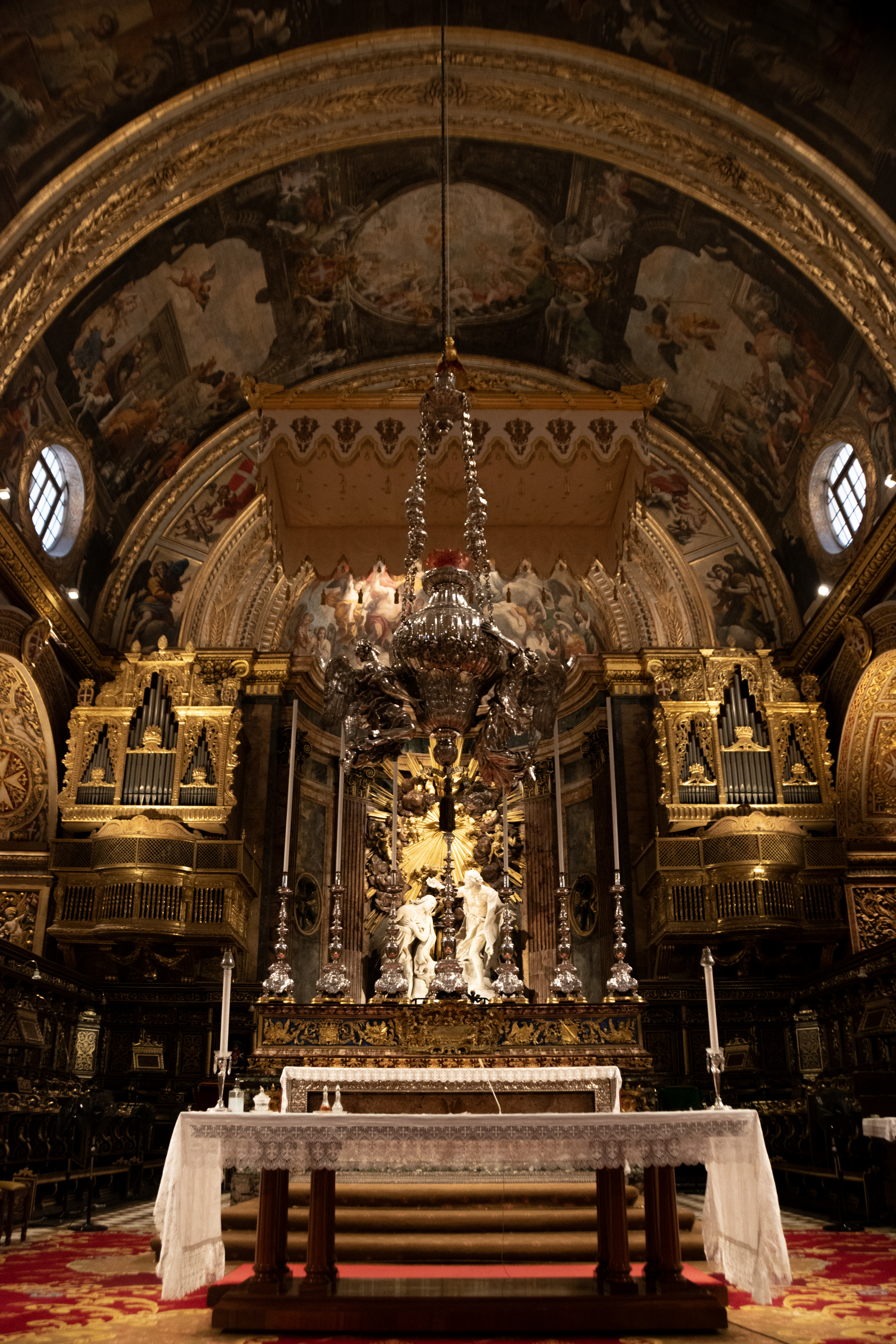
Chancel of the Cathedral

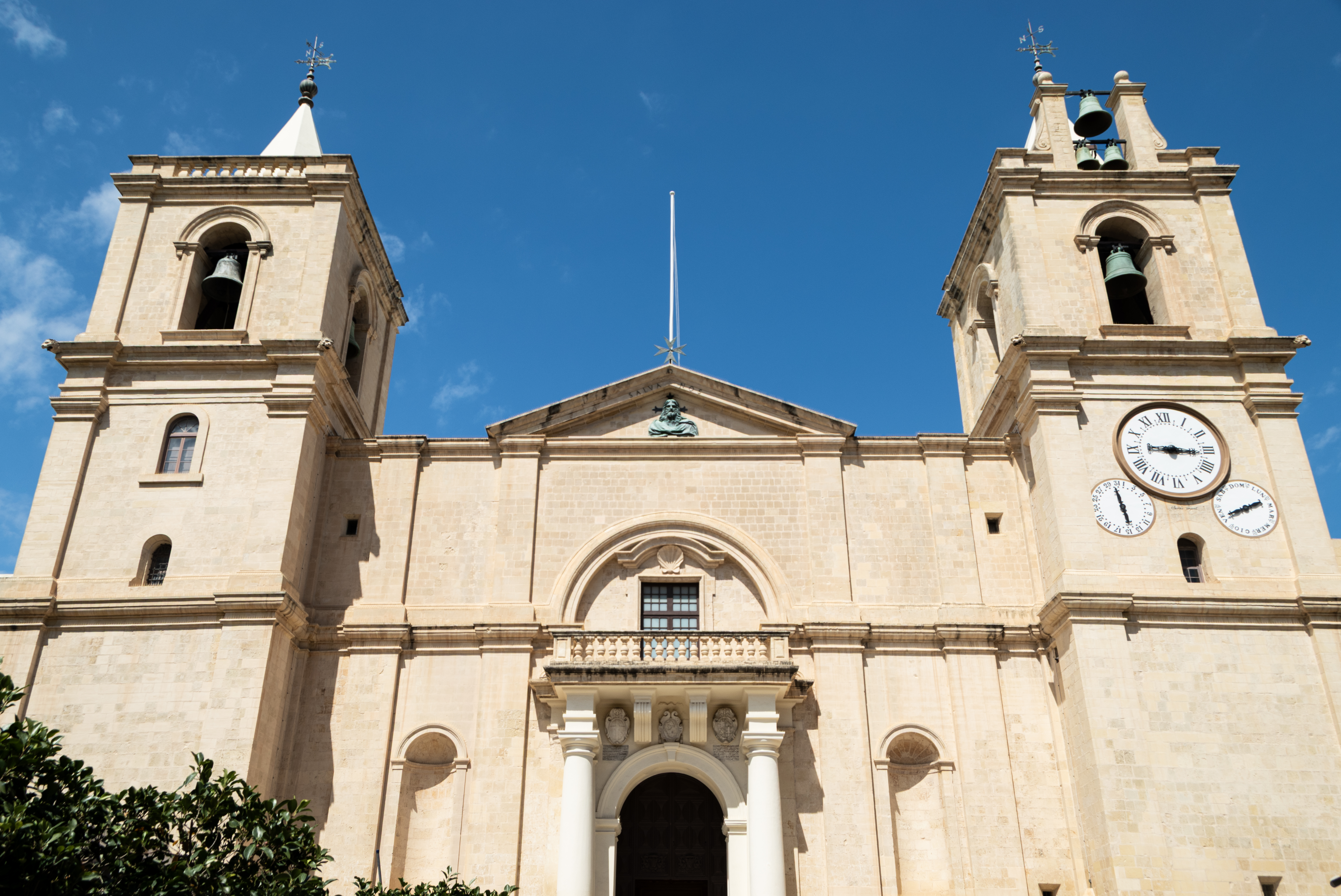
Façade from ground

== See also ==
- Culture of Malta
- History of Malta – Maltese history
- List of churches in Malta
- List of works by James Pradier
- Religion in Malta

== Bibliography ==
- de Giorgio, Cynthia (2007). St John's Co-Cathedral – Valletta. Santa Venera: Heritage Books (subsidiary of Midsea Books Ltd). ISBN 9789993271710.
- Sante Guido, Giuseppe Mantella, "Mattia Preti e la volta della Chiesa Conventuale di San Giovanni Battista a La Valletta: documenti e testimonianze 1661-2011 per il 350º anniversario dell'inizio lavori" in I BENI CULTURALI, v. XIX - 3, n. 3 maggio-giugno 2011 (2011), p. 7-28.
- Sante Guido, Giuseppe Mantella, STORIE DI RESTAURI NELLA CHIESA CONVENTUALE DI SAN GIOVANNI A LA VALLETTA. La cappella di santa Caterina della Lingua d'Italia e le committenze del gran maestro Gregorio Carafa, Malta, MidseaBooks, 2008, 494 p. - ISBN 978-99932-7-202-1.
- Sante Guido, Giuseppe Mantella, "Restauri e riscoperte di scultura del barocco romana a Malta. Capolavori per l'Ordine dei cavalieri di san Giovanni.", Malta, Midsea Books LTD, 2005, 144 p. - ISBN 99932-7-046-6.
- Sante Guido, Giuseppe Mantella, "Il restauro del Reliquiario del Braccio di San Giovanni Battista nella Co-Cattedrale di La Valletta" in BOLLETTINO ICR, n.s., v. 2003 - 6–7, n. 6-7 gennaio-dicembre 2003 (2003), p. 33-49.
