= Rafael Cotoner =

Grand Master of the Knights Hospitaller

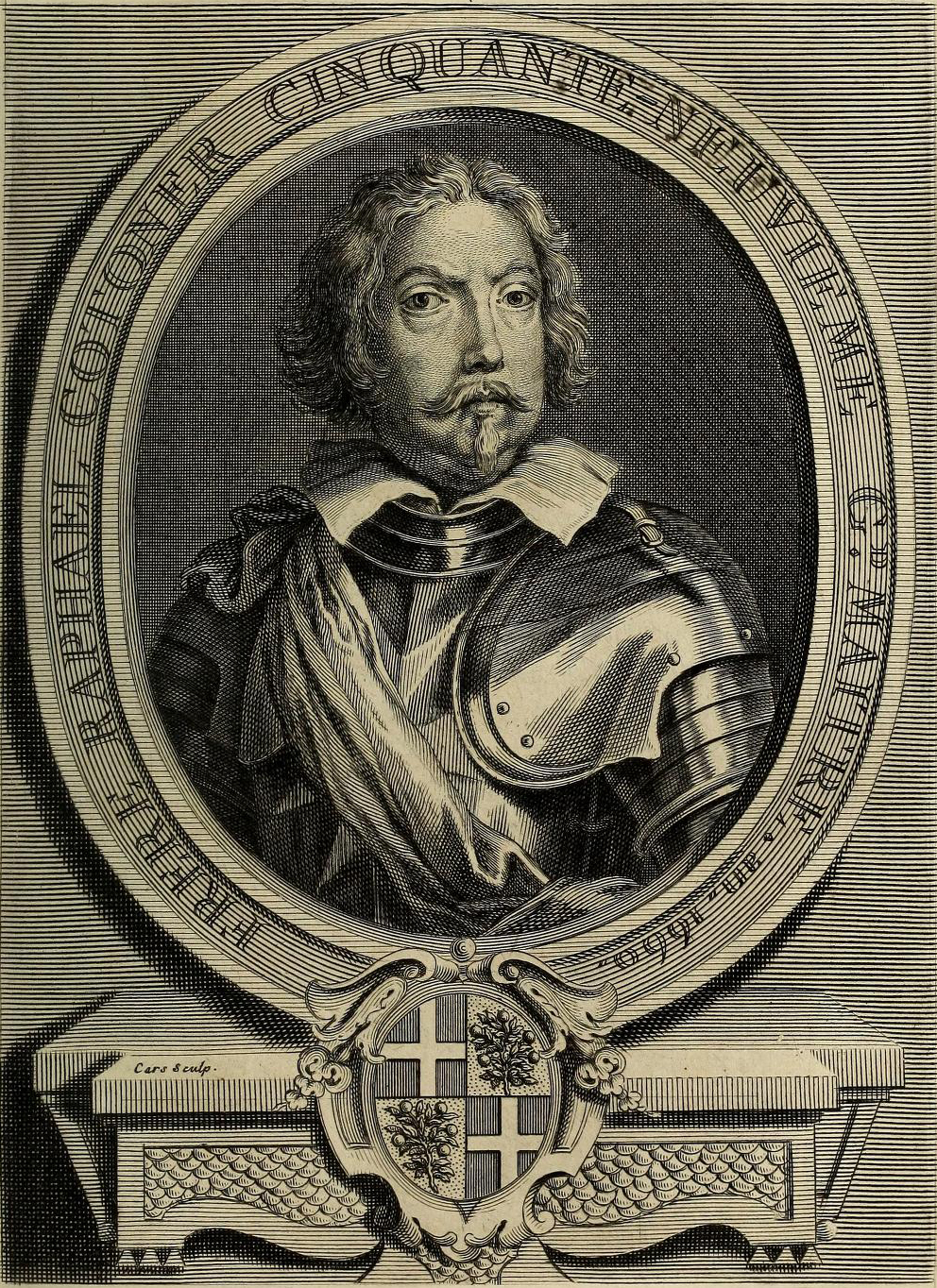

Grand Master of the Order of Saint John
- In office 5 June 1660 – 20 October 1663
- Monarch: King Philip III
- Preceded by: Annet de Clermont-Gessant
- Succeeded by: Nicolas Cotoner

Personal details
- Born: 1601 Mallorca, Spain
- Died: 20 October 1663 (aged 61–62) Valletta, Malta
- Resting place: St. John's Co-Cathedral
- Education: House of Cotoner

Military service
- Allegiance: (Sovereign Military Order of Malta) Order of Saint John

Rafael Cotoner y de Oleza (Maltese: Raphael Cotoner; 1601 – 20 October 1663) was a Spanish knight of Aragon who served as 60th Grand Master of the Knights Hospitaller or, as it is already known by that time, the Order of Malta, from 5 June 1660 to his death on 20 October 1663 following the brief reign of Annet de Clermont-Gessant. After his death, he was succeeded as Grand Master by his younger brother, Nicolas Cotoner.

During Raphael Cotoner's reign, the Order of Malta sent troops to Candia, besieged by the Ottomans.

== Reign as Grand Master ==
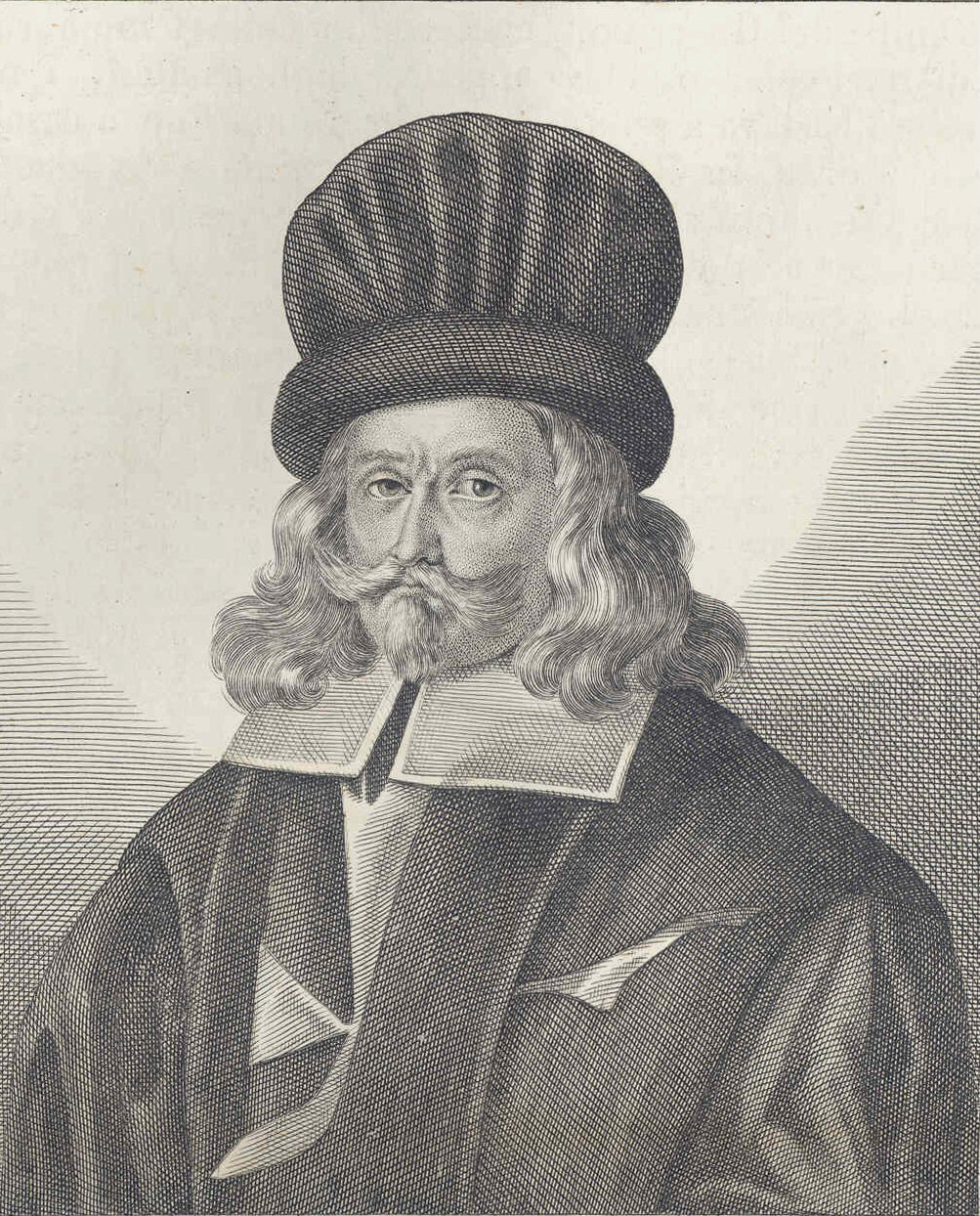
Mattia Preti started work in St. John's Co-Cathedral during Raphael's reign.

During his 3-year reign, the Order of Malta sent reinforcements to support Venetians besieged by the Ottomans in Candia (Candia eventually fell after a siege lasting more than two decades in September 1669, almost 6 years after Cotoner's death when his brother Nicolas was Grand Master). To show their gratitude and appreciation, the Republic of Venice passed a decree allowing members of the Order to appear armed within the Republic's dominions, something which had never been granted to the Republic's subjects themselves.

It was during Raphael's tenure as Grand Master that the Italian Baroque artist Mattia Preti started work in Valletta's St. John's Co-Cathedral. He went on to decorate the cathedral's interior with paintings of John the Baptist.

Preceded by Annet de Clermont-Gessant	Grand Master of the Knights Hospitaller; 5 June 1660–20 October 1663	Succeeded by Nicolas Cotoner
