= Nicolás Cotoner =

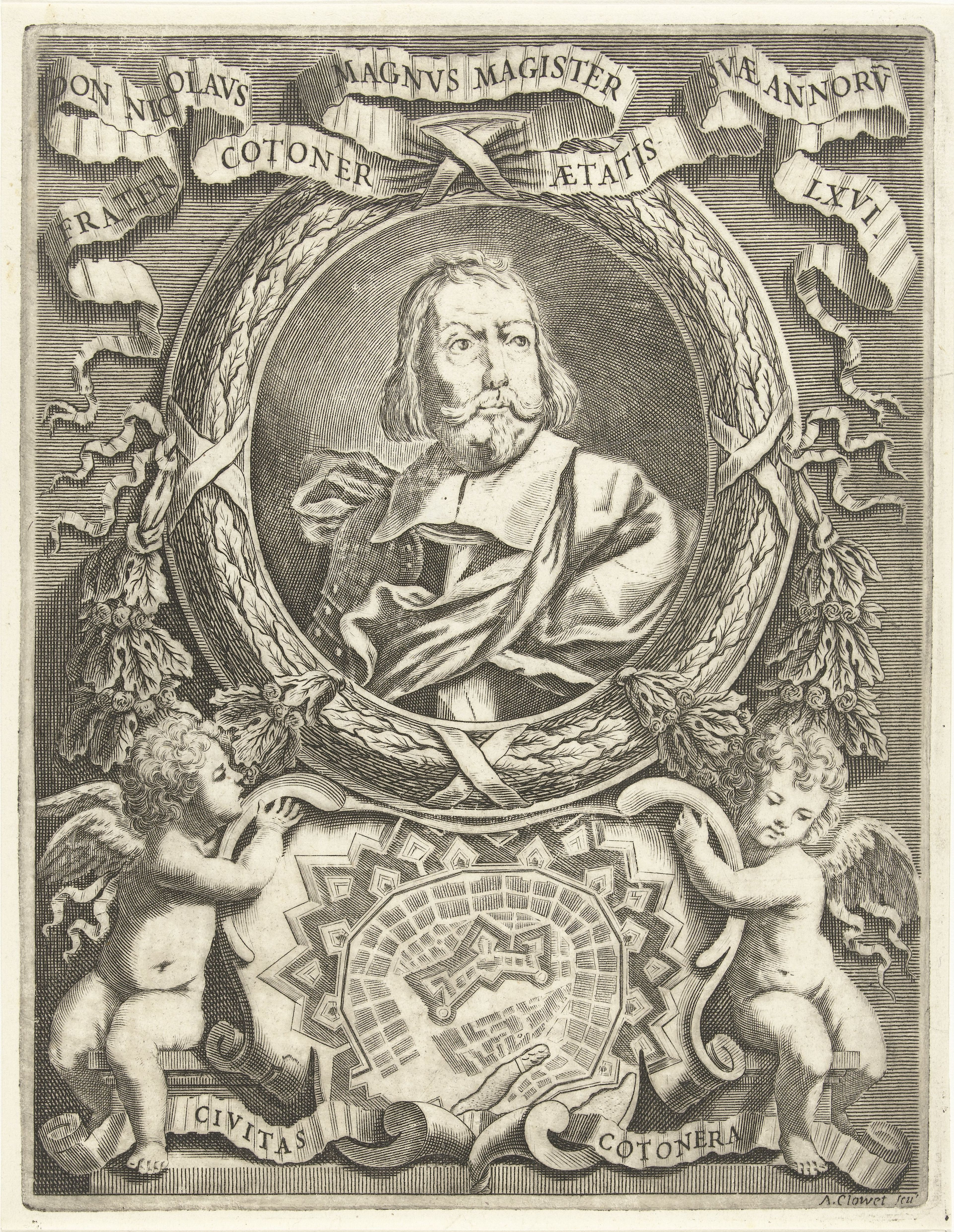

Grand Master of the Order of Saint John
- In office 23 October 1663 – 29 April 1680
- Monarchs: King Philip III; King Charles II
- Preceded by: Raphael Cotoner
- Succeeded by: Gregorio Carafa

Personal details
- Born: 1608 Mallorca, Spain
- Died: 29 April 1680 (aged 71–72) Malta
- Resting place: St. John's Co-Cathedral
- Education: House of Cotoner

Military service
- Allegiance: (Sovereign Military Order of Malta) Order of Saint John

Fra' Nicolás Cotoner y de Oleza (Catalan: Nicolau Cotoner i d'Olesa; 1608, Mallorca – 29 April 1680, Malta) was a knight of Crown of Aragon who served as the 61st Prince and Grand Master of the Order of Malta, between 1663 and 1680. He was the son of Marc Antoni Cotoner i de Santmartí and a younger brother of the previous Grandmaster, Rafael Cotoner.

In 1669, after the fall of Candia, Nicolas Cotoner improved the fortifications of Malta due to fears of an Ottoman attack. He funded the construction of the Cottonera Lines, which were named in his honour. The lines could accommodate up to 40,000 people in case of an invasion. Cotoner's reign also saw the construction of Fort Ricasoli and various modifications to the Floriana Lines.

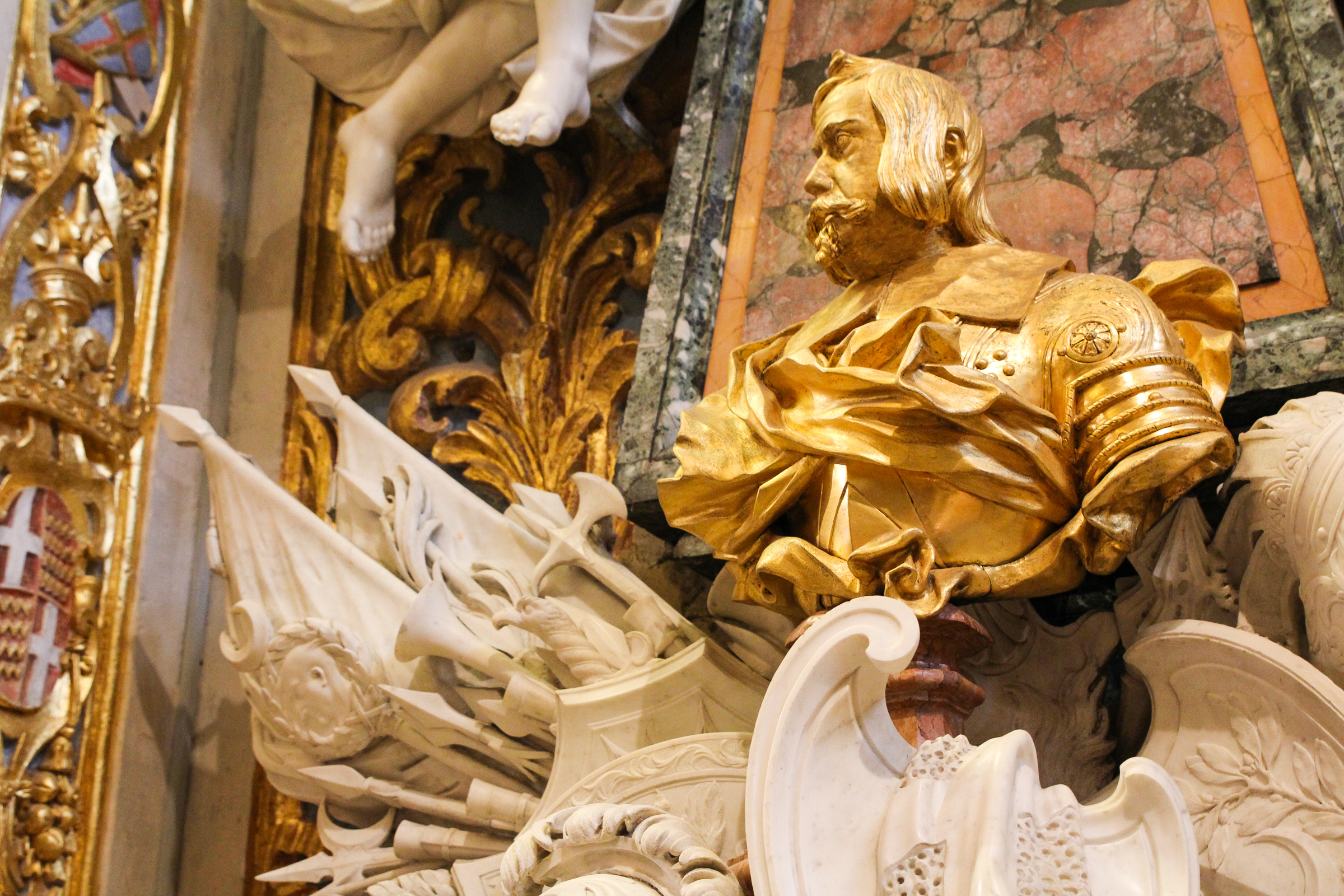
Bust of Cotoner at Saint John's Co-Cathedral

A strategist and a diplomat, he greatly increased the prestige of the order, mainly in France, Venice and England. In 1674 funded in Malta a school of Anatomy and Medicine as an annex of the Sacra Infermeria. He drew up (in Italian) the constitutions and estatutes of the order (1674).

Nicolas Cotoner continued the work on the redecoration of St. John's Co-Cathedral commenced by his brother, Rafael, and much of the splendour of the Cathedral occurred during his reign including the decoration of the vault painted by the Calabrian artist Mattia Preti as well as much of the carving and gilding of most of the walls.

He died on 29 April 1680 and is buried in the Chapel of Aragon in the Co-Cathedral. He was succeeded by Fra Gregorio Carafa.

The sepulchral monument to Grand Master Nicolas Cotoner, located prominently to the right side of the main altar in the chapel of the langue of Aragon in St John's Co-Cathedral, was produced by Domenico Guidi and is one of the most prominent and beautiful monuments in the Cathedral. The remarkable Cotoner monument consists of a pyramidal distribution of figures with a central grouping of triumphal paraphernalia such as arms and trophies which surround the bronze gilded bust of the Grand Master. Above a cherub holds the Cotoner armorial shield whilst the allegory of Fame blows a trumpet in triumph. The sepulchral monument was assembled in the chapel in June 1686.

Preceded by Raphael Cotoner	Grand Master of the Knights Hospitaller; 1663–1680	Succeeded by Gregorio Carafa
