= Marcos Antonio Cotoner =

Spanish politician and military personnel (1665–1749)

Marcos Antonio Cotoner y Sureda (1665–1749), was a Spanish noble, politician and military. 1st marquess de Ariany and I Regidor of Palma de Mallorca following the Nueva Planta decrees issued by Philip V of Spain.
