= Antonio Cotoner y Vallobar =

Former Ambassador to Philip's II Royal court

Antonio Cotoner y Vallobar had been acting in the Res publica of his country, having demonstrated special talents and deserving the trust of the sworn representatives of the city and the Kingdom of Majorca to perform an important commission. He had taken oath as representative of the city and the Kingdom of Majorca for the "braç militar'" in 1568 and was appointed Nuncio, or extraordinary Ambassador of the Studium generale of Majorca to Philip's II Royal court in Madrid, with the delicate mission to manage the approval of a "Real Audiencia'" in Majorca.

Royal sanction was granted at the Royal Palace of Aranjuez on May 11, 1571, disposition fully reproduced in a 1618 bulletin that refers to Antonio Cotoner as Sindic, Procurator, and Nuncio of the University of Majorca and as being commissioned the formality and planning to the establishment of such court as well as the Legal proceeding to follow in attention to the business granted to its jurisdiction.

The recognition or elevation of Antonio Cotoner to the highest ranking Estate existing at the time in Majorca was an accolade to the work he had done; this took place while he was in Madrid, having demonstrated his diplomatic abilities and succeeding in setting up the "Real Audiencia'". King Philip II with his own hand knighted him in 1572. This ceremony constituted at the time the highest honor in Habsburg Spain, having gained the support and appreciation of the powerful and austere monarch.
