= Mews (company) =

Hospitality software company

- Type: Private
- Industry: Software, hospitality technology
- Founded: 2012; 14 years ago
- Founder: Richard Valtr
- Headquarters: Amsterdam, Netherlands
- Area served: Worldwide
- Key people: Matthijs Welle (CEO); Richard Valtr (founder)
- Products: Property management systems, payments, point of sale, revenue management
- Website: www.mews.com

Mews is a hospitality software company headquartered in Amsterdam, Netherlands. Founded in Prague in 2012, it develops cloud-based software for hotels and other accommodation businesses. Its platform covers property management, reservations, payments, revenue management and hotel operations.

The company grew out of a hotel project developed by Czech entrepreneur Richard Valtr. During its early development Matthijs Welle joined the project and later became CEO. Mews then expanded internationally through investments and also acquisitions. The company was US$2.5 billion following an investment led by EQT Growth in 2026.

== History ==
=== Founding and early growth ===
Mews was founded in Prague in 2012 by Richard Valtr while he was working on the development of a hotel in the city. Dissatisfied with existing hotel-management systems, Valtr began developing a new cloud-based system for hotel operations. Matthijs Welle, who had previously worked in the hotel industry, joined during the company's early development.

The software was built as a cloud-based property management system (PMS), handling functions such as reservations, check-in and payments. It was also designed to connect with third-party applications through an application programming interface (API).

Mews received a €1.5 million investment from Axivate Capital in 2016, followed by a €6 million round led by Notion Capital in 2018. In 2019, it raised US$33 million in a round led by Battery Ventures.

=== Pandemic and recovery ===
The COVID-19 pandemic disrupted Mews and its hotel customers in 2020 as international travel fell sharply. The company reduced its workforce and revised its growth strategy in response. As travel and hotel activity recovered, Mews returned to growth.

The company also began broadening its platform through acquisitions. It acquired point-of-sale software provider Bizzon in 2022, expanding into hotel food-and-beverage operations and payments.

Later that year, Mews raised US$185 million in a round co-led by Kinnevik and Goldman Sachs Asset Management, valuing the company at US$865 million..

=== Expansion ===
In March 2024, a US$110 million funding round valued Mews at US$1.2 billion. The company operated in more than 85 countries, with annualised net revenue of about US$100 million and gross payments volume exceeding US$8 billion.

Mews continued expanding its product range through acquisitions. In 2024, it bought several hospitality-software companies, including Swedish revenue-management provider Atomize.

A further US$75 million round led by Tiger Global Management followed in March 2025.

In 2025, Mews acquired Flexkeeping, a hotel housekeeping and operations platform, and artificial-intelligence analytics company DataChat.

In January 2026, a US$300 million investment led by EQT Growth valued Mews at US$2.5 billion. The company served more than 15,000.

In July 2026, Mews announced a restructuring that reduced its workforce by about 15 percent. Valtr linked the changes to the company's growing use of artificial intelligence and a shift toward smaller teams with broader responsibilities.

== Products and services ==
Mews began as a cloud-based property management system for hotels. Its software handles reservations, room allocation, check-in and check-out, guest profiles, housekeeping and payments. The platform also supports integrations with third-party hospitality applications through APIs.

The product range later expanded beyond property management. Bizzon added point-of-sale and food-and-beverage functions, Atomize added revenue-management software, and Flexkeeping added housekeeping and staff-operations tools.

Payment processing is integrated into the platform. Gross payments volume increased from US$2.3 billion in 2022 to about US$19.7 billion in 2025.

== See also ==
- Property management system
- Hospitality industry
- Travel technology
