= St. Helen's Gate =

- Il-Bieb ta' Santa Liena
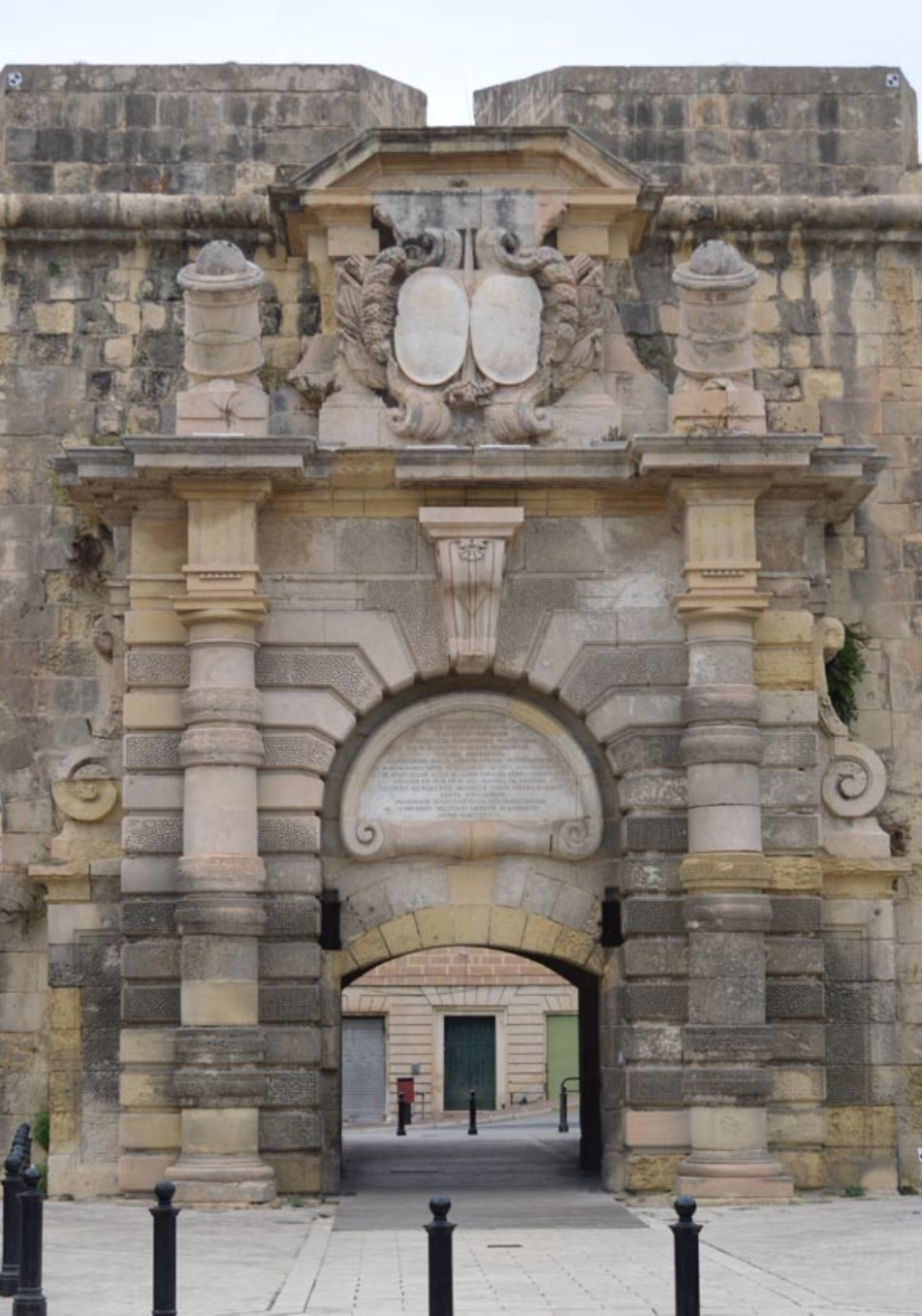
- St Helen's Gate
- Alternative names: Porta dei Mortari

General information
- Status: Intact
- Type: City gate
- Architectural style: Baroque
- Location: Cospicua, Malta
- Coordinates: 35°52′45.1″N 14°31′14.7″E
- Completed: 1736
- Owner: Government of Malta

Technical details
- Material: Limestone

Design and construction
- Architect(s): Charles François de Mondion

St. Helen's Gate (Maltese: Il-Bieb ta' Santa Liena), also known as Porta dei Mortari, is the main gate of the Santa Margherita Lines, located in Cospicua, Malta. It was built in the Baroque style in 1736 to designs of Charles François de Mondion, during the magistracy of Grand Master António Manoel de Vilhena.

== History ==
Construction of the Santa Margherita Lines began in 1638, but works stopped in 1645 and were only resumed in 1715. St. Helen's Gate was built in 1736 to designs of the French architect Charles François de Mondion. The gate is located at the centre of St. Helen's Curtain, a stepped curtain wall between St. John Almoner and St. Helen's Bastions, and it served as the main entrance into the city of Cospicua.

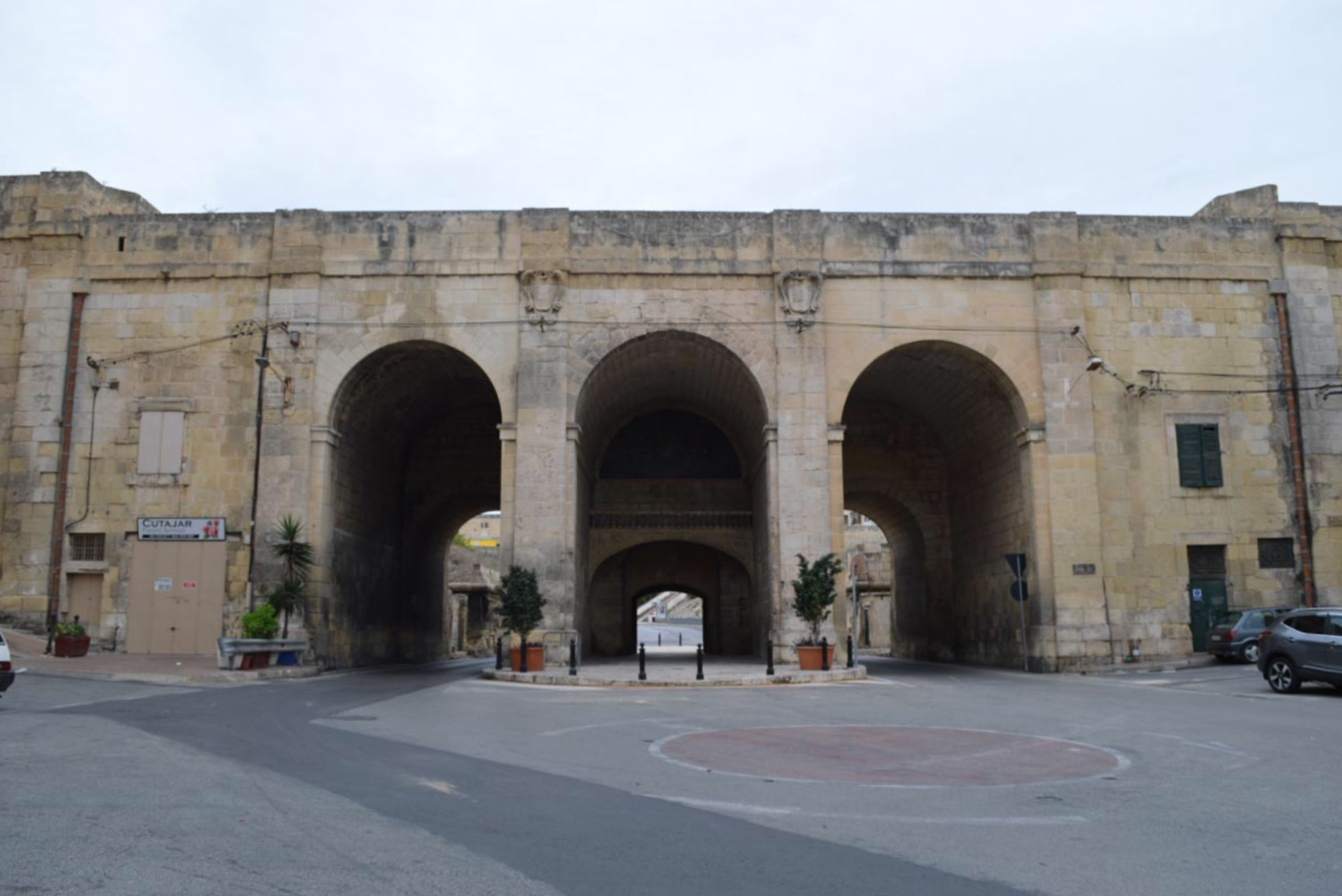
Back view of the gate

The gate originally had an à la Vauban drawbridge, but this was replaced by a chain-and-tackle mechanism in the early 19th century. The gate also had casemates with two corpi di guardia which housed the sentries watching the gate. In 1947, under the direction of the Reconstruction Minister Dom Mintoff, the sentry rooms were demolished in order to make way for two modern openings to enable passage for vehicular traffic. The gate was originally protected by a triangular lunette and a tenaille, but these were dismantled in the 19th century to make way for a new road.

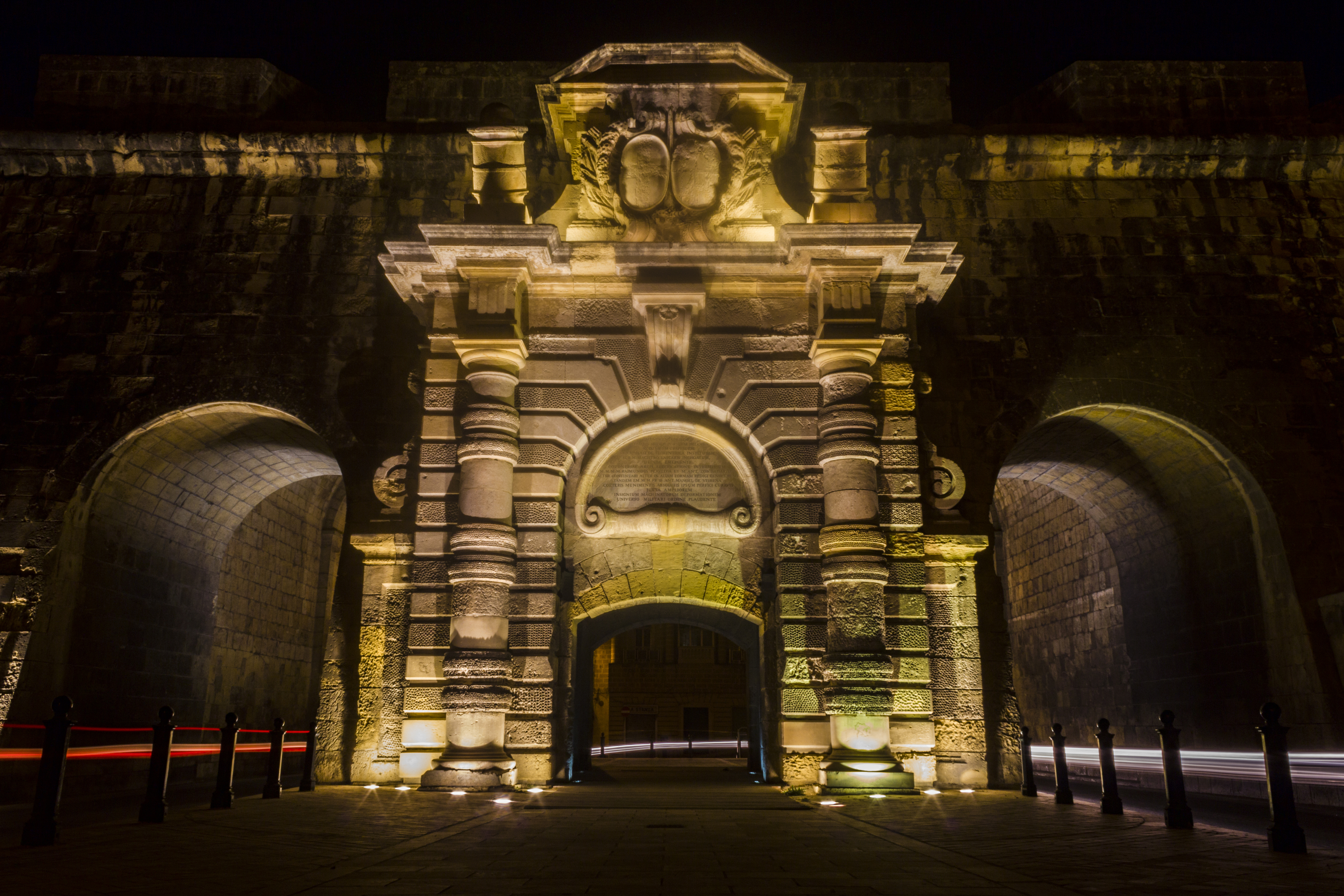
The gate illuminated at night

The gate was restored in 1999 and 2004, and archaeological excavations were carried out, revealing the gate's original drawbridge pit. The area around the gate was subsequently paved and light fixtures were installed.

The gate was included on the Antiquities List of 1925. It is now scheduled as a Grade 1 national monument, and it is also listed on the National Inventory of the Cultural Property of the Maltese Islands.

== Architecture ==
St. Helen's Gate consists of a Baroque portal, and it is regarded as one of the most beautiful 18th-century Hospitaller gateways. The portal's main façade is built out of alternating plain and rusticated hardstone masonry courses, and it also contains an ornate keystone and two half-columns which support a cornice. A carved marble mortar stands above each column, and these gave the gate the name Porta dei Mortari. A central pediment is found between the mortars, and it contains two marble escutcheons separated by a carved sword. These originally depicted the coats of arms of the Order of St. John and of Grand Master António Manoel de Vilhena, but were defaced during the French occupation of Malta in 1798.

The arched entrance is surmounted by a marble plaque containing the following Latin inscription, which gives an account of the construction of the Santa Margherita Lines:

MUNIMENTUM HOC
AD MAJUS HORUM PORTUUM TUTAMEN
SECUNUUM GRAPHIDEM
A CARDINALI DE FLORENTIOLA INSTITUTUM
SUB M. MAGISTRO LASCARIS INCHOATUM
DEINDE EMERGENTE
COTONERI.E ARCIS ÆDIFICATIONE INTERMISSUM
MM. MM. RAYMUNDUS PERELLOS, ET M. ANT ZONDADARIUS
ALTER CONTINUARI, ALTER IN ALIAM FORMAM REDIGI CONSUERUNT
TANDEM EM. M. M. FR. D. ANT. MANOEL DE VILHENA
COETERIS MUNIMENTIS ABSOLUTIS, IPSUM PERPICI CURAVIT
JUXTA AMPLIOREM
INSIGNIUM MACHINATORUM DEFORMATIONEM
UNIVERSO MILITARI ORDINE PLAUDENTE
ANNO MDCCXXXVI

(meaning This fortress, built to the design of Cardinal Firenzuola, for the greater defence of these harbours, in the reign of Grand Master Lascaris, was suspended owing to the building of the Cottonera defences. Grand Masters Raymond Perellos and Marc'Antonio Zondadari decided respectively to proceed with and to alter the construction. Finally, His Eminence Grand Master Brother Lord António Manoel de Vilhena, in the same way that he completed the other forts, ordered that these defences be completed to a larger design by more skilled architects, with the approbation of the whole Military Order in the year 1736.)

Architecturally, the gate is similar to the Main Gate of Fort Manoel, which had been designed by Mondion in 1726. It is one of only two gates in Malta which bear representations of life-sized artillery pieces, the other one being Porte des Bombes which was built in 1721.

On the interior of the Baroque gate is a copy of an original painting by Mattia Preti. On 4 December 2000, the painting was taken down by the Restoration Unit for restoration. Herman Bonnici was the architect responsible for the conservation project of the gate and the rehabilitation of the vicinity.

=== Restoration ===
In May 2023, Culture Minister Owen Bonnici announced a €1 million project to restore the gate and the bastion wall between St John Almonier bastion and St Helen’s bastion. The project is being handled by the Restoration and Preservation Department and follows similar restoration works carried out in 1999.
