= Anton B. Dougall =

Maltese chef and writer (born 1952)

Anton B Dougall (born March 8, 1952) is a Maltese chef, writer and television personality.

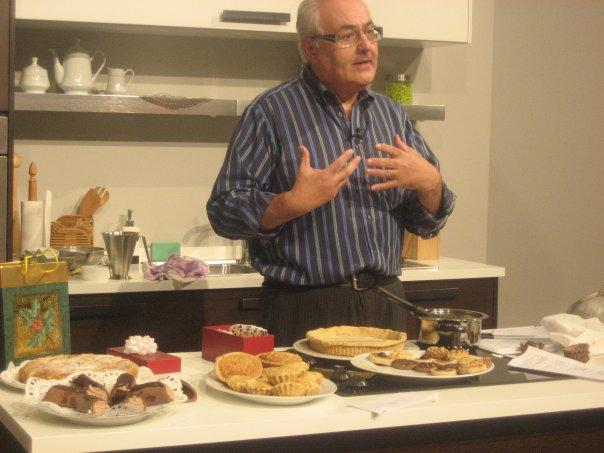
Anton B Dougall filming a cooking show

== Personal life ==
Dougall was born in Cospicua, Colony of Malta and attended several schools, including MCAST (Malta College of Arts, Science and Technology) and Westminster College in the UK, and graduated from the Catering College, Leeds Polytechnic in the UK.

== Career ==
Dougall started working as a chef at the Villa Rosa Hotel in Malta in 1971 when he was 19 years old. He had his first television series on cooking and published his first cookery book the very same year called Tisjir Professjonali.

In 1976 Dougall opened Klabb tat-Tisjir, a cookery club in Malta. Ten years later, Dougall had his business in publishing and contract catering, was the owner of restaurants and a hotelier.

Dougall hosted a series of 120, 45 minute cookery television episodes on the national Maltese station.

Throughout his career, Dougall promoted Maltese food in Europe (including London, Paris and Italy) and North Africa. He currently has a guest spot on 2 different local TV stations and various radio talk shows including a guest spot on RTK every Friday, something he has been doing the past 15 years.

Dougall was the chef patron for state banquets during the presidencies of Anton Buttigieg and Agatha Barbara. He is a member of the Hotel and Catering Institute, the Royal Society of Health, Contract Caterers Association, Association Culinaire Francaise and Cuochi Italiani.

== Publications ==
Dougall has published over 40 cookery books in Maltese, English and German, plus a set of 350 cookery cards.
