= Hotel Technology Next Generation =

International trade association

- Abbreviation: HTNG
- Formation: 2002
- Founder: Douglas Rice
- Type: Not-for-profit trade association
- Purpose: Develop standards for the hospitality industry
- Website: www.htng.org
- Formerly called: Hotel Technology Next Generation

Hospitality Technology Next Generation (HTNG) is a global non-profit trade association serving hotel companies and technology providers.

== History ==
The Hospitality Technology Next Generation was founded in 2002 under the name Hotel Technology Next Generation. It was officially founded by Douglas Rice and nine hotel IT executives actually formed the core of the founding members. At that time, hotels sometimes had 50 different systems that were not inter-operable. HTNG estimated in 2005 that $25 billion was spent annually and worldwide by hotel companies in IT solutions.

In 2013, HTNG released a secure payments framework for hotels, but mentioned it would be efficient only if the whole industry were to use it. Still in 2013, HTNG signed a partnership agreement with China Hospitality Technology Alliance to share data across continents. In January 2015, Smartrac joined the HTNG to work on the door lock security group of the organization. The Hospitality Finance, Revenue Management and IT Professionals Association (HOSPA) also joined the HTNG, starting with HOSPOA-member Royal Automobile Club.

In 2016, HTNG partnered with the magazine Hospitality Technology to merge their hospitality-focused conferences in North America.

In June 2017, Hotel Technology Next Generation changed its name to Hospitality Technology Next Generation.

In August 2018, HTNG published a white paper regarding the implementation of voice technologies in hotels. In September 2018, HTNG signed a partnership agreement with Hospitality Financial and Technology Professionals (HFTP) to share development resources. By 2019, the OpenTravel Alliance joined its relationship management with HTNG.

== Description ==
The Hospitality Technology Next Generation is governed by a board of directors consisting of senior technology executives from hotel companies. Membership is open to companies and individuals involved with hospitality technology.

The organization's stated objective is to promote interoperability of the many technology systems used in the hotel industry, such as property management systems, point-of-sale systems, telephone systems, building automation systems, guest room entertainment systems such as video on demand, security and access control systems, and many others. The organization's members meet regularly in small workgroups, where hotel companies and vendors work together to design interface standards (often using XML), reference architectures, network designs, and hospitality-specific network devices. HTNG holds annual members' meetings in North America, Europe, and Asia.

HTNG operates a certification program for selected specifications, administered by The Open Group.

== Governance ==
In May 2015, Raman P. Rama was named on the board of HTNG. In June 2015, Michael Blake was named EVP and CEO of HTNG, replacing Douglas Rice who led the organization for 13 years.

== See also ==
- Travel technology
- OpenTravel Alliance
