= OwlTing Group =

Taiwanese fintech company

- Native name: 奧丁丁集團
- Type: Public company
- Traded as: Nasdaq: OWLS
- Industry: Fintech
- Founded: 2010
- Founders: Darren Wang
- Headquarters: Taipei, Taiwan
- Area served: Worldwide
- Key people: Darren Wang (CEO)
- Products: OwlPay, OwlNest, OwlTing Market
- Revenue: ▲US$7.86 million (FY2025)
- Number of employees: ~200 (2025)
- Website: www.owlting.com

OwlTing Group (operating as OBOOK Holdings Inc.) is a Taiwanese financial technology company headquartered in Taipei. The company develops software for payments, supply chain tracking, and hospitality management. Its payment service operates in 41 U.S. states and also holds a Virtual Asset Service Provider (VASP) license in the European Union and an Electronic Payment Intermediary Service Provider (Bank API) license in Japan.

In October 2025, it became the first Asia-based fintech company to be directly listed on Nasdaq.

== History ==
OwlTing was founded in 2010 by Darren Wang, a former Google employee. The company initially focused on e-commerce before shifting to blockchain applications in 2014.

Early applications of its technology included a blockchain-based food traceability system used to track pork supply chains, as well as a pilot project in eastern Taiwan that used sensors and data collection to monitor rice production. In 2017, the company launched OwlNest, a blockchain-integrated hotel management system designed to eliminate overbookings. OwlTing introduced its payment platform, OwlPay, in 2023, which supports both fiat and USDC-based transactions.

In 2025, the OBOOK Holdings Inc. was directly listed on the Nasdaq under the ticker symbol OWLS through a direct listing and also ranked among the top two global companies in the "Enterprise & B2B" category by CB Insights. In 2026, the company appeared in the Financial Times ranking of high-growth Asia-Pacific companies.

== Operations ==
OwlTing’s operations include digital payments, hospitality software, and e-commerce platforms. Its payment activities are centered on OwlPay, a platform that supports settlement and cross-border transfers using blockchain networks. The platform expanded through integrations with the Circle Payments Network and Visa Direct.

In the hospitality sector, the company operates OwlNest, a cloud-based property management system for reservations and booking synchronization. It also operates OwlTing Market, an e-commerce platform focused on farm-to-table transparency and food traceability.

In June 2026, OwlTing partnered with Credible Finance to enhance cross-border payments with countries like the United States, China, and India.

== See also ==
- Property management system
- Supply chain management
- E-commerce
- Financial technology
