= Cospicua =

Cospicua Bormla Bir Mula, Burmola, Bormola Città Cospicua
- Local council
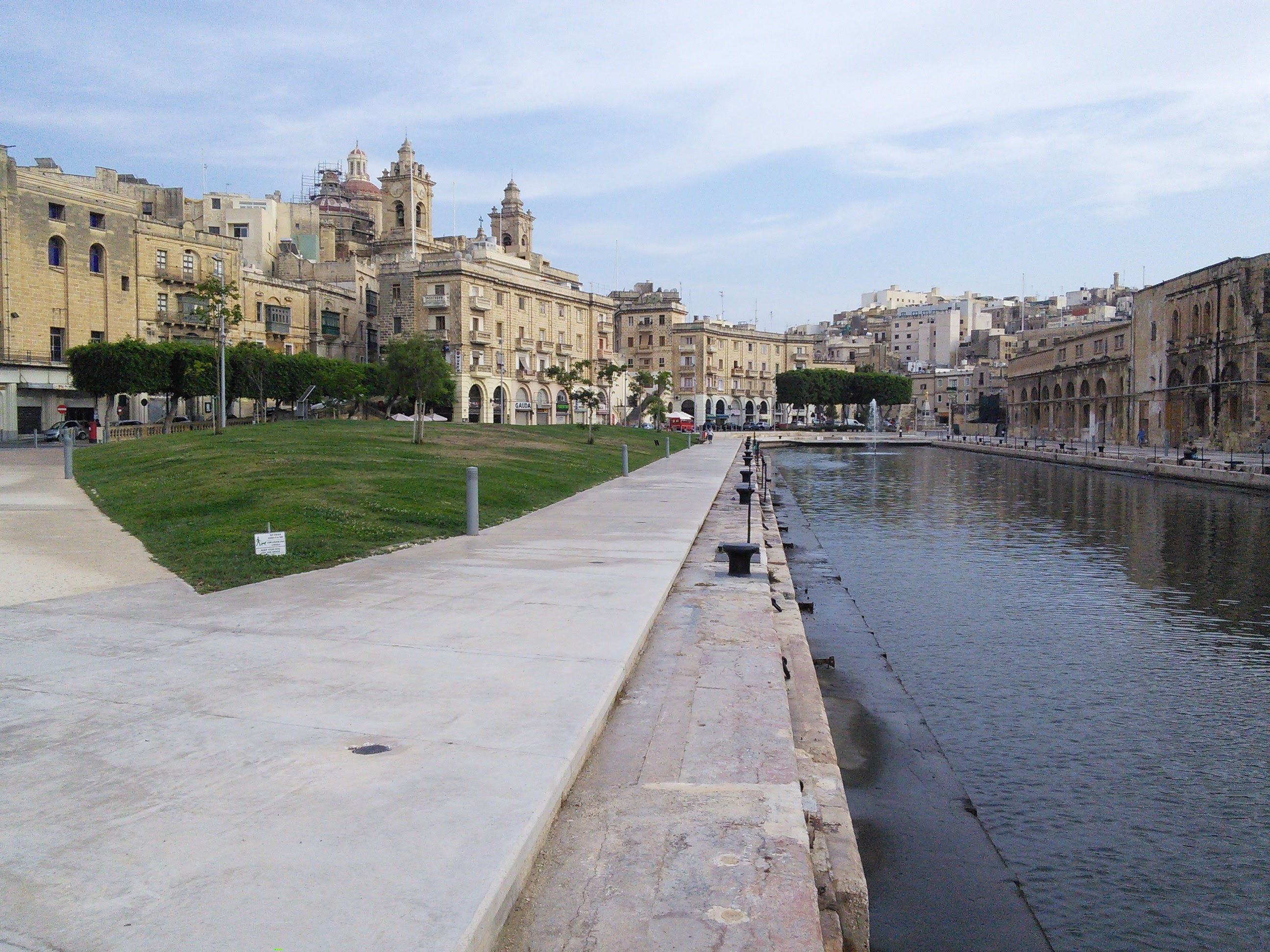
- Bormla as seen from Dock No. 1

- Flag Coat of arms
- Nickname: Belt l-Immakulata
- Motto: Ingens Amplectitur Agger (Embraced by a large bastion)
- Location within Malta Location within Mediterranean
- Coordinates: 35°52′56″N 14°31′20″E
- Country: Malta
- Region: Port Region
- District: Southern Harbour District
- Borders: Birgu, Fgura, Kalkara, Paola, Senglea, Żabbar

Government
  - Mayor: Marco Agius (PL)

Area
  - Total: 0.9 km^{2} (0.35 sq mi)

Population (Jul. 2024)
  - Total: 4,807
  - Density: 5,300/km^{2} (14,000/sq mi)
- Demonym(s): Bormliż (m), Bormliża (f), Bormliżi (pl)
- Time zone: UTC+1 (CET)
  - Summer (DST): UTC+2 (CEST)
- Postal code: BML
- Dialing code: 356
- ISO 3166 code: MT-06
- Patron saint: Immaculate Conception or the Virgin Mary
- Day of festa: 8 December

Cospicua (Italian) or Bormla (Maltese, [ˈbɔrmlɐ]) is a double-fortified harbour city in the Port Region of Malta. It served as the principal port of Phoenician Malta and, through Greek, Latin, and Arabic, may have given its name to the island and country. Along with Birgu and Senglea, it is one of the Three Cities located within the Grand Harbour to the east of the capital city Valletta. With a population of 5,395 as of March 2014, it is the most dense city of the Three Cities. Locals are known for their Cottonera dialect.

== Names ==
The ancient Phoenician name Maleth meant "refuge" or "port", cognate with Hebrew malat (מָלַט, "escape"). The Greek Melítē (Μελίτη) and Latin Melita probably derived from this toponym, despite being reapplied to Malta and then inland Phoenician settlement at Mdina after its conquest in the Second Punic War. The Maltese name Bormla probably derives from a combination of Arabic būr (بور) and the Phoenician name. It has also been folk etymologized to derive from Old Maltese bir mula, literally "well of the landlord", from biʔr Mawlā (بِئْر مَوْلَى), supposedly intending "well of the Lord".

== History ==
Bormla has been inhabited since Neolithic times. The Phoenician colony there was known as Maleth, established at some point after sea level rise destroyed earlier coastal settlements during the 10th century BC.

By the arrival of the Order of Saint John, it was known as Bormla. Its fortifications, protecting both the town and its neighbours Birgu and Isla, were begun in 1638 but not completed for another 70 years. In 1722, Grand Master Marc'Antonio Zondadari declared Bormla a city and in view of its strong bastions named it Città Cospicua.

In 1776, the Order of St. John started to construct a dockyard, which was to play a vital role in the development of this city. During British rule in Malta, the Royal Navy made extensive use of the dockyard, particularly during the Crimean War, the First World War and during the years preceding the Second World War. Bormla, along with the rest of the area around the Grand Harbour, was heavily bombed during this last war as Malta was under siege by the Axis powers.

As Malta became an independent country, the city's dockyard frequently became a bone of contention between the General Workers' Union, to which most of its employees belonged, and successive governments. In the early 21st century the dockyard was substantially downsized under the governance of the Nationalist Party after it was found that the cost of operating the site was responsible for around 25% of Malta's national debt. Plans are now underway for the transformation of an area of the dockyard into a commercial and tourist centre.

Bormla is also known as Belt l-Immakulata or the City of the Immaculate, referring to the Immaculate Conception or the Virgin Mary, who is the patron of the city. Every year a feast is being held on 8 December.

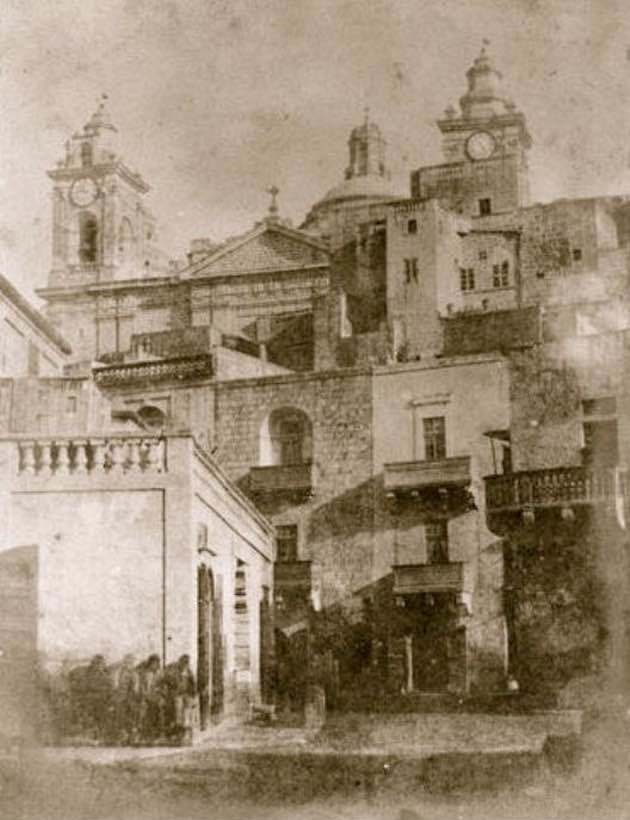
Cospicua in 1846. Calotype by Calvert Jones

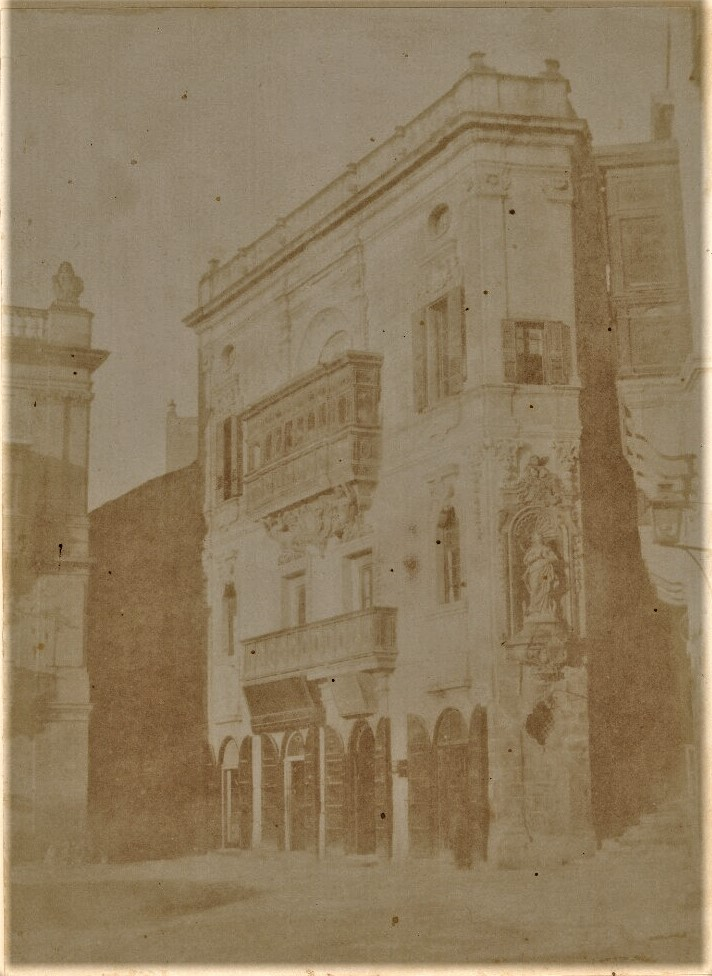
Cospicua in 1846. Calotype by Calvert Jones

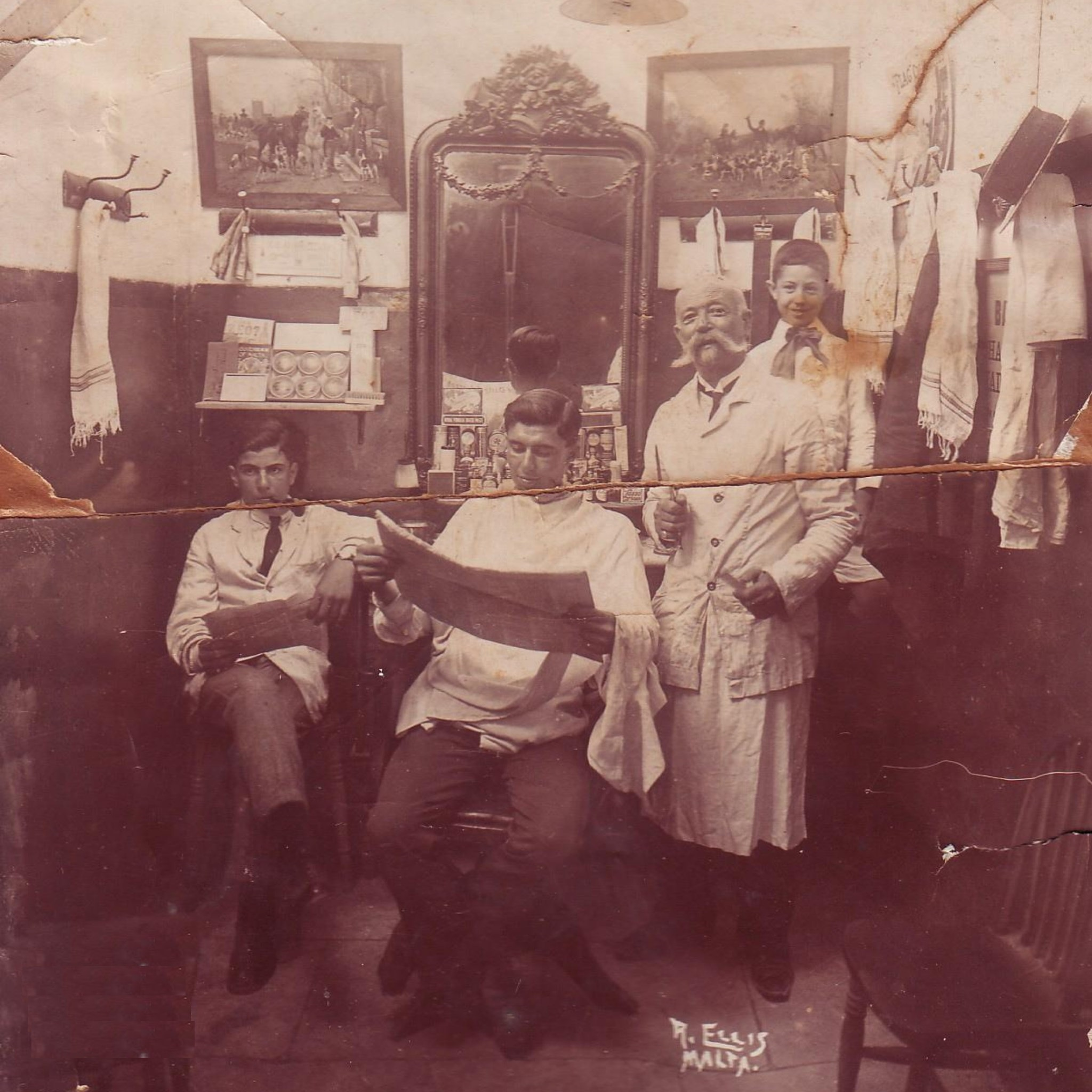
Cannavò barber shop on Cospicua's waterfront, 1910s, by Richard Ellis

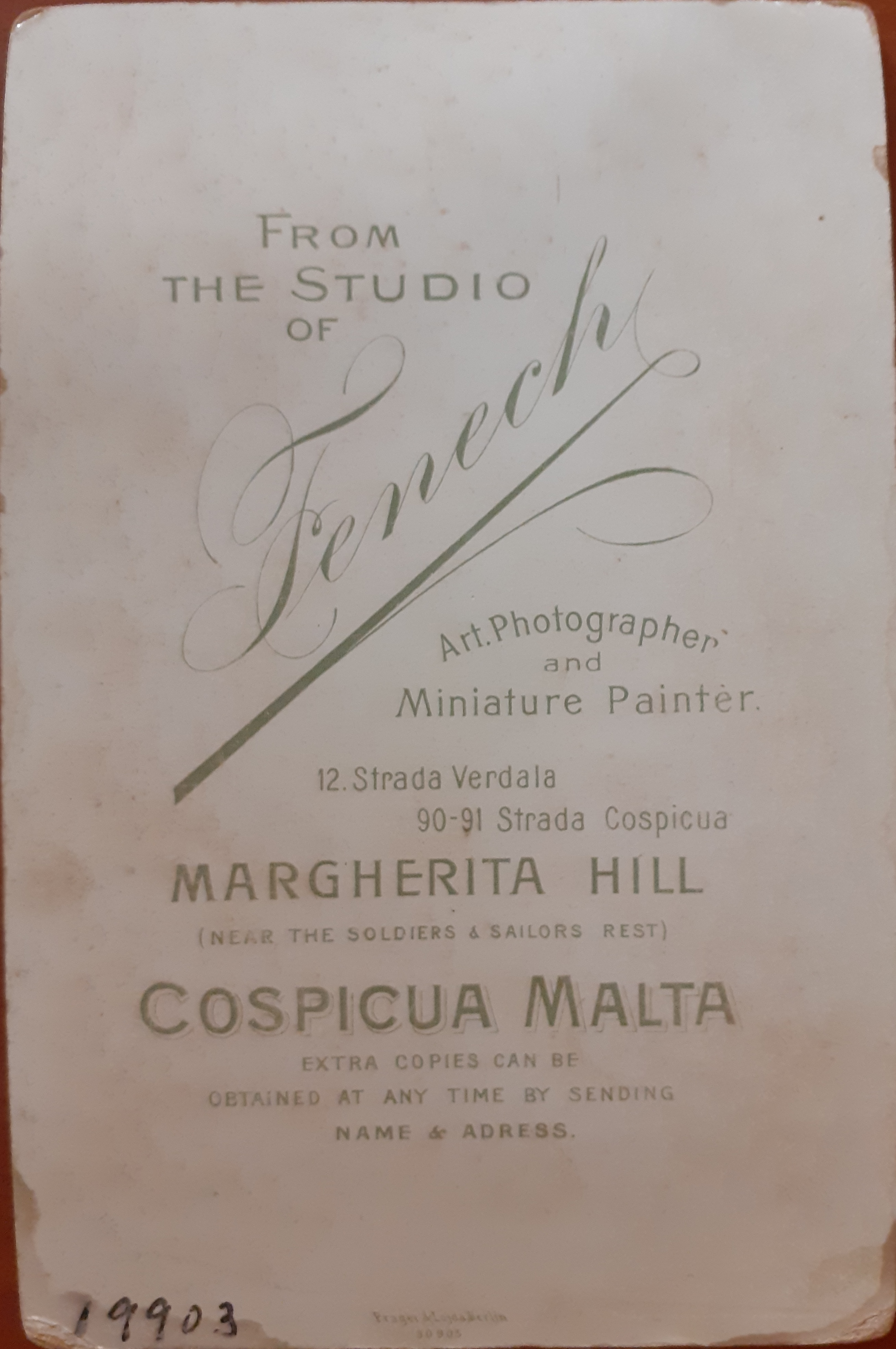
19th-century Fenech photography studio ad in Cospicua

== Culture ==
Cospicua celebrates its feast which is held annually on 8 December in honour of the Immaculate Conception. Cospicua is known for its celebration of Good Friday, which began in the 18th century and is a popular tourist attraction. A statue of the Resurrection of Jesus is traditionally carried across the city's streets to symbolize Jesus' triumph over death. Smaller statues are also exhibited in the city.

The people of Bormla started the famous and artistic first 'Mejda tal-Appostli', which literally means, the table of the Apostles. It consists of a display showing the food that was eaten during the Last Supper of Jesus and the 12 Apostles. It also consists of different stories of the Bible, made with coloured rice and salt, on plates (these are done separately).

Bormla's football team is the St. George's F.C., thought to be the oldest on the island. Documentation shows that by 1885 there were already three football teams at Cospicua, which merged to form the current club in 1890. Cospicua is also famous for its Regatta team, which was one of the first. This team has won 17 shields (titles) overall, second only to Senglea.

The 1st Cospicua Scout Group as formed in 1917. The St. George's Band Club was officially founded in 1862. Its first name was 'La Banda dei Cospicuani' but when Giorgio Crispo Barbaro, Marquis of St. George became first president of the Band, the name was changed to the present one.

== Architecture ==
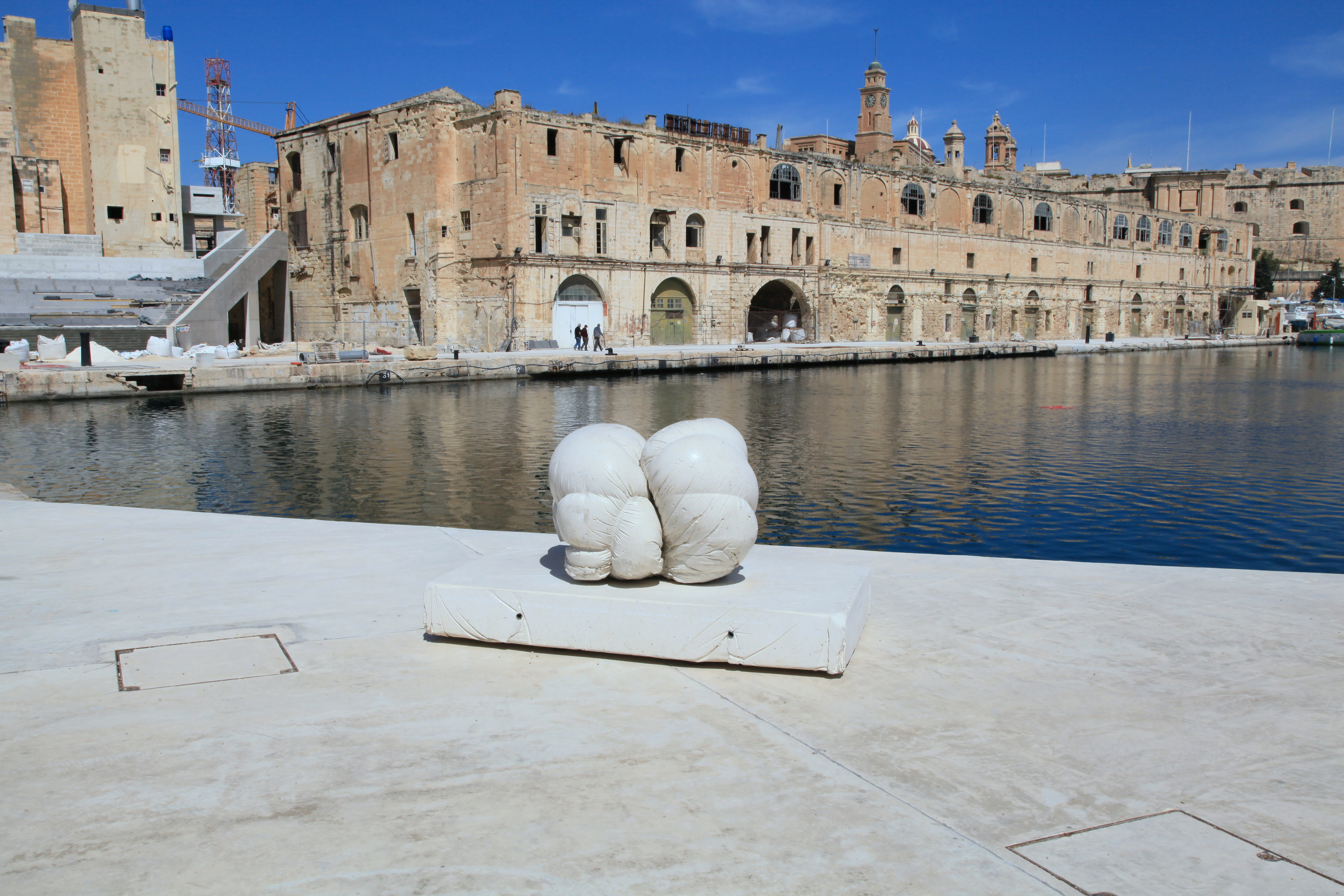
Dock buildings at Cospicua built by the Order of St John and enlarged by the British

The city's fortifications, namely the Santa Margherita Lines and the Cottonera Lines, are largely intact although they are in need of restoration. Saint Helen's Gate, also known as Vilhena Gate, is a gateway which forms part of the Santa Margherita Lines which is a tourist attraction itself. The Dock area also has some Georgian architecture.

The Parish church of the Immaculate Conception, the church of St. Theresa, and the chapels of St. Paul and St. Margaret are also attractions. The celebrations and feasts on Good Friday, Easter Sunday, and the village feast on 8 December also attract tourists, as well as the statues of the Resurrection and the Immaculate Conception.

Cospicua also has an ethnography, social history, anthropology museum and cultural venue known as Bir Mula Heritage. A 16th century lodge built by the Order of St John, simply known as The Lodge, is also used for exhibitions and other events. Adjacent to the lodge is another 16th-century building which houses a community radio station Kottoner 98FM.

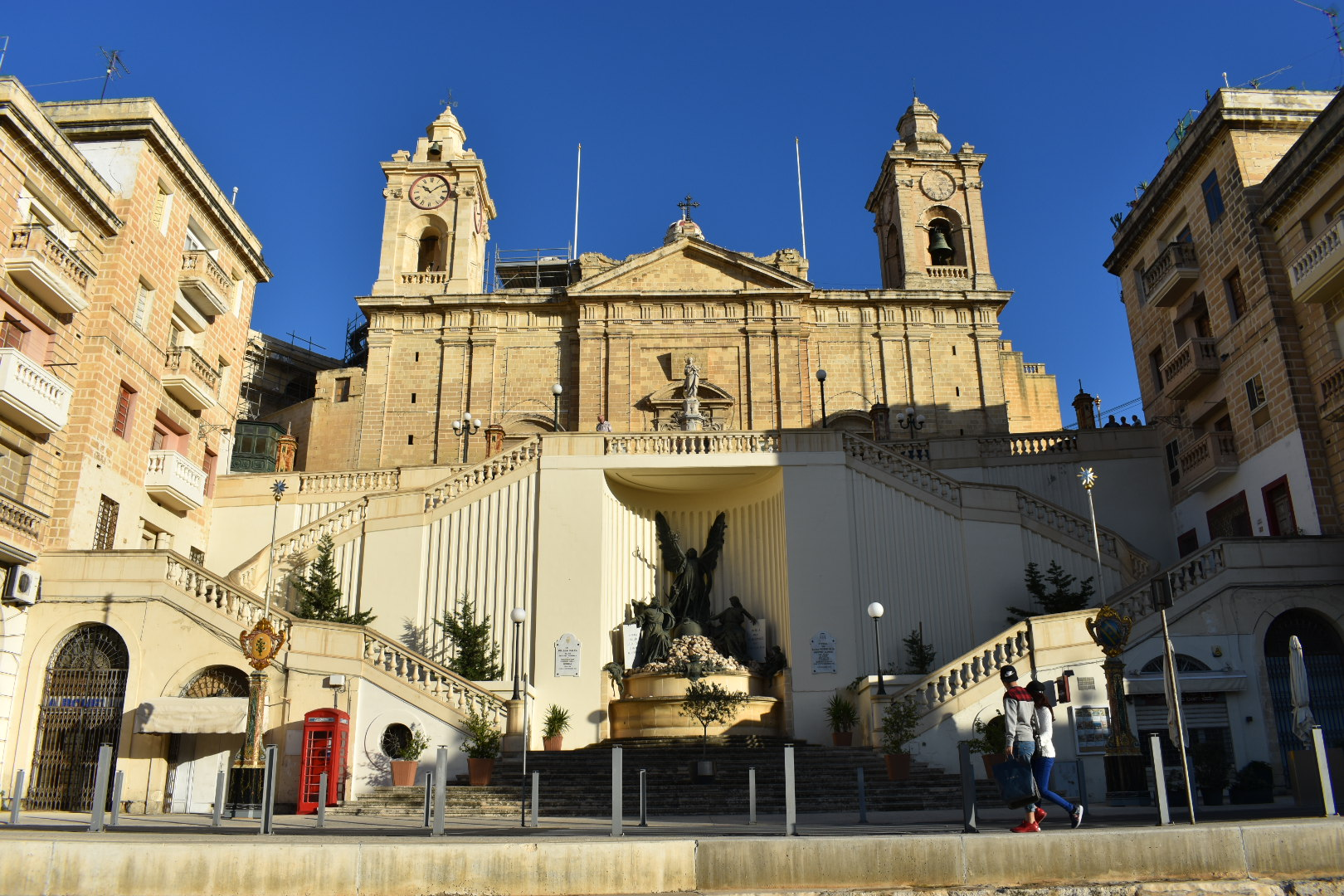
Parish Church of the Immaculate Conception

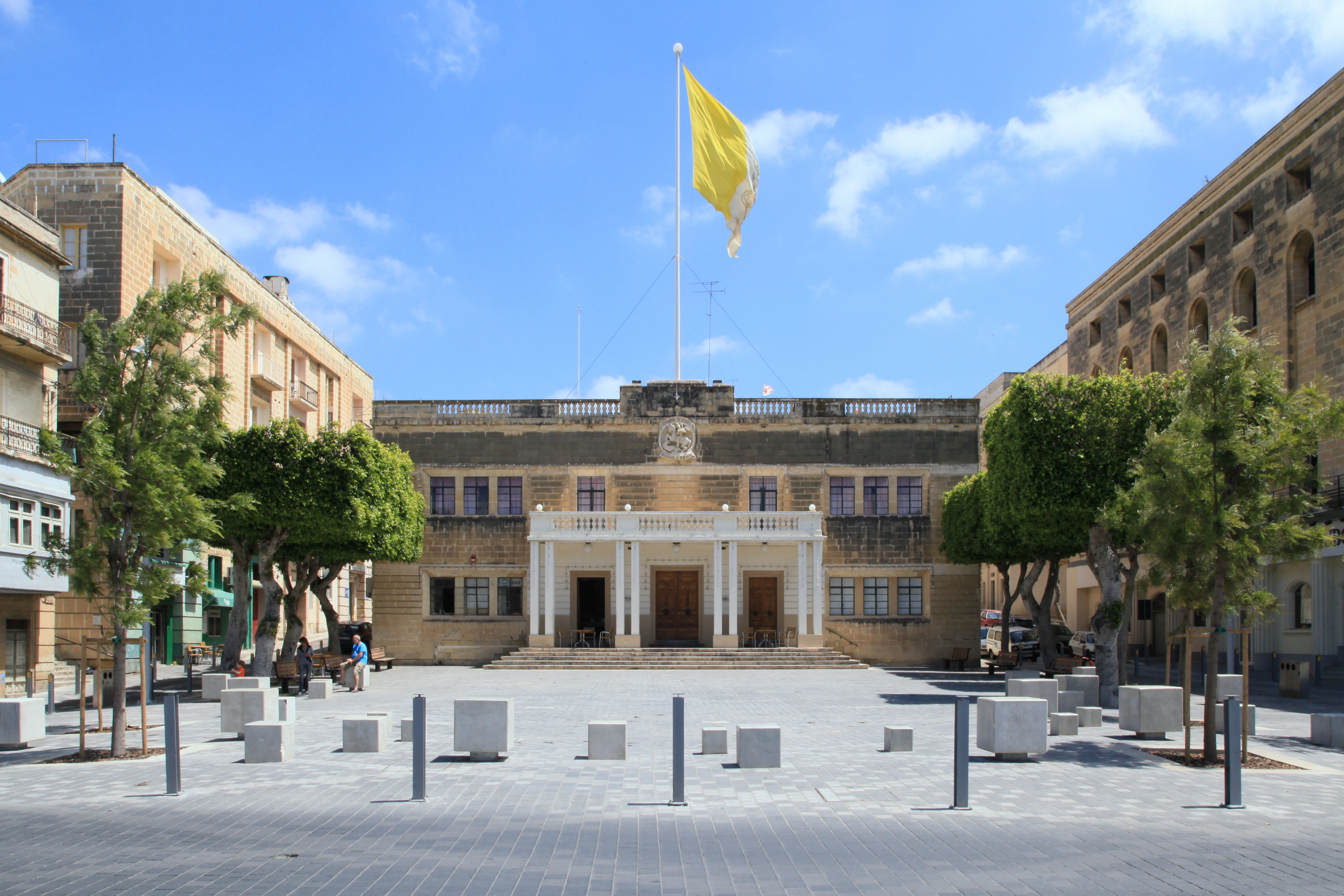
Kazin tal-Banda San Ġorġ

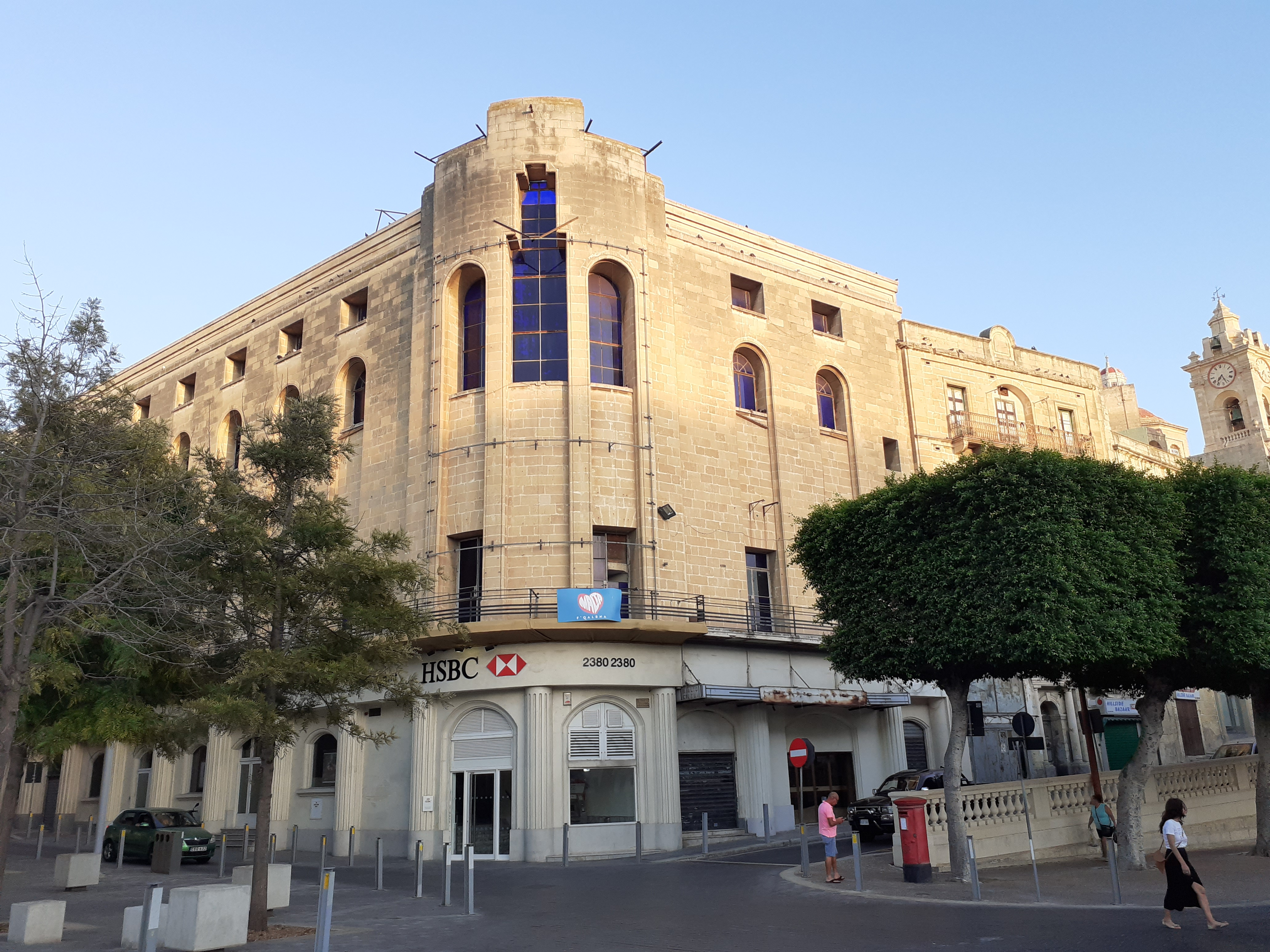
Former Cinema Rialto

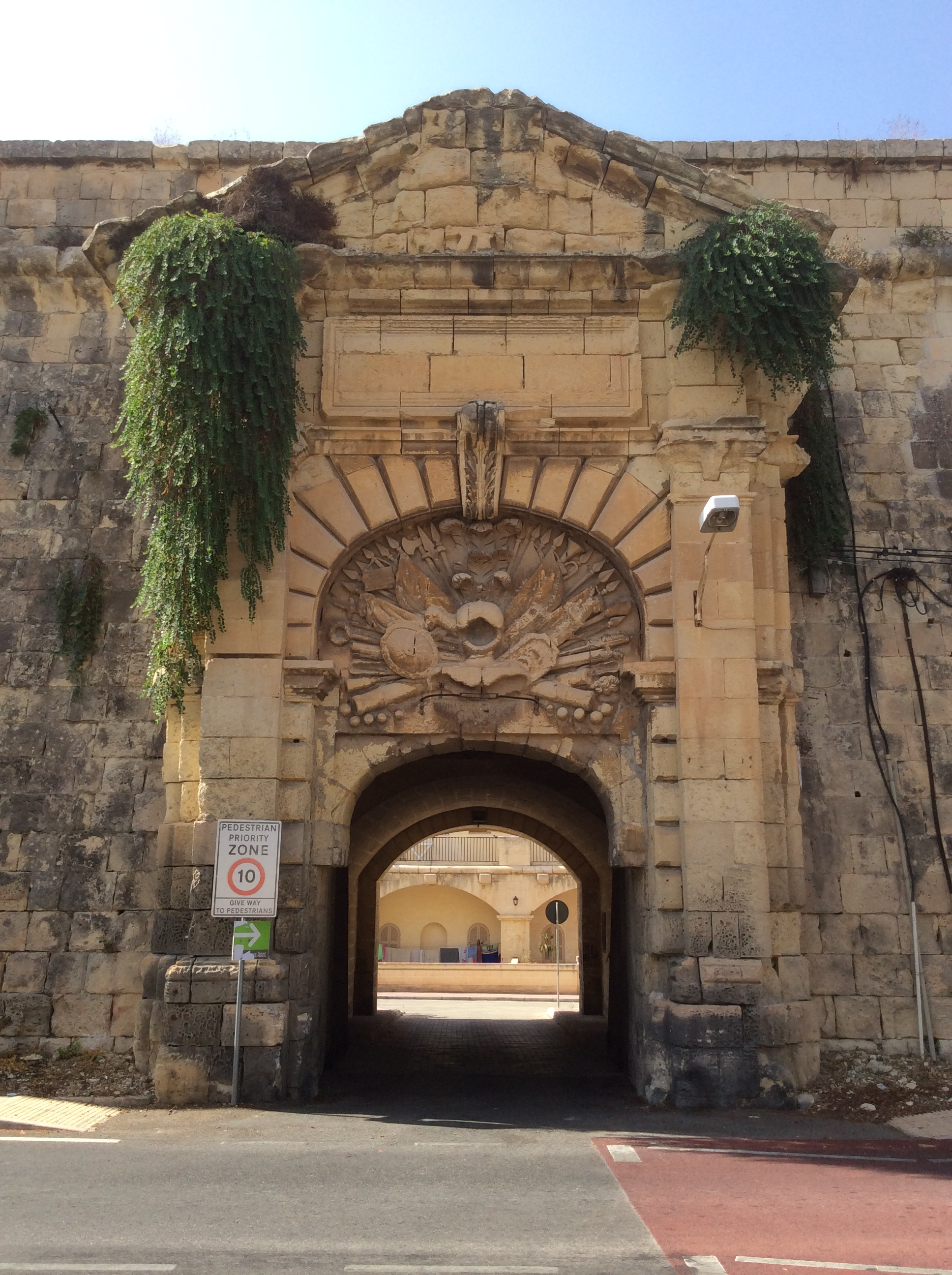
Verdala Gate

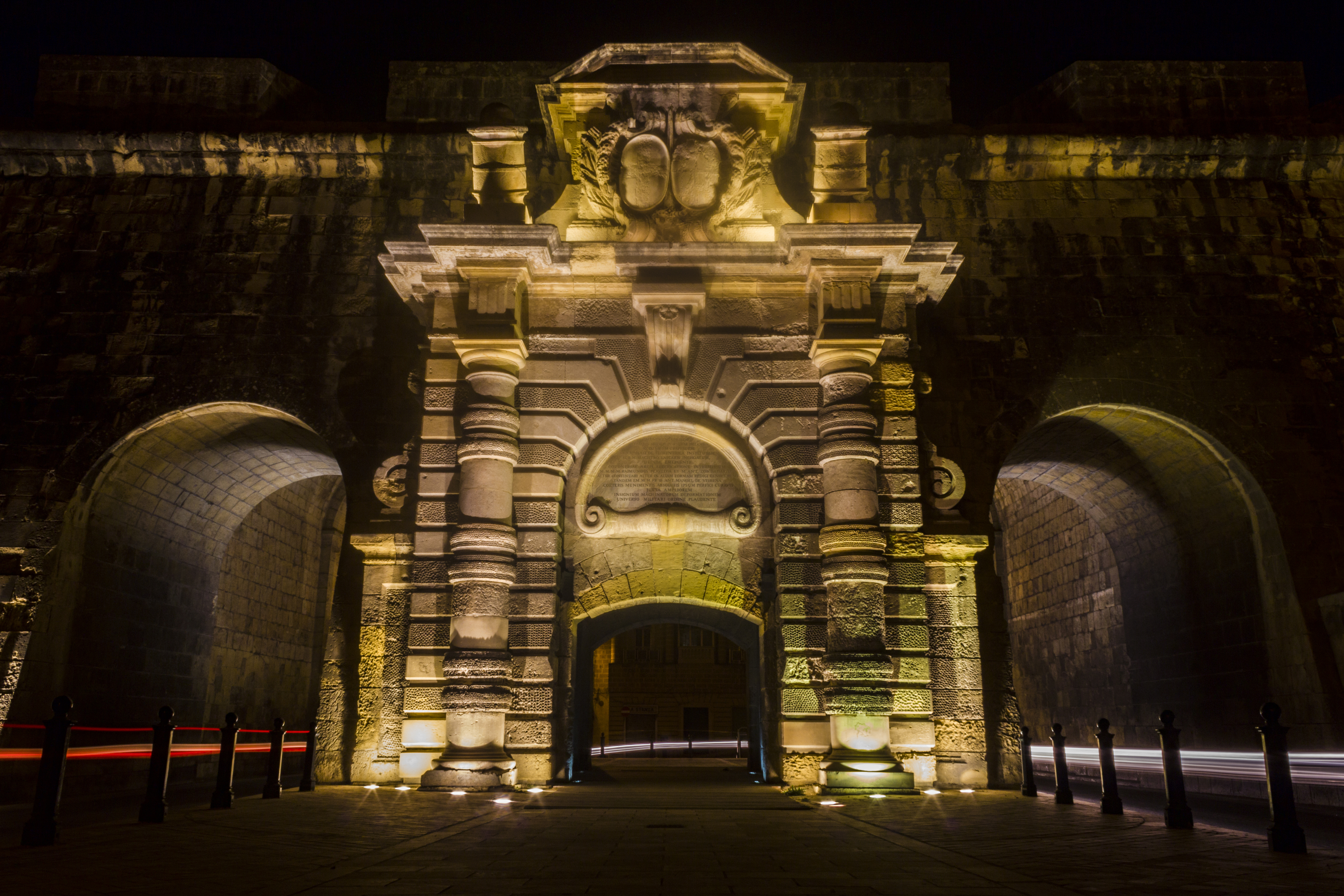
St Helen's Gate

== Demographics ==
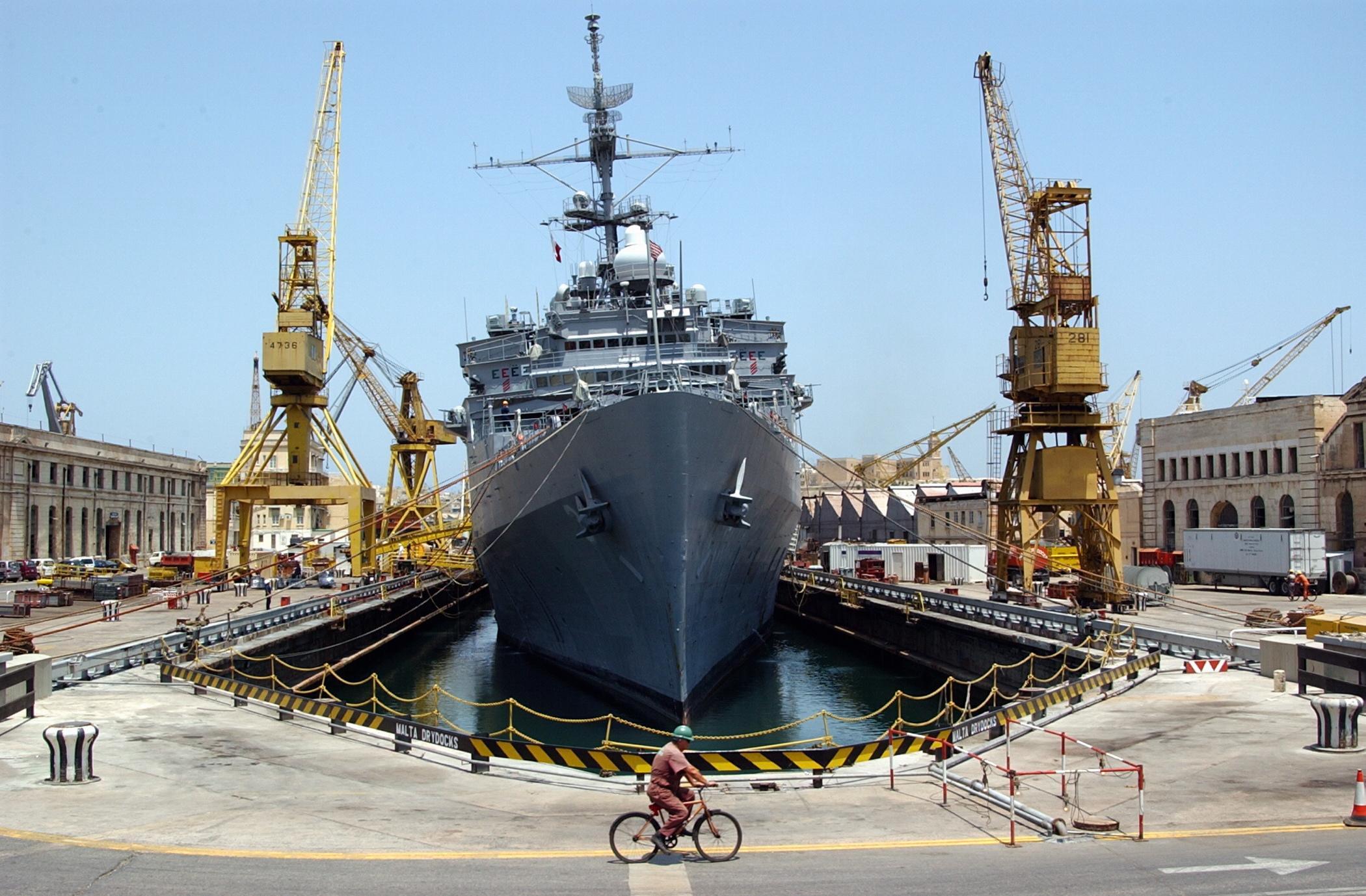
A Maltese shipyard worker heads home on his bicycle after a day's work on USS La Salle in Cospicua.

The population of Cospicua was 4,807 in July 2024. This included 2508 males and 2299 females; 4126 Maltese nationals and 681 foreign nationals.

The first recorded census of the Maltese islands took place in 1901. Cospicua (listed as Bormla in census documents) is recorded as having a population of 12,148 people. This figure remained relatively stable until 1931, but by 1948 had reduced to 4,822. After rising to 9,095 by 1957 and 9,123 in 1967, the city's population fell in the following three censuses. A March 2011 estimate gave the population of Cospicua as 5,658. Its population stood 5,479 as of March 2013, and 5,395 in March 2014.

== Notable people ==
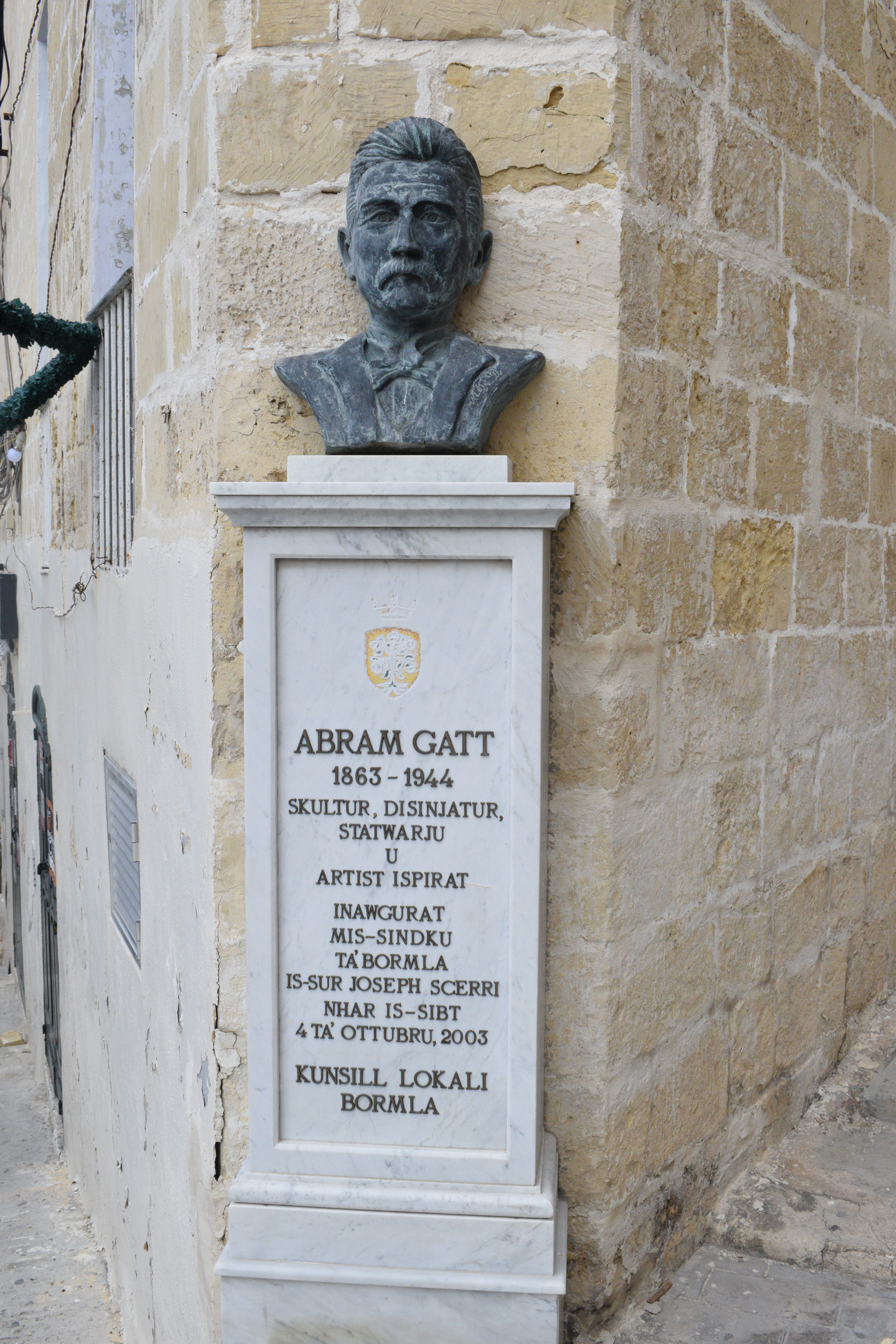
Bust of Abram Gatt in Bormla

- Karmenu Mifsud Bonnici (former Prime Minister and leader of the Labour Party);
- Ugo Mifsud Bonnici (former Minister and also a former President of Malta);
- Anton B. Dougall (born 1952), Maltese chef, writer and television personality.
- Dom Mintoff (former Prime Minister and leader of Labour Party) and
- Erin Serracino Inglott (linguist and author) whom a school in the city is named after.
- Abram Gatt (sculptor)
- Gianni Vella (artist)
- Paolino Vassallo (composer)

== Government ==
Bormla's local council was established by the Local Councils Act of 1993. The first election was held on 16 April 1994 and Joseph Carbonaro was elected as mayor. After the 2000 elections, Paul Muscat became mayor and after the 2003 elections he was succeeded by Joseph Scerri. Scerri remained mayor for 10 years before being succeeded by Alison Zerafa after the 2013 elections.

== Zones in Bormla ==
The following is a list of places in Bormla:

- Dock No. 1
- Fortini ta' Feliċ
- Kortina San Nikola
- San Ġwann t'Għuxa
- Fuq San Pawl
- Fuq Santa Margerita
- Fuq Verdala
- Ta' Santa Liena
- Tal-Foss
- Xatt ta' Bormla
- Ix-Xgħajra ta' Bormla

In addition, the zone of Tal-Ħawli was also historically part of Bormla. However this area was put under the jurisdiction of the Birgu Local Council in 1994.
