= Santa Margherita Lines =

Line of fortifications in Cospicua, Malta

- Is-Swar ta' Santa Margerita
- Cospicua, Malta
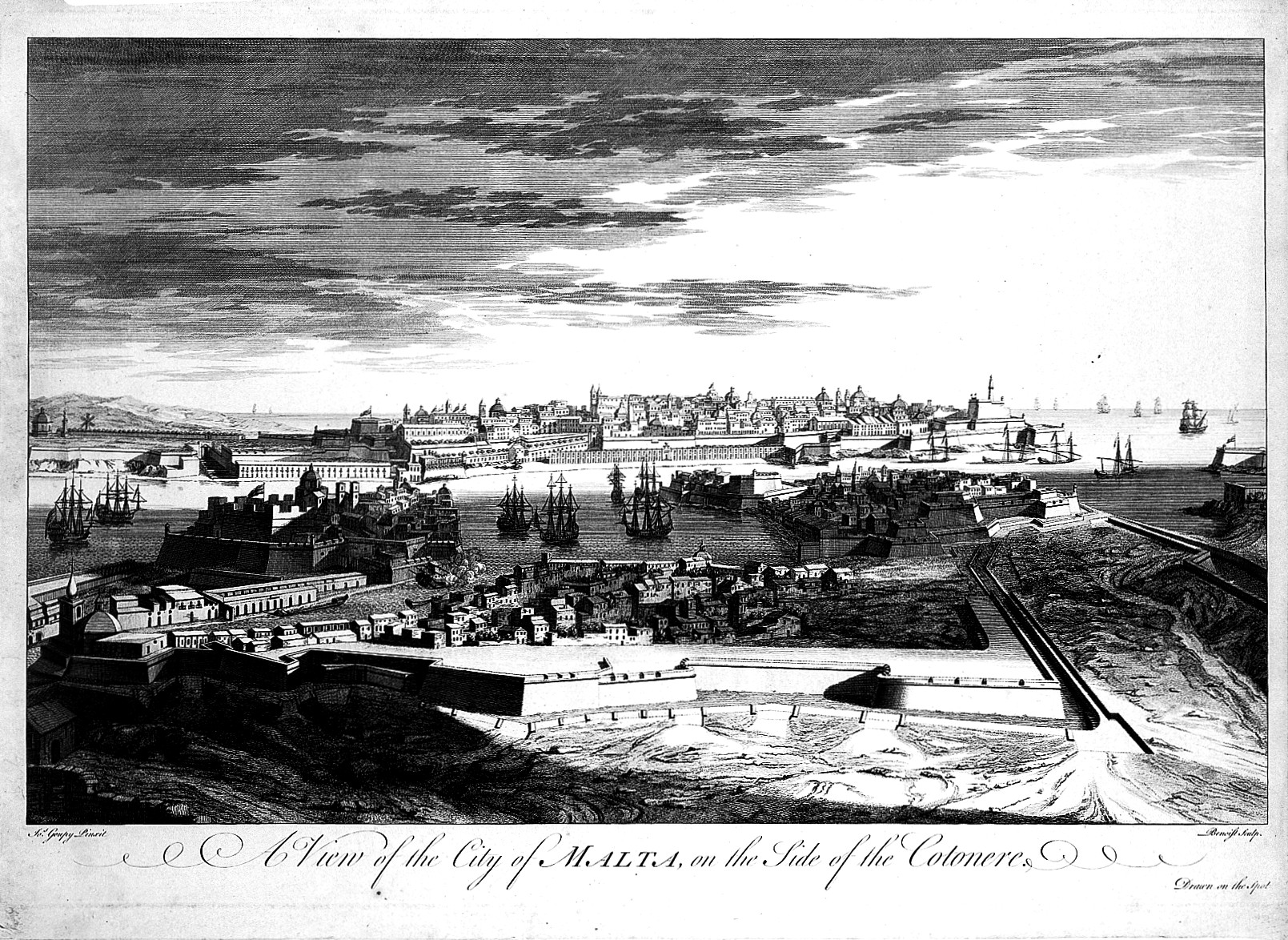
- The Santa Margherita Lines in their original form in c.1725

Site information
- Type: Line of fortifications
- Owner: Government of Malta
- Condition: Partially intact

Location
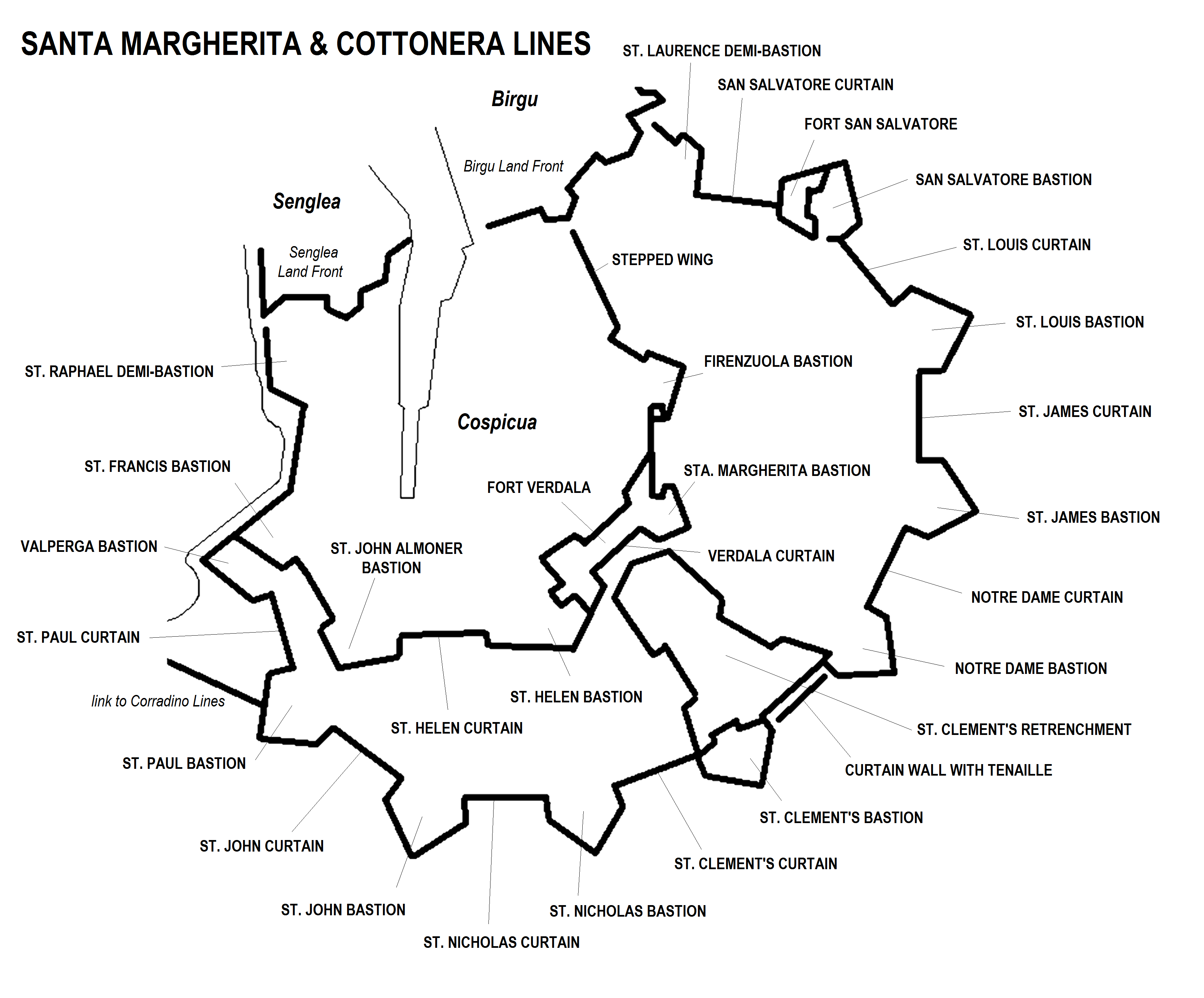
- Map of the Santa Margherita Lines and the Cottonera Lines. The Santa Margherita Lines are the inner line of fortifications.
- Coordinates: 35°52′44.4″N 14°31′23.8″E

Site history
- Built: 1638–1645, 1715–1736
- Built by: Order of Saint John
- Materials: Limestone
- Battles/wars: Siege of Malta (1798–1800)

The Santa Margherita Lines (Maltese: Is-Swar ta' Santa Margerita), also known as the Firenzuola Lines (Maltese: Is-Swar ta' Firenzuola), are a line of fortifications in Cospicua, Malta. They were built in the 17th and 18th centuries to protect the land front defences of the cities of Birgu and Senglea. A second line of fortifications, known as the Cottonera Lines, was later built around the Santa Margherita Lines, while the city of Cospicua was founded in the 18th century within the Santa Margherita and Cottonera Lines.

The Santa Margherita Lines have been on Malta's tentative list of UNESCO World Heritage Sites since 1998, as part of the Knights' Fortifications around the Harbours of Malta.

The lines, also known as Santa Margherita Enceinte, were built to the designs of the Dominican Cardinal Fra Vincenzo Maculano da Firenzuola.

== History ==
The foundation stone of the Santa Margherita Lines was laid on 30 December 1638 by Grand Master Giovanni Paolo Lascaris. The lines were designed by Vincenzo Maculano da Firenzuola, and were meant to protect the land fronts of Birgu and Senglea, and also to prevent a flanking attack on the capital Valletta. The lines were built on Santa Margherita Hill, known colloquially as il-Mandra, possibly on the ruins of an ancient Greek temple or an earlier castle. The hill is featured in the account of the Great Siege of 1565 by arquebusier Francesco Balbi di Corregio, who mentioned that a belvedere existed on it.

The engineer of the Grand Duke of Tuscany, Marquis di S. Angelo, has proceeded for the construction project in the building of the lines.

When the three central bastions were completed in 1645, construction work stopped due to a lack of funds. The lines remained unfinished for many years, and they became known as Fort Santa Margarita or Fort Margarita. In the 1670s, the Cottonera Lines were built around the still unfinished Santa Margherita Lines, but construction of the new fortifications was suspended in 1680 with the death of Grand Master Cotoner.

Construction of both the Santa Margherita and the Cottonera Lines resumed in 1715. At the time of completion in 1736, the Santa Margherita Lines consisted of five bastions, two demi-bastions, six curtain walls, three gateways, at least two sally ports, a ditch, a covertway with lunette, and a glacis.

The British modified the lines in the 1850s with the construction of Fort Verdala and St. Clement's Retrenchment. The latter connected the Santa Margherita Lines with the Cottonera Lines. In the late 19th century, the western part of the lines was demolished to make way for an extension of the Malta Dockyard.

The fortifications were included on the Antiquities List of 1925. Most of the lines still exist today, but they are in a dilapidated state. Modern roads breach some of the bastions and curtain walls.

== Layout ==
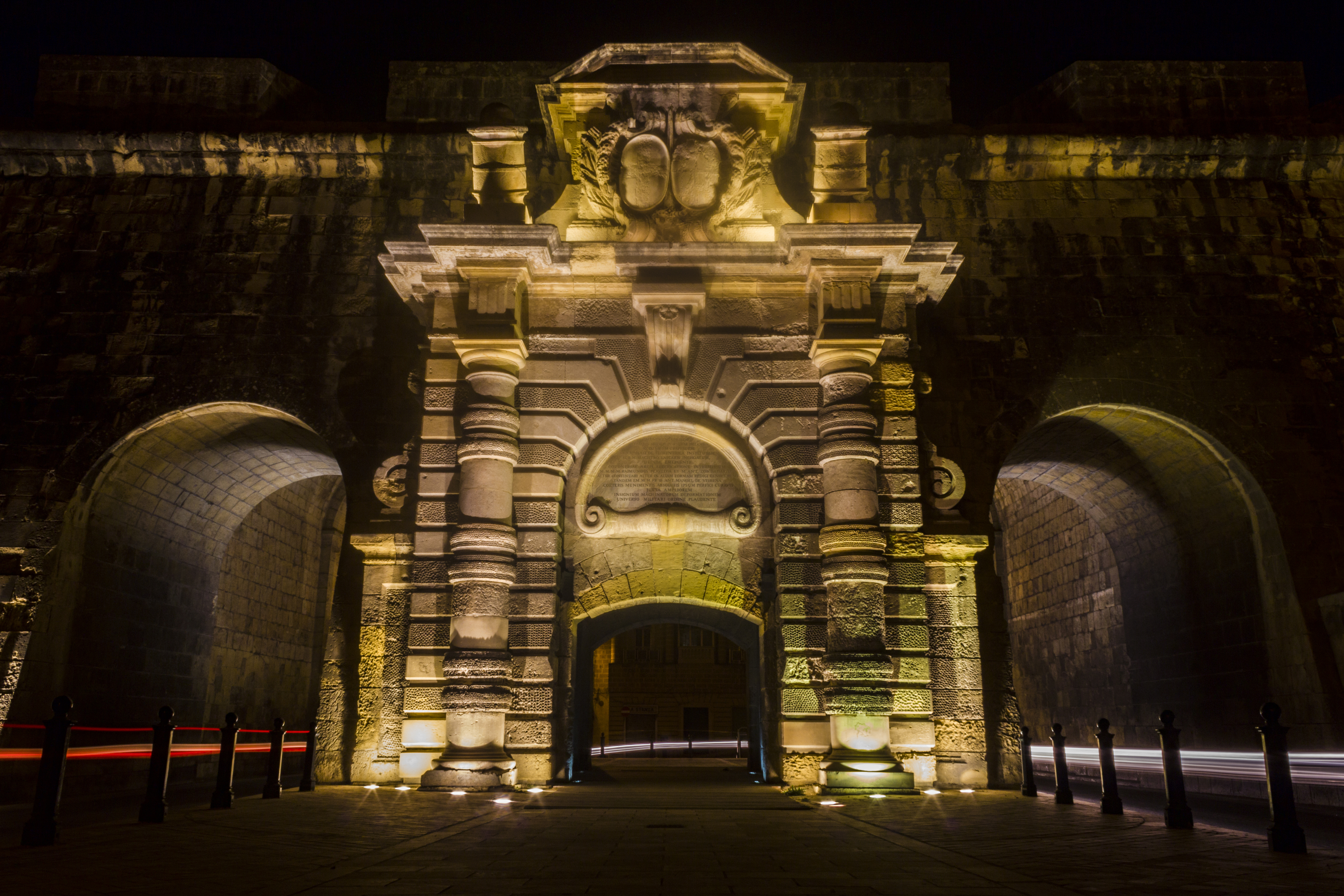
St. Helen's Gate

The Santa Margherita Lines as completed in 1736 consisted of the following bastions and curtain walls (listed going clockwise along the lines):

- a stepped wing linking the Birgu land front to Firenzuola Bastion. It is breached by a modern road.
- Firenzuola Bastion – a small asymmetrical bastion.
- an unnamed curtain wall linking Firenzuola and Sta. Margherita Bastions. It is breached by a modern road.
- Sta. Margherita Bastion – a small arrowhead type bastion, now incorporated into Fort Verdala.
- Verdala Curtain – a curtain wall linking St. Margherita and St. Helen Bastions. It contains Verdala Gate, and is incorporated into Fort Verdala and St. Clement's Retrenchment.
- St. Helen Bastion – a large bastion forming the central part of the lines. Its upper part is incorporated into Fort Verdala.
- St. Helen Curtain – a curtain wall linking St. Helen and St. John Almoner Bastions. It contains St. Helen's Gate, which is Cospicua's main gate, and two modern openings to allow the passage of traffic. It was originally defended by a tenaille and a lunette, which were dismantled in the 19th century.
- St. John Almoner Bastion – a two tiered bastion designed by Charles François de Mondion in the early 18th century. Its left face is breached by a modern road.
- an unnamed curtain wall linking St. John Almoner and St. Francis Bastions, containing a blocked up sally port. Its lower half was demolished in the 19th century to make way for the extension of the dockyard.
- St. Francis Bastion – a bastion which was demolished in the 19th century to make way for the extension of the dockyard.
- St. Raphael Demi-Bastion – a demi-bastion which was demolished in the 19th century to make way for the extension of the dockyard.

The 19th century additions by the British were:

- Fort Verdala – a fortified barracks built along Verdala Curtain.
- St. Clement's Retrenchment – a retrenchment linking the Santa Margherita Lines to the Cottonera Lines.
