= Hospitality (disambiguation) =

Hospitality refers to the relationship between a guest and a host, wherein the host receives the guest with goodwill.

Hospitality may also refer to:

- The hospitality industry, an umbrella term for several service industries including hotels, food service, casinos and tourism
- Hospitality service, a centrally-organized social network wherein travelers and tourists exchange accommodation without monetary exchange
- Hospitality (Hospitality album), 2012
- Hospitality (Venetian Snares album), 2006
- The Hospitality Branch, a tributary of the Great Egg Harbor River in southeastern New Jersey
- A brand of musical events hosted by Hospital Records
- Hospitality (band), a Brooklyn, NY band on Merge Records

== See also ==
- Hospitality ethics
- Hospitality management (disambiguation)
- Southern hospitality
- Hospital
