= Fort Verdala =

Fortified barracks in Cospicua, Malta

- Il-Fortizza Verdala
- Part of the Santa Margherita Lines
- Cospicua, Malta
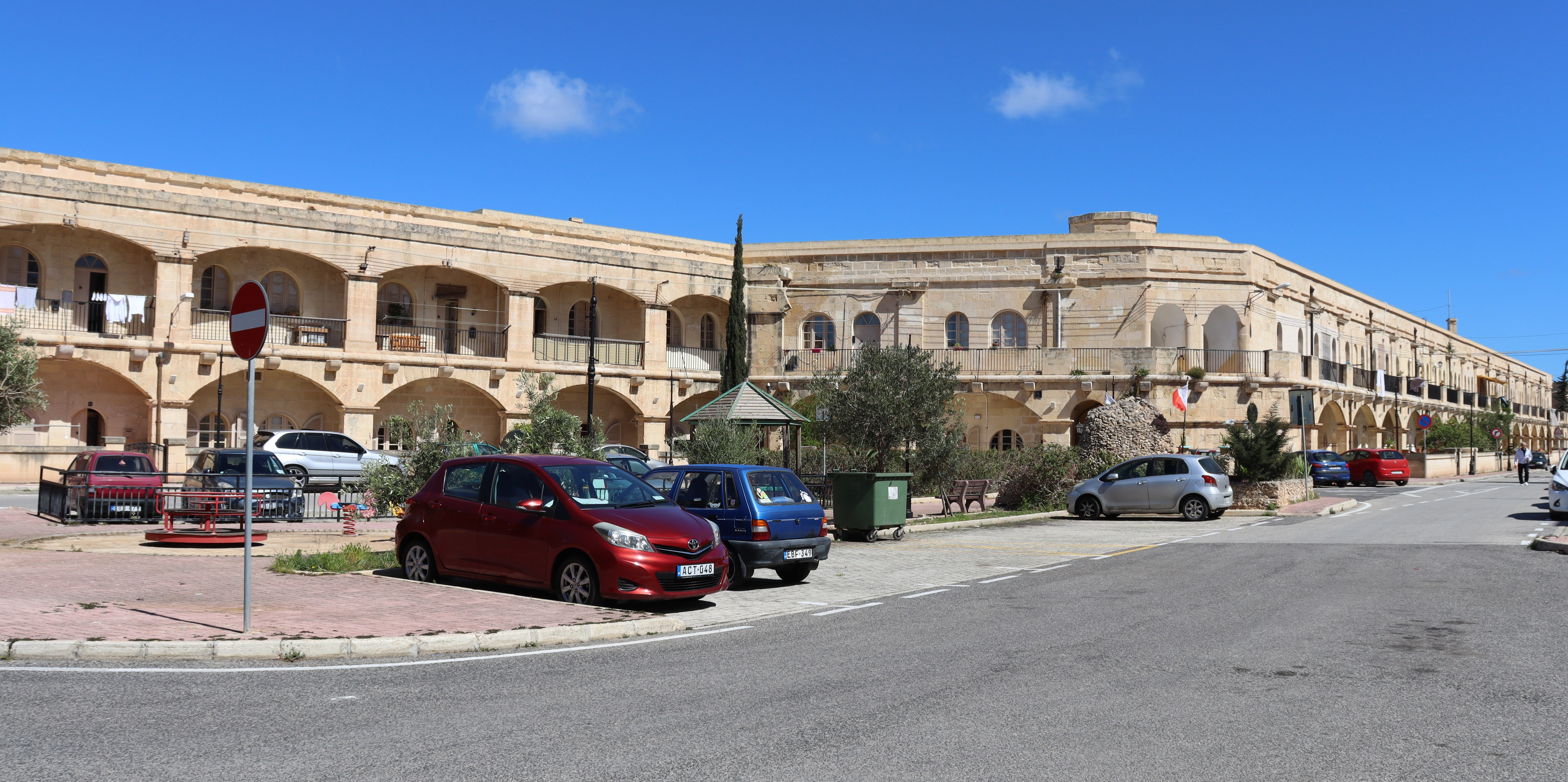
- Former barracks of Fort Verdala, seen in 2026

Site information
- Type: Fort
- Owner: Government of Malta
- Condition: Intact

Location
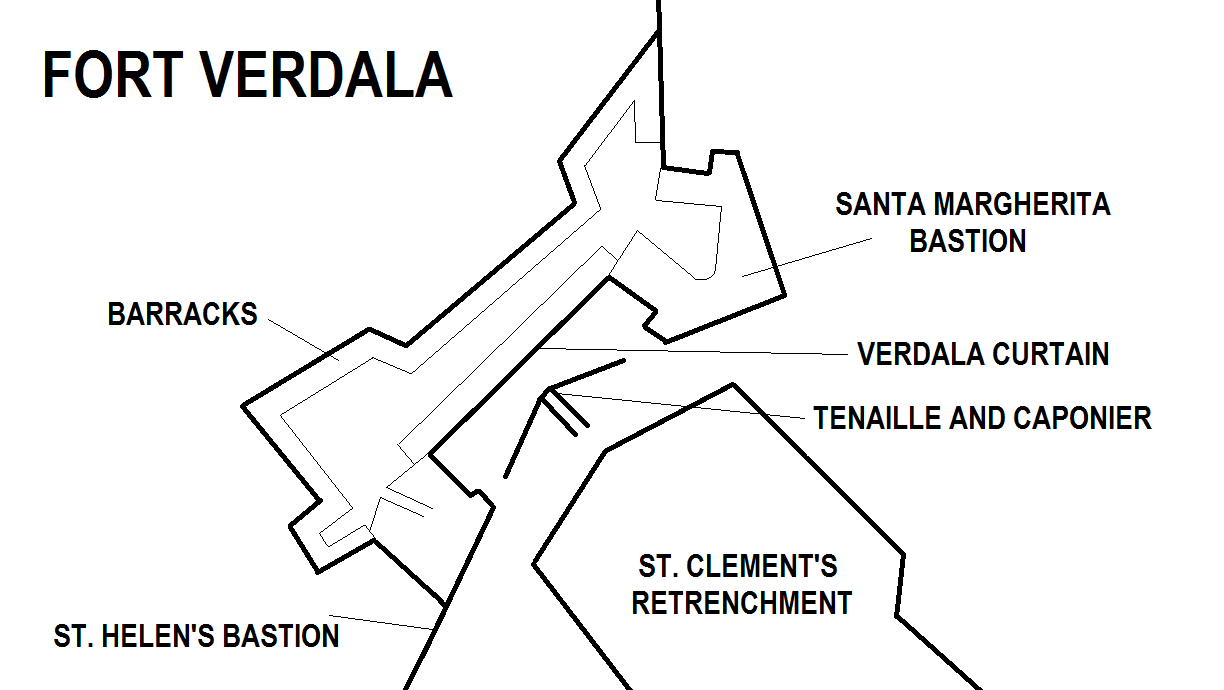
- Map of Fort Verdala
- Coordinates: 35°52′51.1″N 14°31′26.5″E

Site history
- Built: 1852–1856
- Built by: British Empire
- In use: 1856–1977
- Materials: Limestone

Fort Verdala (Maltese: Il-Fortizza Verdala), also known as Verdala Barracks, is a fortified barracks in Cospicua, Malta. It was built by the British in the 1850s within part of the bastions of the 17th century Santa Margherita Lines. The fort was used as a prisoner-of-war camp in both World Wars, and was later known as HMS Euroclydon. It remained in use by the British military until 1977.

== History ==
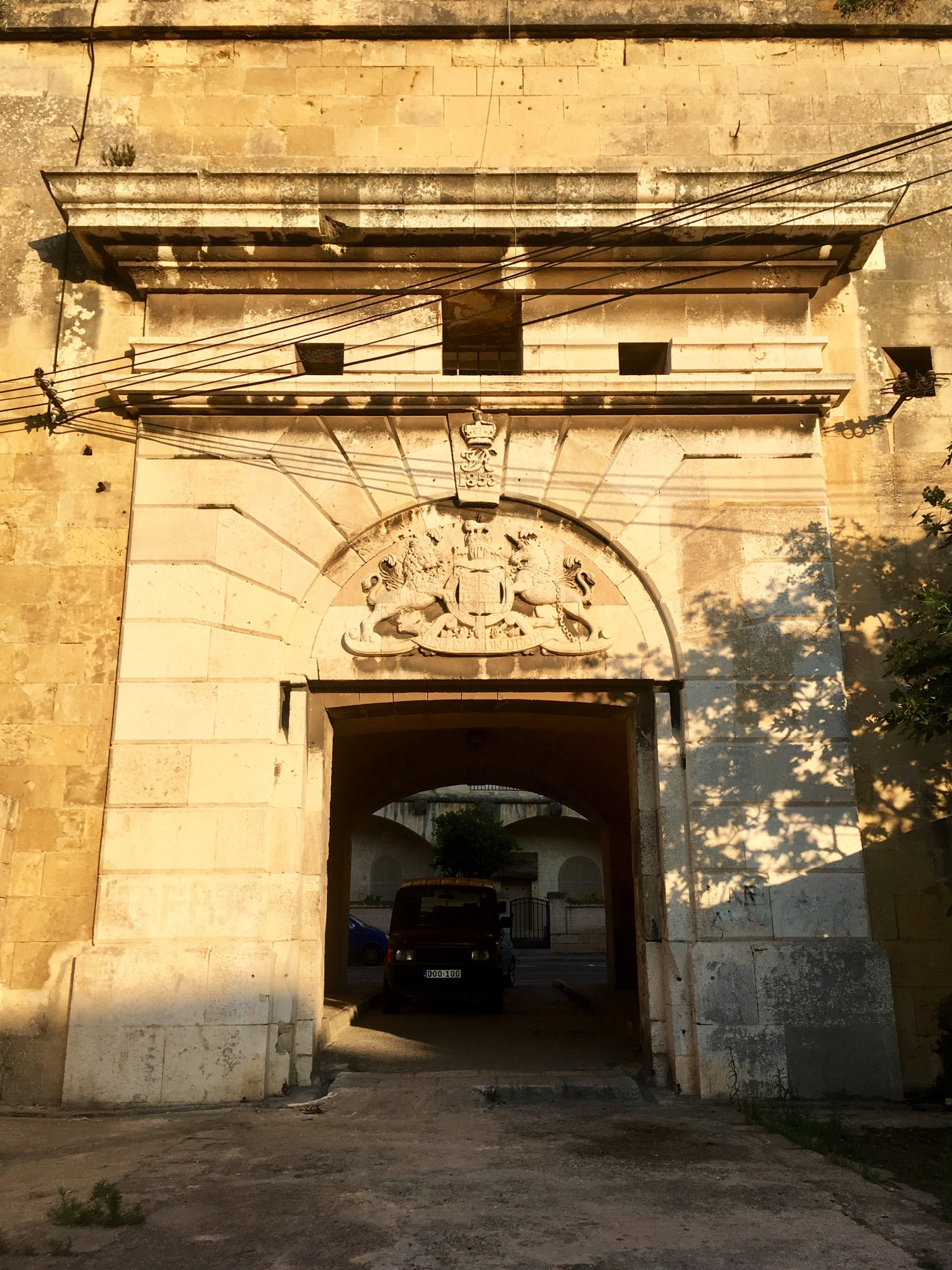
Fort Verdala main gate, with British insignia

Fort Verdala was built by the Royal Engineers between 1852 and 1856. It was built on the central part of the Santa Margherita Lines, incorporating St. Margherita Bastion and St.Helen Bastion. The fort was named after the Verdala Curtain, the curtain wall linking the two bastions. The fort itself consists of a barrack block surrounded by casemated walls, which are surrounded by a shallow ditch.

By 1886, the fort was armed with 24-pounder smooth-bore howitzers. These armaments were removed in the 1890s, when the fort was converted into a barrack complex. In World War I, it became a prisoner-of-war camp, housing captured German prisoners including Franz Joseph, Prince of Hohenzollern-Emden, Karl von Müller and Karl Dönitz. Mahmud Hasan Deobandi, an Indian Muslim activist, was interned here after the unsuccessful Silk Letter Movement against the British Raj.

In the interwar period, Fort Verdala housed the Royal Marines, before being converted into a naval store. In 1940, it was commissioned as a stone frigate with the name HMS Euroclydon, and was used as a school for children of Royal Navy personnel. The school was closed in 1943 due to the threat of aerial bombardment, and the fort became a POW camp once again. In 1945 it briefly served as a demobilisation centre, but was converted back into a naval school in 1947, housing only primary age children of Royal Navy personnel from the 1950s.

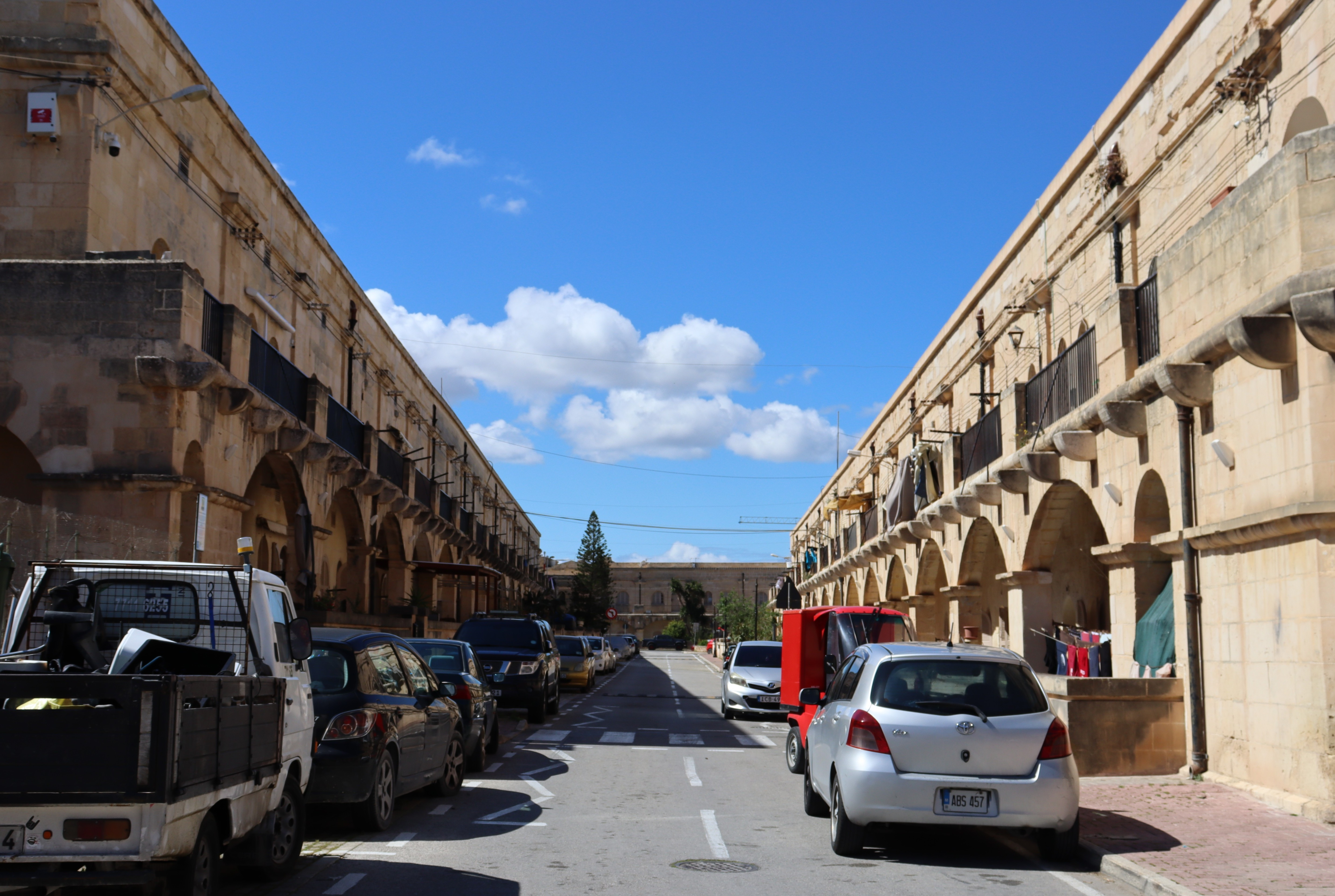
A streetview of the barracks, seen in 2026

Although it was a school, the fort continued to house navy personnel and Maltese servicemen, and occasionally members of other Commonwealth navies such as the Royal Pakistan Navy.

The fort was decommissioned and handed to the Government of Malta in 1977. It was then used by the Verdala International School, which moved to Fort Pembroke, St. Andrew's in 1987. The fort then became a state school, first as Verdala Boys’ Secondary school, and later the co-educational St Margaret College Secondary School, Verdala. The site also includes government housing units.
