= China Hospitality Technology Alliance =

Chinese non-profit organization

China Hospitality Technology Alliance (CHTA) is the largest Chinese non-profit organization for the certification of technological products and technology development for the domestic hotel industry, as well as the education and training of IT practitioners in the hotel industry.

== History ==
The China Hospitality Technology Alliance was founded by Jing Zhu. She is also the CEO of 3D Networks.

In March 2013, the China Hospitality Technology Alliance announced an alliance with the Hospitality Financial and Technology Professionals to share strategic industry information about each other's regional markets.

In September 2015, the China Hospitality Technology Alliance made a partnership with the Hospitality Financial and Technology Professionals to share resources in education and certification processes. In April 2016, the China Hospitality Technology Alliance made its first round of product certification.

== Sponsorship ==
In January 2019, the CHTA sponsored, with the China Hotel Association, the creation of the Security Response Center of China Hospitality Industry, a platform aiming to fight cyber risks in the hospitality industry.

== See also ==
- Hotel Technology Next Generation
