= Property management system =

Computerized systems to manage properties

Property Management Systems (PMS) or Hotel Operating System (HOS) are computerized software systems that facilitate the management of properties, personal property, equipment, including maintenance, legalities and personnel. They are used in businesses that cover real estate, manufacturing, logistics, intellectual property, government, or hospitality accommodation management.

== History ==
Starting in the 1980s, they replaced paper-based methods that tended to be both cumbersome and inefficient. They were often deployed as client/server configurations. By the early 2020s property management systems favored a software as a service (SaaS) model sustained by web and cloud technologies.

== Industries ==
=== Hospitality ===
The first property management systems in the hospitality industry appeared on the market in the 1980s. Today, they are considered the most important piece of hotel technology.

In hotels, a property management system, also known as a PMS, is a comprehensive software application used to cover objectives like coordinating the operational functions of the front office, sales and planning, reporting etc. The system automates hotel operations like guest bookings, guest details, online reservations, posting of charges, point of sale, telephone, accounts receivable, sales and marketing, events, food and beverage costing, materials management, human resource and payroll, maintenance management, quality management and other amenities. Hotel property management systems may have integrated or interface with third-party solutions like central reservation systems and revenue or yield management systems, online booking engine, back office, point of sale, door-locking, housekeeping optimization, pay-TV, energy management, payment card authorization and channel management systems. Modern cloud-based hospitality PMS platforms may also integrate booking engines and channel management systems. Examples include OwlNest by OwlTing Group, a hospitality property management platform launched in 2017.

With the advancement of cloud computing property management systems for hotels expand their functionality towards new service areas like guest-facing features. These include online check-in, room service, in-room controls, guest-staff communication, virtual concierge and more. These new functionalities are mainly used by guests on their own mobile devices or such provided by the hotel in lobbies and/or rooms.

=== Local government ===
Property management systems are used in local government authorities since these authorities hold and manage large property estates ranging from schools, leisure centres, social housing, and parks not to mention investment properties such as shops and industrial estates - even pubs. All of these are necessary income earners for a local authority, so the efficiency gained through an automated, computerized system is essential.

=== Manufacturing and logistics ===
Property management systems are used to manage, control and account for personal property.

Property is defined as the equipment, tooling and physical capital assets that are acquired and used to build, repair and maintain end item deliverables. Property Management involves the processes, systems and manpower required to manage the life cycle of all acquired property as defined above including Acquisition, Control, Accountability, Maintenance, Utilization, and disposition.

=== Commercial properties ===
Property Management systems allow local property managers and maintenance personnel to manage the day-to-day operations of their properties. Property maintenance for commercial properties includes major focus areas such as risk management, maintenance, communication, and tenant satisfaction. Usually a certain agreed percentage of the rent payment will be deducted on each rent payment collected by the property management as their service fee. There are also other ways of charging the property owners using the service but percentage collection is the common one.

== Types ==
There are two broad types of property management system: cloud-based software and on-premises software. A cloud-based property management system does not require a software license for each device. It is not physically installed on every computer like a traditional software. Instead, a login ID and password is given once the software is purchased. The software can be accessed on any device with an active internet connection.

On-premises software is installed physically on every system with a unique software license. Data is stored in a remote server within the property.

== See also ==
- Hotel Technology Next Generation
- Hotel reservation system
- Computer reservation system
- Computer-aided facility management
- Property Management
  - Property Management Software
