= OpenTravel Alliance =

Trade association

- Formation: 1999

The OpenTravel Alliance is a not-for-profit trade association founded in 1999.

== Mission ==
OpenTravel's mission is to engineer specifications to ensure traveler and supplier information flow smoothly throughout travel, tourism and hospitality. OpenTravel creates, expands and drives adoption of open specifications, including but not limited to the use of XML, for the electronic exchange of business information among all sectors of the travel industry. OpenTravel's schema design supports W3C, IATA and ISO standards.

Members of the OpenTravel Alliance include airlines, hotel companies, car rental companies, cruise lines, railways, global distribution systems, distribution companies, solutions providers, software developers and consultants.

== History ==
OpenTravel was founded in 1999 by a consortium of travel companies - including air, hotel, car rental, and supporting software companies - with a primary focus on the creation of electronic message structures to facilitate communication between the disparate systems in the global travel industry. The OpenTravel Alliance presented their concepts at its first OpenTravel Advisory Forum meeting on May 25, 1999, in Atlanta, Georgia.

The driving force behind the adoption of an XML standard throughout the travel industry was the hopes of eliminating one of the major impediments blocking a full conversion to electronic tickets. Before the creation of OpenTravel messaging, passengers who with electronic tickets had to wait in line to receive a paper ticket from their initial airline if a flight has been canceled and they want to try to switch to another carrier. In addition, airline employees would need to fill out a handwritten "flight interruption manifest" for each ticketholder who's looking to rebook elsewhere. The adoption of an industry-standard setup based on XML allowed electronic tickets to be automatically transferred to another airline's system.

In May 2017, OpenTravel added messaging to facilitate reserving golf tee times. Called the OpenTravel Golf 2.0 Standard Connection, the addition allowed golf courses to connect directly with distribution partners in hospitality, air, rental cars, tour operators, OTA's, rail, by enabling faster, more efficient technical connections.

In March 2016, the OpenTravel Alliance announced the release of OTA 2.0 object model solution, the next generation of open source messaging for consumer direct bookings. OpenTravel's 2.0 adds the ability to exchange JSON messaging to the existing XML capabilities. Version 1 of the specification was first released for public review in February 2000.

== See also ==
- Travel technology
- Travel Sentry
- Open source
