= Calvert Jones =

Welsh mathematician and painter (1804–1877)

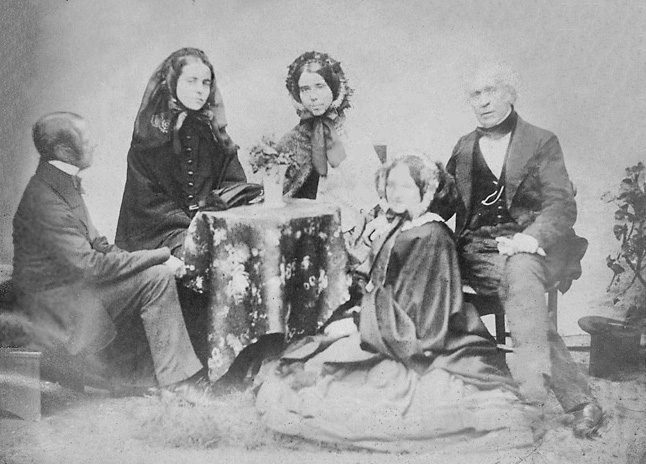
Calvert Richard Jones, Lady Brewster, Mrs. Jones, Sir David Brewster and Miss Parnell (seated).

Calvert Richard Jones (4 December 1804 – 7 November 1877) was a Welsh mathematician and painter, best known for his seascapes.

== Life and work ==
Jones belonged to a wealthy Swansea family. He was educated at Eton and Oriel College, Oxford, and was rector of Loughor. He was a friend of both John Dillwyn Llewelyn and Christopher Rice Mansel Talbot, and thus moved in the same circles as Henry Fox Talbot. Jones is credited with having taken the first photograph in Wales, a daguerreotype of Margam Castle, in 1841, but he did not take up photography as a regular occupation. During the 1840s and 1850s, however, he took many photographs of the Swansea area, and travelled with his camera in France, Italy and Malta. He also developed his own technique for taking panoramic photographs by overlapping images.

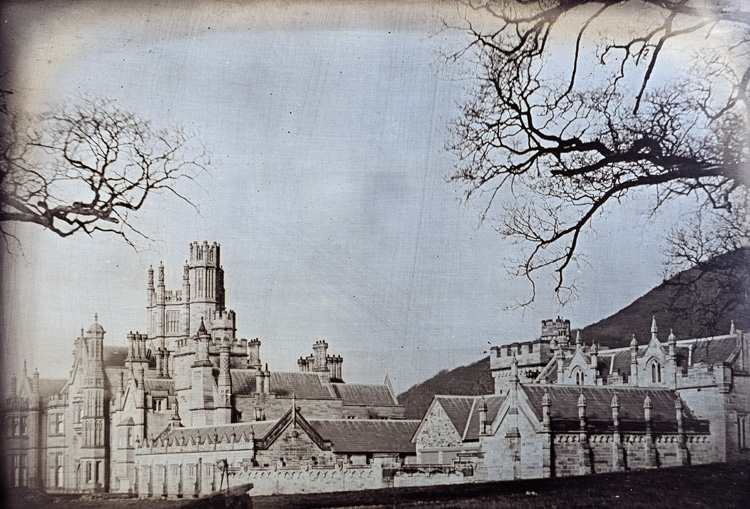
Jones's daguerreotype of Margam Castle

In 1847 he inherited the Heathfield estate in Swansea, which he developed, naming Mansel Street (which still stands) after his brother. In 1853, he went to live in Brussels, later returning to Britain and settling in Bath. He died in Bath, but was buried in Swansea, at St Mary's Church; the grave was destroyed during World War II.
