= Hospitality management =

Hospitality management may refer to:

- Hotel management occupation, the practice of running hotels
- Hospitality industry management positions
- Hospitality management studies, the academic study of the running of hotels, restaurants, and travel and tourism-related business.

== See also ==
- Hospitality (disambiguation)
