= Hotel manager =

Person managing a hotel

Occupation
- Names: Hotel manager, General manager, hotelier
- Activity sectors: Hospitality management, Business

Description
- Competencies: Operations management Team building Advanced knowledge of hotel operations Human resources management Financial management Sales management Events management Marketing; Revenue management Customer relationship management
- Fields of employment: Hotels

The general manager of Mercure Hotel in Hannover.

A hotel manager is a person who leads and administers the operation of a hotel, motel, resort, or other lodging-related establishment. Management of a hotel operation includes, but is not limited to: management of hotel staff, business management, upkeep and sanitary standards of hotel facilities, guest satisfaction and customer service, marketing management, sales management, revenue management, financial accounting, purchasing, and other functions. The title "hotel manager" or "hotelier" often refers to the hotel's general manager who serves as a hotel's head executive, though their duties and responsibilities vary depending on the hotel's size, purpose, and expectations from ownership. The hotel's general manager is often supported by subordinate department managers that are responsible for individual departments and key functions of the hotel operations.

== Terminology ==
The position may also be called hotelier, motel manager or lodging manager.

== Management structure ==
The size and complexity of a hotel management organizational structure varies significantly depending on the size, features, and function of the hotel or resort. A small hotel operation normally may consist of a small core management team consisting of a hotel manager and a few key department supervisors who directly handle day-to-day operations. On the other hand, a large full-service hotel or resort complex often operates more similarly to a large corporation with an executive board headed by the general manager and consisting of key directors serving as heads of individual hotel departments. Each department at the large hotel or resort complex may normally consist of subordinate line-level managers and supervisors who handle day-to-day operations.

=== Large hotel or resort ===
A typical organizational chart for a large resort hotel operation may often resemble the following:

General manager reports to a regional vice president and/or ownership/investors

- General manager or managing director

 ** Assistant general manager or resident manager
 ** Director of operations or rooms division
 *** Director of front office or front office manager
 **** Front desk manager (shift manager)
 **** Bell captain
 **** Chief concierge
 **** Valet captain or parking manager
 **** PBX/communications manager
 **** Overnight manager or head night auditor
 *** Director of housekeeping or executive housekeeper
 **** Assistant director of housekeeping or executive housekeeper
 **** Floor manager (shift manager)
 **** Laundry manager
 *** Director of revenue management or revenue manager
 **** Reservations manager
 *** Director of sales & marketing
 **** Senior sales manager
 ***** Leisure sales manager
 ***** Business travel sales manager
 ***** Social group sales manager
 ***** Corporate group sales manager
 **** Marketing manager
 **** Social media manager
 **** Public relations manager
 *** Director of food & beverage
 **** Restaurant manager
 **** Assistant restaurant manager
 **** Executive chef
 **** Room service manager
 **** Butlers manager
 **** Club manager
 **** Bar & lounge manager
 **** Banquets manager
 *** Director of group and events
 **** Assistant director of events
 **** Convention services manager
 **** Event manager
 **** Catering manager
 *** Director of finance
 **** Accounting manager
 **** Payroll manager
 **** Purchasing manager
 *** Director of engineering
 **** Chief engineer
 **** Maintenance manager
 **** Facilities manager
 *** Director of human resources
 **** Human Resources manager
 **** Recruiting manager
 **** Training manager
 **** Labor relations manager (for unionized hotels)
 *** Chief of security
 *** Recreation manager
 *** Information technology manager

Additional management positions may exist for additional facilities such as hotel-owned golf courses, casinos, or spas.

=== Small hotel ===
A hotel manager in Sri Lanka.

A typical organizational chart for a small low-rise hotel operation may resemble the following:

Hotel manager reports to regional director and/or ownership/investors

- General manager

 ** Guest service manager (front of house)
 ** Housekeeping manager
 ** Chief engineer
 ** Sales & marketing manager
 ** Food & beverage manager
 ** Account manager
 Administrative functions for a small-scale hotel such as accounting, payroll, and human resources may normally be handled by a centralized corporate office or solely by the hotel manager. Additional auxiliary functions such as security may be handled by third-party vendor services contracted by the hotel on an as-needed basis. Hotel management is necessary to implement standard operating procedures and actions as well as handling day-to-day operations.

=== Motel ===
A typical motel organizational chart may resemble the following:

- Motel Manager

 ** Restaurant Manager or Chef
 ** Housekeeping Manager
 ** Housekeepers
 ** Maintenance is completed by the on-site manager, maintenance officer or a tradesman.
 ** Receptionist

In a small motel, the motel manager's role is hands-on, often with daily engagement in housekeeping, maintenance and reception.

== Qualifications ==
The background and training required varies by the type of management position, size of operation, and duties involved. Industry experience has proven to be a basic qualification for nearly any management occupation within the lodging industry. A BS and a MS degree in Hospitality Management/or an equivalent Business degree is often strongly preferred by most employers in the industry but not always required.

A higher level graduate degree may be desired for a general manager type position, but is often not required with sufficient management experience and industry tenure. A graduate degree may however be required for a higher level corporate executive position or above such as a Regional Vice President who oversees multiple hotel properties and general managers.

== Working conditions ==
Hotel managers are generally exposed to long shifts that include late hours, weekends, and holidays due to the 24-hour operation of a hotel. The common workplace environment in hotels is fast-paced, with high levels of interaction with guests, employees, investors, and other managers.

Upper management consisting of senior managers, department heads, and general managers may sometimes enjoy a more desirable work schedule consisting of a more traditional business day with occasional weekends and holidays off.

Depending on the size of the hotel, a typical hotel manager's day may include assisting with operational duties, managing employee performance, handling dissatisfied guests, managing work schedules, purchasing supplies, interviewing potential job candidates, conducting physical walks and inspections of the hotel facilities and public areas, and additional duties. These duties may vary each day depending on the needs of the property. The manager's responsibility also includes knowing about all current local events as well as the events being held on the hotel property. Managers are often required to attend regular department meetings, management meetings, training seminars for professional development, and additional functions. A hotel/casino property may require additional duties regarding special events being held on property for casino complimentary guests.

=== 2020 coronavirus pandemic ===
Working conditions were increasingly difficult during the 2020 coronavirus pandemic. One CEO of a major hotel owner, Monty Bennett of Ashford Inc., told CBS News that he had to lay off or furlough 95% of his 7,000 U.S. workers. To save money, hotel management are compelled to reduce all discretionary operational and capital costs, and review or postpone maintenance and other capital investments whenever possible. By the second week of the major outbreak of the virus in the U.S., the industry asked Congress for $250 billion in bailouts for owners and employees because of financial setbacks and mass layoffs.

== Salary ==
The median annual wage in 2015 of the 48,400 lodging managers in the United States was $49,720.
