= Vincenzo Maculani =

Italian Cardinal, inquisitor and military architect

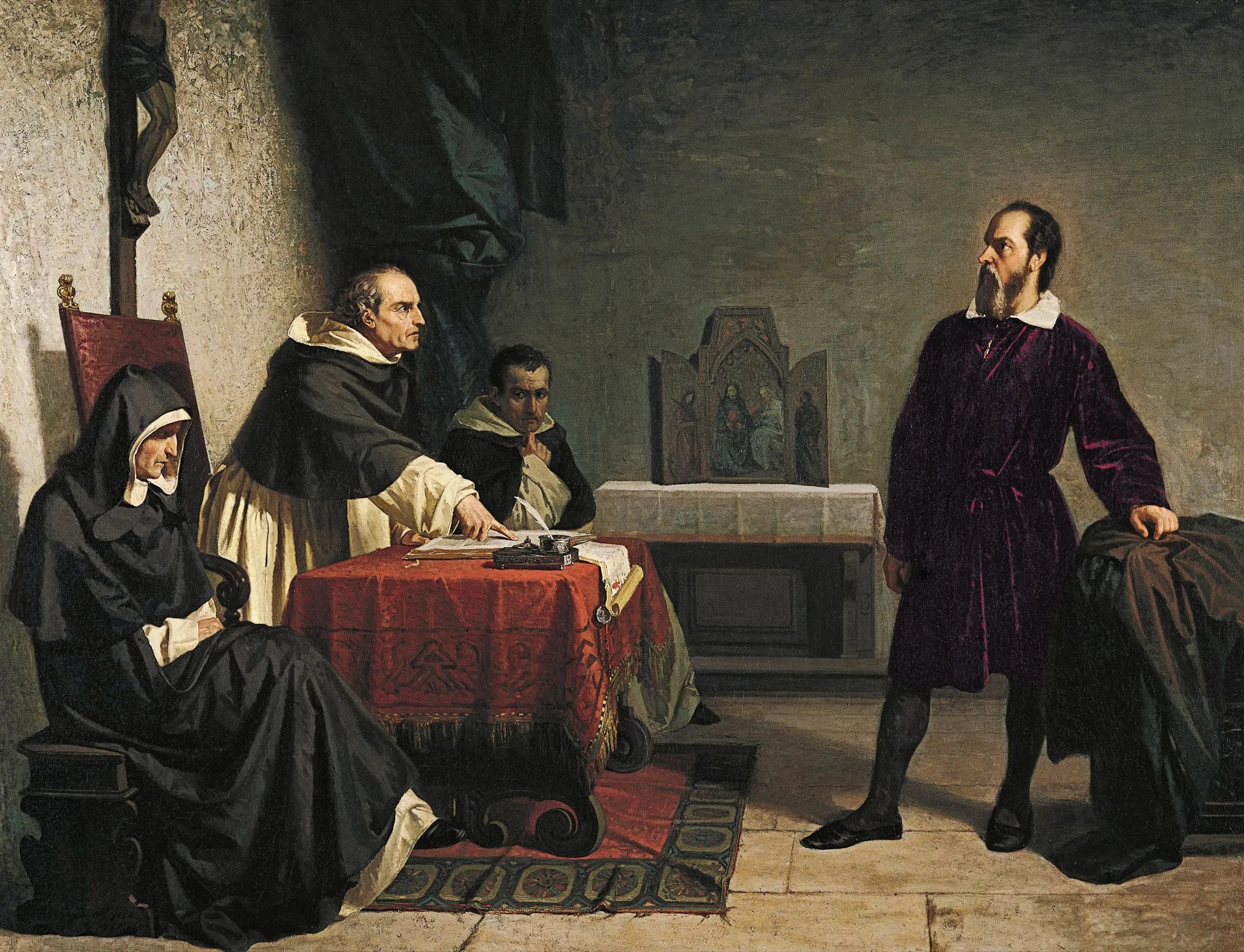
Maculani (in priestly vestments) reading the charges against Galileo Galilei (standing), by Cristiano Banti (1857).

Vincenzo Maculani (11 September 1578 – 16 February 1667) was an Italian Catholic Cardinal, inquisitor and military architect. He was known as a severe man, harsh and without compassion, who preferred the black cappa of his order to the brighter red he was later entitled to wear as a cardinal.

== Early life ==
Maculani was born Gaspare Maculani on 11 September 1578 at Fiorenzuola d'Arda. He trained as a bricklayer (his father's profession) before entering the Order of Preachers in Pavia in 1594 and changing his name to Vincenzo.

He studied in Bologna, becoming a lector of theology and canon law but also of practical geometry and architecture. He was appointed as an Inquisitor in Padua in 1627 and in Genoa from 1627 to 1629. While he was in Genoa he was also given the task of rebuilding the city's wall, along with Giovanni Battista Baliani. Parts of Genoa's new walls remain standing today.

== The Inquisition ==
Thereafter, Maculani was called to Rome by Pope Urban VIII, who named him procurator-general of his order during a visit to France. He became an inquisitor (the official title being Commissary General) under Urban's Cardinal-Nephew; Grand Inquisitor of the Roman Inquisition, Francesco Barberini.

After Galileo Galilei's falling out with Pope Urban VIII, Maculani conducted the first interview with the scientist (on 12 April 1633); the inquiry was conducted in Fra Vincenzo's chambers at the Palace of the Inquisition in Rome. This was the first stage in Galileo's trial and persecution by the Inquisition. Maculani personally delivered the report of the First Examination to Pope Urban VIII and the Cardinals on 27 April 1633 Maculani also presided at the Third Examination on 10 May 1633. Urban VIII ordered a Fourth Examination, to inquire into Galileo's 'intent' in publishing his Dialogue, and specifically authorized Maculani to threaten to use torture. However, while Maculani was generally cold and uncaring, it was he who determined that Galileo was too old and too ill to endure torture.

== Architecture in Rome ==
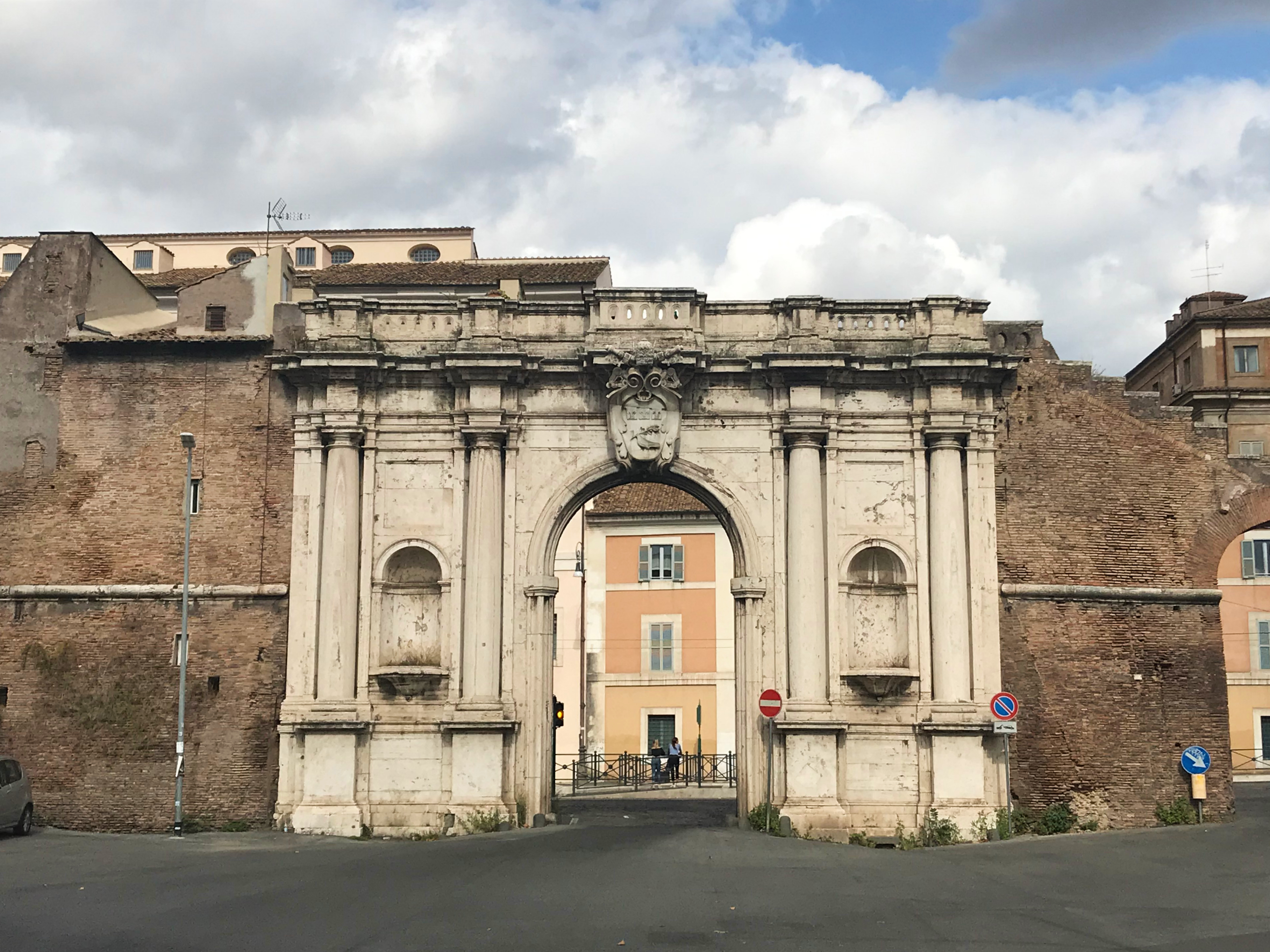
The Porta Portese; commissioned by Pope Urban VIII and constructed by Maculani.

Once in the service of Pope Urban, Maculani was tasked with overseeing the Pope's vast military-centric building program.

First, Maculani added fortifications (including moats and ramparts) to the Castel Sant'Angelo. He then constructed defences around the gardens of the Cortile del Belvedere and the Porta Cavalleggeri (and its nearby church).

Maculani also constructed walls at Lungara (within the Trastevere) and the Janiculum and extended them to the priory on the Aventine Hill. The walls included the Porta Portese which was finally completed in 1644.

In 1639, Pope Urban VIII promoted Fra Vincenzo to the post of Maestro dei Sacri Palazzi. This position gave him the responsibility of reviewing every book presented for publication in Rome, and the power of granting, or not granting, the imprimatur.

== Wars of Castro ==
During the Wars of Castro, Pope Urban again put Maculani's architectural skills to good use - he was sent ahead of papal forces (led by Antonio Barberini and Luigi Mattei) to oversee the fortification of various towns, palaces and castles under threat from the forces of the Dukes of Parma. Contemporary John Bargrave suggested his work put him in good stead with the Pope and his family, the Barberini, but made him incredibly unpopular with the people and with local nobles. This included the Mattei (rather ironic, given one of their sons was leading papal forces) who lost half a villa to the construction of fortifications.

== Cardinalate ==
Maculani was elevated to the Cardinalate on 16 December 1641 and was appointed Cardinal-Priest of the Basilica di San Clemente in 1642. He was elected Archbishop of Benevento in that year and was consecrated in the Sistine Chapel by Cardinal Antonio Marcello Barberini, brother of Pope Urban VIII.

In 1643, he was recalled to Rome to serve the Pope and resigned his archdiocese but Urban VIII died in 1644. Maculani participated in the papal conclave of 1644 which elected Pope Innocent X. In the middle of the Conclave, after the first candidate proposed by the Barberini faction, Cardinal Giulio Cesare Sacchetti, had failed to win enough support, Maculani was offered as a candidate. But he had enemies, including Fra Michele Mazarin, OP, the brother of Cardinal Mazarin. He did not, therefore, have the support of the French faction. Again recognising his architectural skills, the new Pope sent him to Malta to oversee construction of the new fortifications for the island, in particular the Lascaris towers. Upon his return he continued work on the Castel Sant'Angelo and the walls started during Urban's reign.

He was elected Camerlengo of the Sacred College of Cardinals for the year 1652 and 1653 He participated in the Papal conclave of 1655 which elected Pope Alexander VII.

Maculani died on 16 February 1667 and was buried at the Basilica of Saint Sabina at the Aventine.

== Depiction in fiction ==
Maculani is a recurring character in the Ring of Fire alternative history hypernovel by Eric Flint et al. where he is depicted as a henchman of renegade Cardinal and eventual anti-pope Gaspar de Borja y Velasco. This is primarily in the South European thread books: 1634: The Galileo Affair, 1635: The Cannon Law, 1635: The Papal Stakes, and 1636: The Vatican Sanction.

Records
Preceded by Alfonso de la Cueva-Benavides y Mendoza-Carrillo	Oldest living Member of the Sacred College; 10 August 1655 - 14 February 1667	Succeeded by Marzio Ginetti
