= Corradino Campisi =

- Born: 1948; Italy
- Citizenship: Italian
- Occupation: Professor

Corradino Campisi is a professor at the Ospedale San Martino and chief editor of the European Journal of Lymphology and Related Problems. He is also a member of the editorial board of the European Journal of Lymphology and Related Problems He is also a member of the editorial board of Vascular Medicine.

== Early life and education ==
Campisi was born in 1948 in Italy. He graduated with a degree in Medicine and Surgery (MD), with Honours from the School of Medicine, University of Genoa. In 1976, he did specialty degree in Vascular Surgery, with Honours from University of Genoa. In 1981, he completed a degree in General Surgery, with Honours from the University of Genoa. In 1986, he completed a specialty degree in Trauma surgery and First Aid, with Honours from the University of Modena.

== Career ==
Campisi joined University of Genoa as an associate professor in 1980. In 2005, he became a professor at the University of Genoa. Later, he joined Ospedale San Martino University as a professor in the department of surgery, Operative Unit of Lymphatic surgery. At the same time, he joined as a consultant in charge of the department, National Institute For Cancer Research under IRCCS University Hospital San Martino.

From 1994 to 1998, Campisi served as the Assistant Editor of the European Journal of Lymphology and Related Problems (EJLRP) and in 1999, he became Editor-in-chief of the journal. In 1997, he founded Clinica Chirurgica e Microchirurgia – Clinical and Investigative Microsurgery, Multispecialty Microsurgery Journal (Turin, Milan). From 2001 to 2012, he served as the Coordinator of the International Scientific Committee of the Journal Linfologia Oggi and, later, of La Linfologia Italiana.

Campisi was a member of the editorial board for the Journal Angeiologie, the official journal of the French Angiology Society. He is also a member of the editorial board for the Annals of Plastic Surgery and International Angiology, the official Journal of the International Union of Angiology.

Campisi's teaching career includes Scripps Mercy Hospital, San Diego, California where he was a member of the International Research Advisory Board of the San Diego Microsurgical Institute & Training Center. From 1999 to 2017, he served as a Professor H.C. in Medicine and Surgery, School of Medicine, Valença, Rio de Janeiro, Brazil. He also served as an external consultant in Phlebology and Lymphology at the Argentinian university of John Fitzgerald Kennedy- Escuela de Graduados, Buenos Aires, Argentina.

== Recognition ==
- 1973 – Lepetit award for Best Experimental Laurea Degree Dissertation
- July 4, 1980 to July 31, 1986 – Secretary General of Italian Physical Society.
- July 31, 1986 to July 12, 1997 – Vice-president of the Società Italiana di Linfangiologia (SIL).
- June 1993 – awarded the Order of Merit of the Italian Republic.
- 2017 – President of Società Italiana dei Chirurghi Universitari (SICU).

== Recent publications ==
- Campisi CC, Spinaci S, Lavagno R, Larcher L, Boccardo F, Santi P, Campisi C. Immunodeficiency due to chylous dysplasia: diagnostic and therapeutic considerations. Lymphology 2012 June;45:5862.
- Gianesini, Sergio; Obi, Andrea; Onida, Sarah; Baccellieri, Domenico; Bissacco, Daniele; Borsuk, Denis; Campisi, Corradino (2019). "Global guidelines trends and controversies in lower limb venous and lymphatic disease: Narrative literature revision and experts' opinions following the vWINter international meeting in Phlebology, Lymphology & Aesthetics, 23-25 January 2019". Phlebology. 34 (1_suppl): 4–66. doi:10.1177/0268355519870690. hdl:10044/1/74062. ISSN 1758-1125. PMID 31495256.
- Villa, G.; Campisi, C. C. (2019). "Procedural Recommendations for Lymphoscintigraphy in the Diagnosis of Peripheral Lymphedema: the Genoa Protocol". Nuclear Medicine and Molecular Imaging. 53 (1): 47–56. doi:10.1007/s13139-018-0565-2. ISSN 1869-3474. PMC 6377575. PMID 30828401.
- Campisi, Corradino; Ryan, Melissa; Villa, Giuseppe (2019). "Rationale for Study of the Deep Subfascial Lymphatic Vessels During Lymphoscintigraphy for the Diagnosis of Peripheral Lymphedema". Clinical Nuclear Medicine. 44 (2): 91–98. doi:10.1097/RLU.0000000000002400. ISSN 1536-0229. PMID 30516673.
- Dessalvi, S.; Villa, G.; Boccardo, F.; Campisi, C. (2018). "Decreasing and preventing lymphatic-injury-related complications in patients undergoing venous surgery: A new diagnostic and therapeutic protocol". Lymphology. 51 (2): 57–65. ISSN 2522-7963. PMID 30253456.
- Campisi, Corrado C.; Boccardo, Francesco; Piazza, Cesare; Campisi, Corradino (2013). "Evolution of chylous fistula management after neck dissection". Current Opinion in Otolaryngology & Head and Neck Surgery. 21 (2): 150–156. doi:10.1097/MOO.0b013e32835e9d97. ISSN 1531-6998. PMID 23449286.
- Campisi, Corrado C.; Larcher, Lorenz; Lavagno, Rosalia; Spinaci, Stefano; Adami, Michaela; Boccardo, Francesco; Santi, Pierluigi; Campisi, Corradino (November 2012). "Microsurgical primary prevention of lymphatic injuries following breast cancer treatment". Plastic and Reconstructive Surgery. 130 (5): 749e – 750e, author reply 750e–751e. doi:10.1097/PRS.0b013e318267d906. ISSN 1529-4242. PMID 23096640.
- Boccardo, Francesco; Campisi, Corrado Cesare; Molinari, Lidia; Dessalvi, Sara; Santi, Pier Luigi; Campisi, Corradino (2012). "Lymphatic complications in surgery: possibility of prevention and therapeutic options". Updates in Surgery. 64 (3): 211–216. doi:10.1007/s13304-012-0165-0. ISSN 2038-131X. PMID 22821181.
