= Corradino =

Corradino may refer to:

== Given name ==
- Corradino Campisi (born 1948), Italian medical academic
- Corradino D'Ascanio (1891–1981), Italian aeronautical engineer
- Corradino Mineo (born 1950), Italian journalist and politician

=== Fictional ===
- Corradino, Cuor di ferro, hero of Rossini's opera Matilde di Shabran

== Surname ==
- Claudio Corradino (born 1959), Italian politician

== Other ==
- Corradino Batteries, series of artillery batteries on Corradino Heights, near Paola, Malta
- Corradino Lines, line of fortification on Corradino in Paola, Malta
- Corradino prison, Paola, Malta
