= Waldemar Olszewski =

Polish lymphologist (1931–2020)

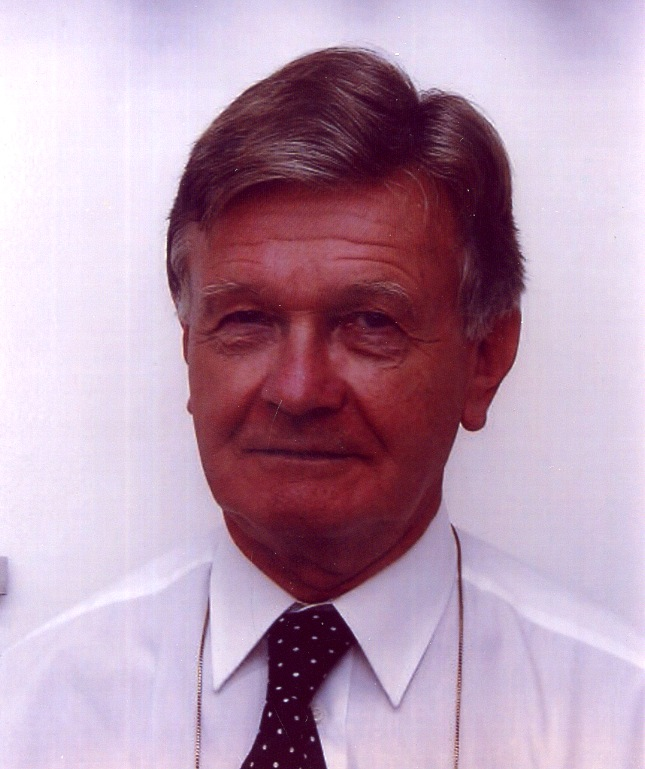
Prof. Waldemar Olszewski

Waldemar Lech Olszewski (3 September 1931 – 8 November 2020) was a Polish lymphologist. His main area of study was the human lymphatic system. Clinical and research interests comprise vascular surgery, transplantation, physiology and surgery of the lymphatic system and immunology. He discovered fundamental processes in human tissues connected with function of the lymphatic system.

Olszewski published around 600 publications, seven scientific books and is a member of numerous medical bodies.

== Early life ==
Waldemar Lech Olszewski was born on 3 September 1931 in Piastów, Warsaw, Poland into a family of landowners, his father was a linguist and a banking specialist. He received his General Certificate of Education in 1948 in Warsaw and undertook university studies, first in the Faculty of Law, Warsaw University from 1948 to 1950 and then in the Faculty of Medicine at Warsaw University. Graduating in 1954, Olszewski passed the Board in Surgery exams in 1962 and received his PhD in 1962 and D.Science in 1968.

From 1970 Olszewski was an associate professor at the Department of Surgery, the Medical Academy, and the Medical Research Center at Polish Academy of Sciences in Warsaw. In 1978 he was made a full professor at the same centers, and chairman of the Clinical Department of Surgery, Ministry of Internal Affaires/Polish Academy of Science Hospital, Warsaw.

Olszewski later worked at the Medical Research Center, Polish Academy of Sciences (Head of Dept) and Ministry of Internal Affaires Clinical Hospital, Warsaw, Poland (Chief Consultant).

Olszewski was the father of one daughter. He died on 8 November 2020, at the age of 89.

== Research ==
Olszewski received postgraduate training and carried out research studies at Hammersmith Hospital, London from 1962 to 1963, then at Harvard Medical School in Boston, United States of America, from 1968 to 1970. He worked at City Hospital, Warsaw, and then Dept. of Surgery, Medical Academy, and Medical Research Center, Warsaw as head of Dept. of Surgical Research & Transplantation and since 1997 as Chief of Clinical Department of Surgery, Ministry of Internal Affaires/Polish Academy of Sciences Hospital, Warsaw. Other professional positions include Visiting Professor at Radiumhospitalet, Oslo, (since 1976-), St. Bartholomew's Medical School, London (since 1994-), Research Officer World Health Organization, Madras-Pondicherry-Benares, India (since 1992-).

- Served as President of European Society for Surgical Research in 1977-78
- President of International Society of Lymphology in 1989-91
- President of Polish Society for Immunology in 1995-98

Olszewski served as a member of editorial boards of many international medical journals, including:

- Lymphology (USA)
- International Angiology (GB)
- Central European Journal of Immunology (Poland)
- Phlebolinfologia (Spain)
- Cell Transplantation (USA)
- Lymphatic Research and Biology (USA)
- US-Chinese Journal of Lymphology and Oncology (China)
- Indian Medical Research (India)
- Annals of Transplantation (Poland).

Main scientific contributions include designing and introducing into clinical practice the surgical lympho-venous shunts (1966), discovery of spontaneous rhythmic lymphatic contractility in humans (1980), proving that bacterial factor is responsible for development of human limb lymphedema (1994), introducing low-dose, long-term penicillin administration for prevention of chronic dermatitis and lymphangitis in Asian countries (1996), detecting the phenomenon of non-specific elimination of cell grafts (1990), preservation of tissues for transplantation in dehydrating sodium chloride (2003).

== Awards and honors ==
- 1975 International Society of Lymphology (USA)
- 2005 Doctor Honoris Causa Universita di Genova, Italy
- 2006 National Lymphedema Network USA
- 2006 Lymphatic Research Foundation NIH (USA)
- 2006 Polish Academy of Sciences
- 2007 American Society of Lymphology USA
- 2012 Deutsche Gesellschaft fur Phlebologie Ratschow Medal
- 2013 Bene Merito Medal - by Polish Foreign Ministry for contribution to world medicine
- 2013 Theodor Bilharz Research Institute
- Awards of the Czech Medical Society-Purkynie Medal
- Italian Surgical-Society-Carlo Erba medal

Honorary member of:

- The Society of Polish Surgeons
- Polish Transplantation Society
- Japanese Surgical Society
- Korean Medical Society
- Argentinian Medical Society
- Italian Society of Lymphology
- Brazilian Society of Angiology

== Books ==
- Olszewski WL (1984). CRC Handbook of Microsurgery. Vol. 1, 2. Boca Raton: CRC Press. ISBN 978-0-8493-3920-2.
- Olszewski WL (1985). Peripheral lymph: formation and immune function. Boca Raton: CRC Press. ISBN 978-0-8493-6137-1.
- Olszewski WL (1987). In vivo Migration of Immune Cells. Boca Raton: CRC Press. ISBN 978-0-8493-5076-4.
- Olszewski WL (1991). Lymph Stasis: Pathophysiology, Diagnosis, and Treatment. Boca Raton: CRC Press. ISBN 978-0-8493-6499-0.
- Olszewski WL (2011). "Pathology and Histochemistry". In Rockson SG, Lee BB, Bergan JJ (eds.). Lymphedema: A Concise Compendium of Theory and Practice. Berlin: Springer. ISBN 978-0-85729-566-8.
