= Vascular Medicine (journal) =

- Discipline: Vascular Medicine
- Language: English
- Edited by: Heather L. Gornik, MD

Publication details
- History: 1990-present
- Publisher: SAGE Publications
- Frequency: Bi-monthly
- Impact factor: 4.737 (2021)

Standard abbreviations
- ISO 4: Vasc. Med.

Indexing
- ISSN: 1358-863X (print); 1477-0377 (web)
- LCCN: sv97002064
- OCLC no.: 42663318

Links
- Journal homepage; Online access; Online archive

Vascular Medicine is the premier ISI-ranked, peer-reviewed academic journal of vascular medicine comprising original research articles and reviews on vascular biology, epidemiology, diagnosis, medical treatment, and interventional therapy for vascular disease. The journal's editor is Dr. Heather L. Gornik (University Hospitals, Cleveland, OH), one of the top-ranking FMD specialists in the county. It has been in publication since 1990 and is currently published by SAGE Publications on behalf of the Society for Vascular Medicine. This journal is a member of the Committee on Publication Ethics (COPE).

== Scope ==
Vascular Medicine publishes original research articles and reviews on vascular biology, epidemiology, diagnosis, medical treatment and interventions for vascular disease. The journal aims to advance the field of vascular medicine by publishing reports of the latest research in vascular biology, integrated with the practice of vascular medicine and vascular surgery.

== Abstracting and indexing ==
Vascular Medicine is abstracted and indexed in PubMed: MEDLINE, among other databases. According to the 2019 Journal Citation Reports, its impact factor is 2.832, ranking it 28 out of 65 journals in the category "Peripheral Vascular Disease".
