= Cottonera Lines =

Line of fortifications in Malta

- Is-Swar tal-Kottonera
- Cospicua and Birgu, Malta
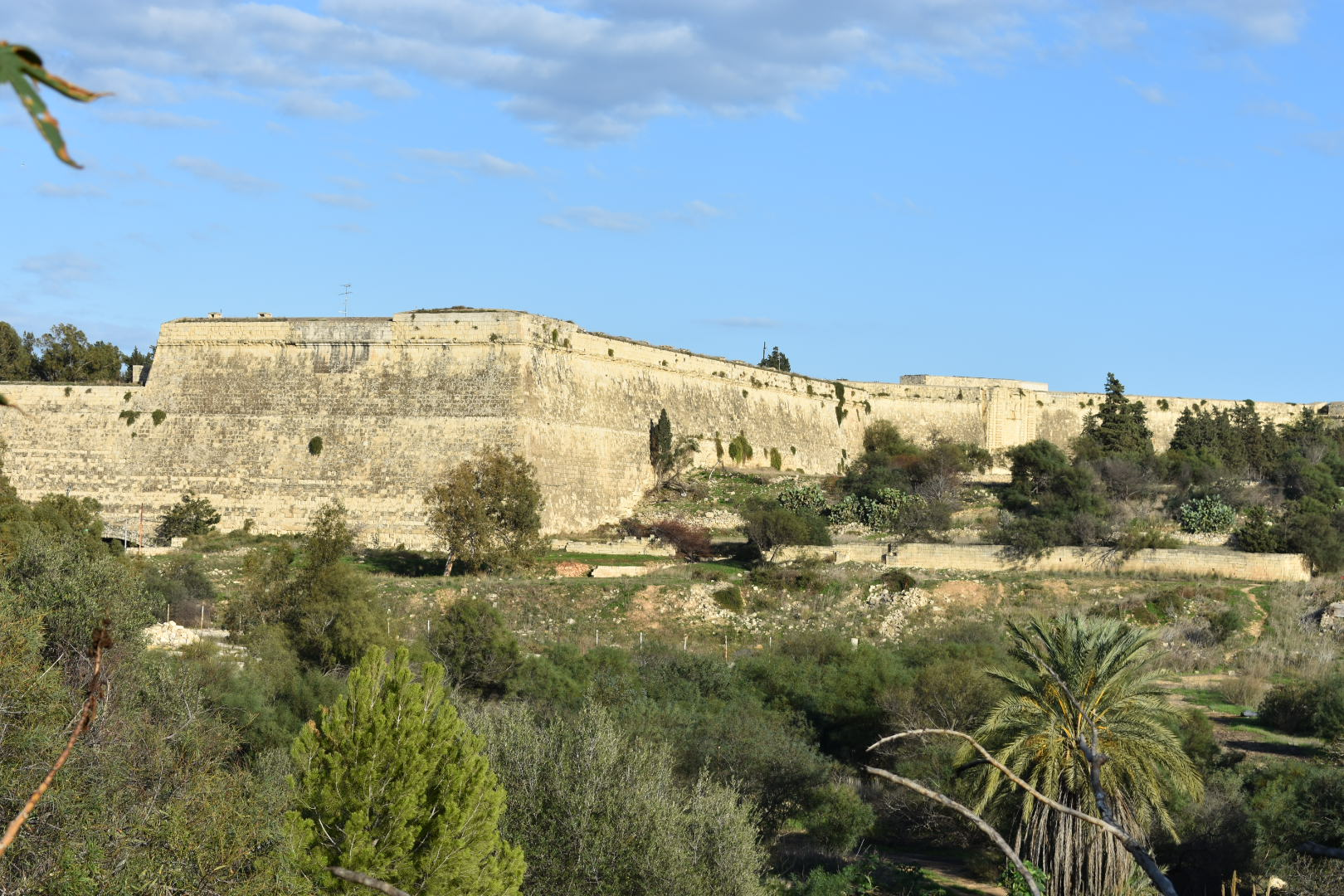
- The Cottonera Lines as seen from Għajn Dwieli

Site information
- Type: Line of fortifications
- Owner: Government of Malta; Various private owners
- Condition: Mostly intact

Location
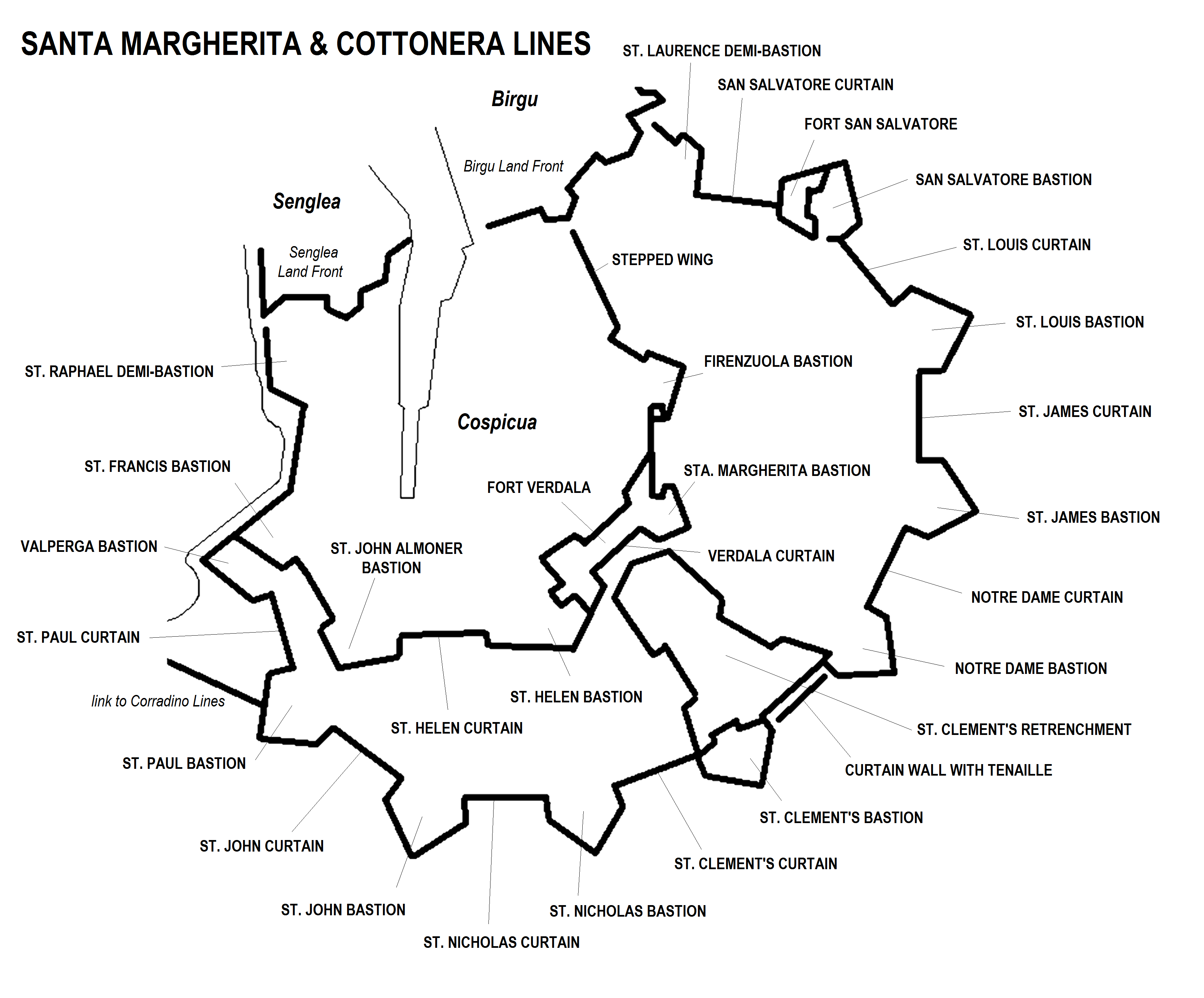
- Map of the Cottonera Lines and the Santa Margherita Lines. The Cottonera Lines are the outer line of fortifications.
- Coordinates: 35°52′37.4″N 14°31′36.2″E

Site history
- Built: 1670–1760s
- Built by: Order of Saint John
- In use: 17th–20th centuries
- Materials: Limestone
- Battles/wars: Siege of Malta (1798–1800)

The Cottonera Lines (Maltese: Is-Swar tal-Kottonera), also known as the Valperga Lines (Maltese: Is-Swar ta' Valperga), are a line of fortifications in Bormla and Birgu, Malta. They were built in the 17th and 18th centuries on higher ground and further outwards than the earlier line of fortifications, known as the Santa Margherita or Firenzuola lines, which also surround Bormla.

== History ==
In 1638, the construction of Santa Margherita fortifications began around Bormla but work stopped soon after due to a lack of funds, and they remained in an unfinished state.

In 1669, fears of an Ottoman attack rose after the fall of Candia, and a new city, the Civitas Cotonera, named after the reigning Grand Master, Nicolas Cotoner was designed by the Italian engineer Antonio Maurizio Valperga, who also modified the Floriana Lines and some other fortifications of the Grand Harbour. In times of siege, the Civitas Cotonera was meant to offer shelter to the 40,000 island's inhabitants and their animals.

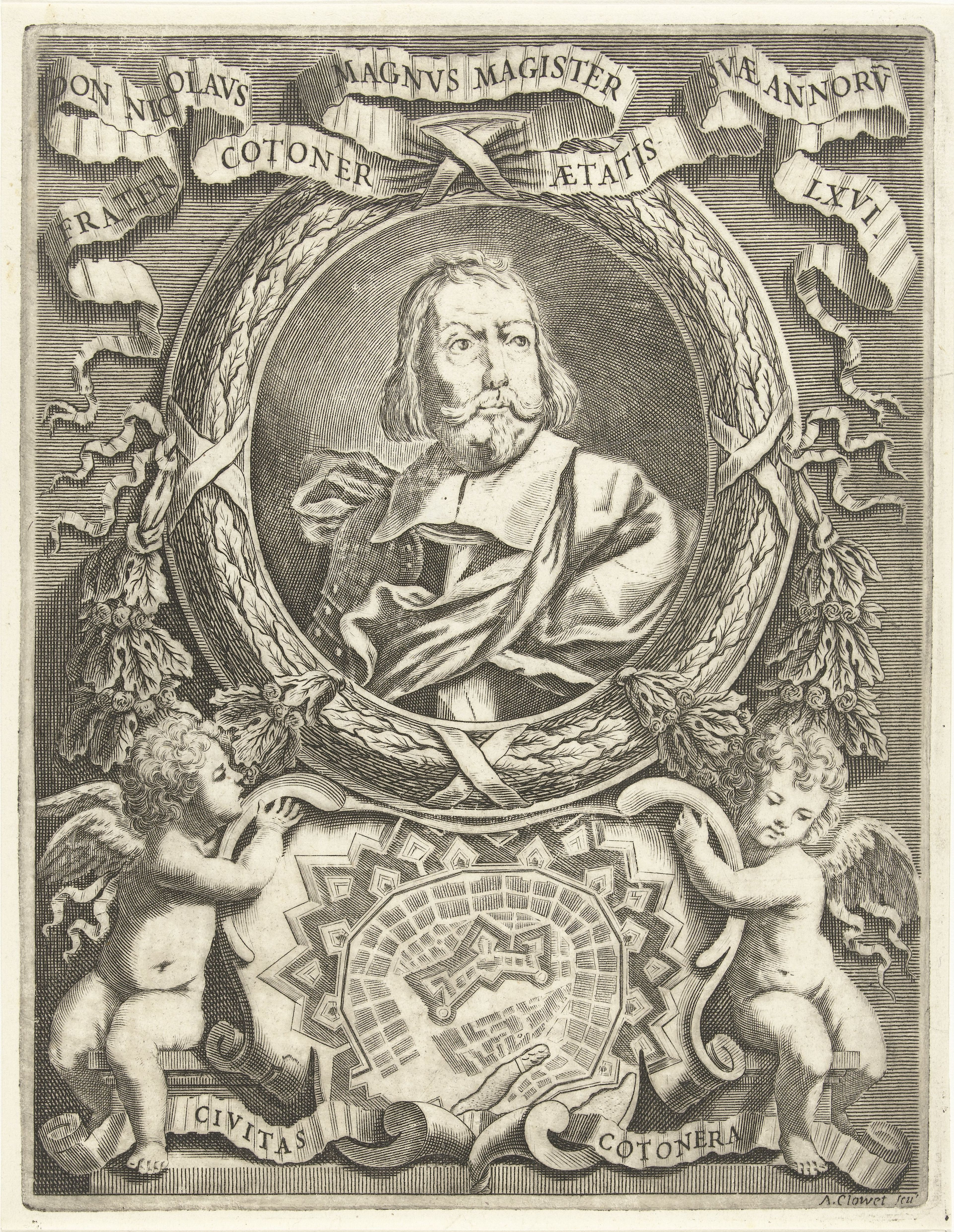
Portrait of Grand Master Nicolas Cotoner with a plan of the Cottonera Lines

The Civitas Cotonera was called the "most ambitious work of fortification ever undertaken by the Knights of St. John in Malta".

Construction of the Civita Cotonera and conversion of the earlier fortifications into the Santa Margherita castle, commenced in 1670 but following an outbreak of the plague, which only helped to put more pressure on the Order's already depleted funds, work was discontinued. In 1680 Grand Master Nicolas Cotoner died and his project was shelved.

By this time, the bastioned enceinte was mostly complete and parts of the ditch had been excavated, but other crucial parts such as cavaliers, ravelins, the glacis and the covertway had not yet been built.

In the early 18th century, some efforts were made to complete the Cotonera fortifications. Contrary to Grandmaster Cotoner's plan for a castle at the centre of the new city, the Santa Margherita was continued as a line of fortifications.

Gunpowder magazines were built on St. James and St. Clement Bastions, while Fort San Salvatore was built on St. Salvatore Bastion. The lines were eventually completed in the 1760s, but the ditch was left unfinished while the outworks and cavaliers were never built.

During the French blockade of 1798–1800, the Cottonera lines were held by the French. The Maltese insurgents who had rebelled against them built an entrenchment around the Cottonera and the other fortifications in the harbour area. A number of batteries and lookout posts, such as Tal-Borg Battery and Windmill Redoubt, were also built in the vicinity. Meanwhile, the French bombarded the Maltese in Żabbar.

The British modified the incomplete Civitas Cotonera in the 19th century with the construction of St. Clement's Retrenchment, which connected the Cotonera with the Santa Margherita fortifications. As part of this project the British also built the Fort Verdala on the same site that Grandmaster Nicolas Cotoner had intended to build his castle. In the 1870s, the Valperga Bastion and St. Paul's Curtain, the St. Paul's Gate and a church dedicated to St. Francis De Paule were demolished to make way for the new road and Ghajn Dwieli tunnel, which formed part of an extension of the Malta Dockyard.

The fortifications were included in the Antiquities List of 1925.

Originally Cottonera was a town between Cottonera lines and St Margaret fortifications. When the knights came to Malta and started planning projects, the Cottonera and the three cities were a land named Birmula. It was big enough to divide this land into three cities and a town named Civitas Cotonera. Originally it's not part of Cospicua or Birgu.

== Layout ==
The Cottonera Lines consist of the following bastions and curtain walls (going clockwise from Kalkara Creek to French Creek):

- St. Laurence Demi-Bastion – a two-tiered demi-bastion linking the Cottonera Lines to the Birgu Land Front. Its lower part was damaged in World War II, and its upper part now houses a school.
- San Salvatore Curtain – curtain wall between St. Laurence Demi-Bastion and San Salvatore Bastion. It contains San Salvatore Gate and two modern breaches.

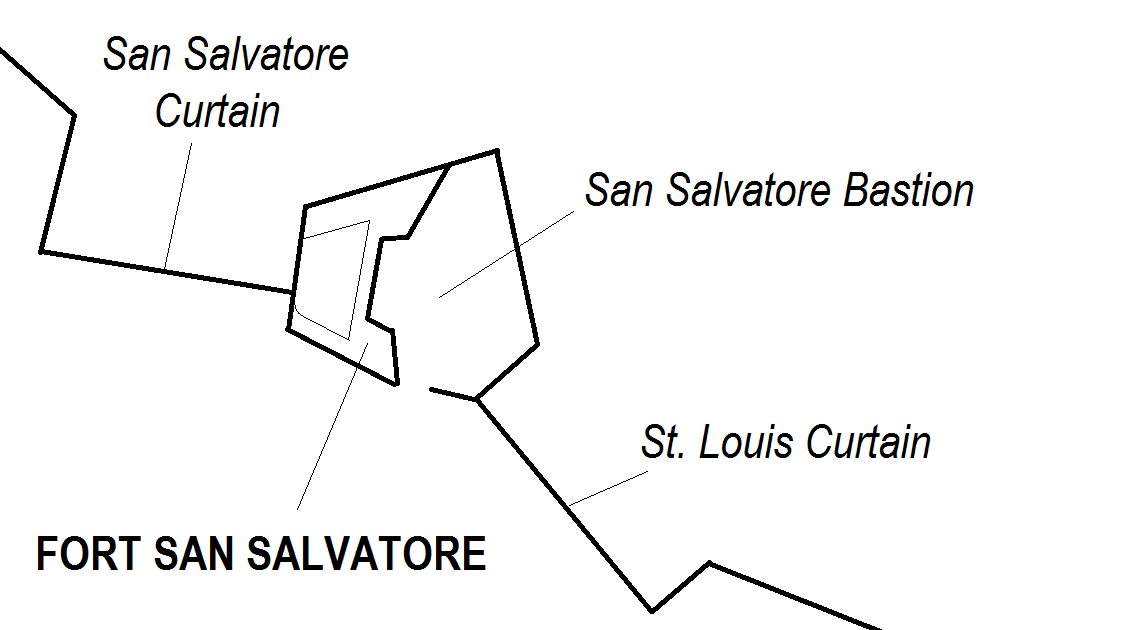
Map of San Salvatore Bastion (including Fort San Salvatore) and the adjoining curtain walls

- San Salvatore Bastion – a pentagonal bastion retrenched with Fort San Salvatore, which was built in 1724.
- St. Louis Curtain – curtain wall between San Salvatore and St. Louis Bastions. It contains the blocked-up St. Louis Gate.
- St. Louis Bastion – a pentagonal bastion containing a World War II-era machine gun post, a 19th-century cemetery and a private orchard.
- St. James Curtain – curtain wall between St. Louis and St. James Bastions. It contains the blocked-up St. James Gate.
- St. James Bastion – a pentagonal bastion, containing a gunpowder magazine which was later converted into a chapel. It now forms part of the grounds of St. Edward's College.

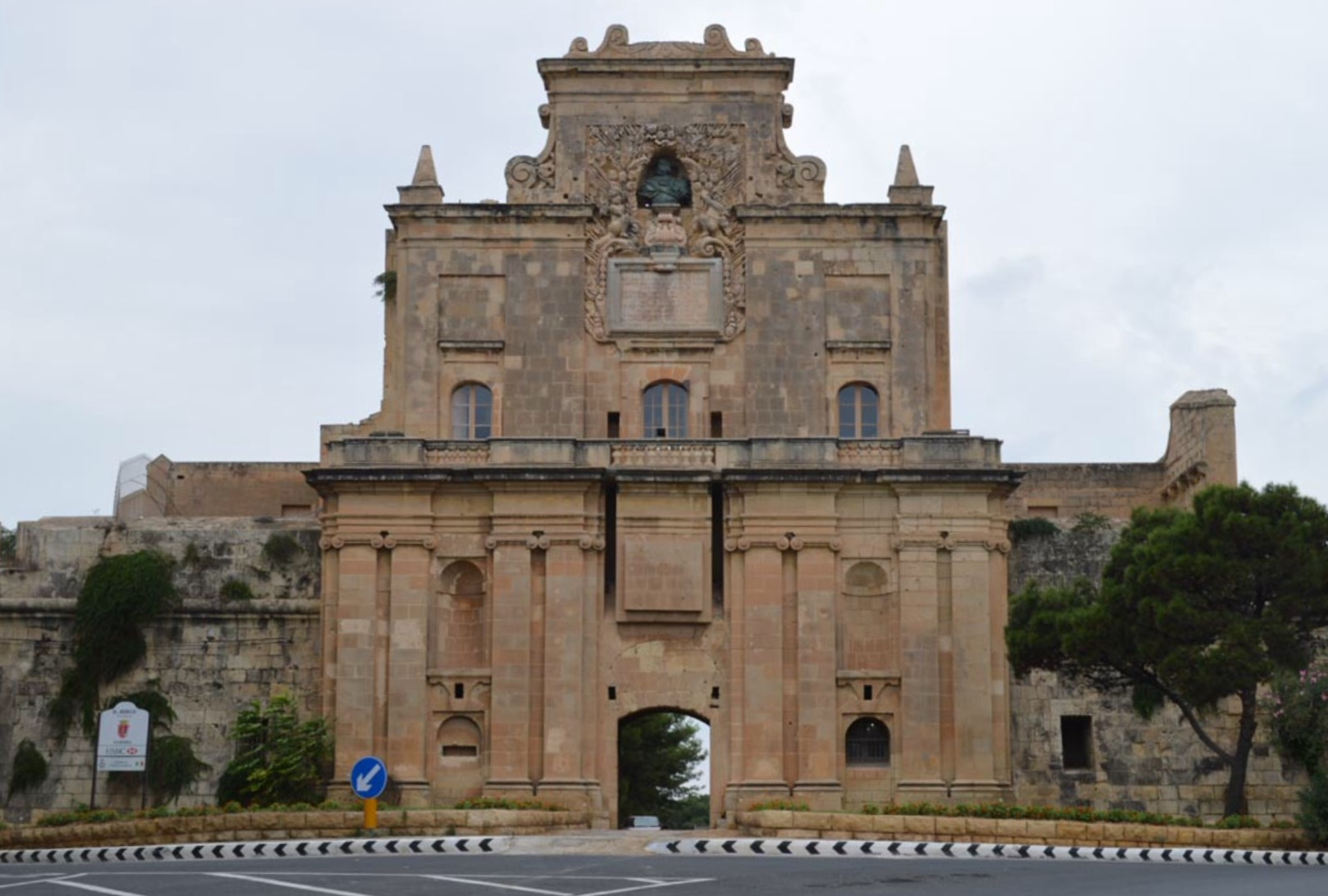
The Notre Dame Gate, the main gate of the Cottonera Lines

- Notre Dame Curtain – curtain wall between St. James and Notre Dame Bastions. It contains Notre Dame Gate (the lines' main gate) and two modern breaches. It was originally protected by a ditch and tenaille, but these no longer exist.
- Notre Dame Bastion – a pentagonal bastion, containing a 19th-century redoubt.
- an unnamed curtain wall between Notre Dame and St. Clement's Bastions. It was heavily altered in the 19th century when it was incorporated into St. Clement's Retrenchment, which links the Cottonera Lines to the Santa Margherita Lines. It is protected by a tenaille.
- St. Clement's Bastion – a pentagonal bastion which was heavily altered in the 19th century when it was incorporated into St. Clement's Retrenchment. It contains a demi-bastioned retrenchment, a gunpowder magazine and a World War II-era anti-aircraft battery with a control station and four concrete emplacements.
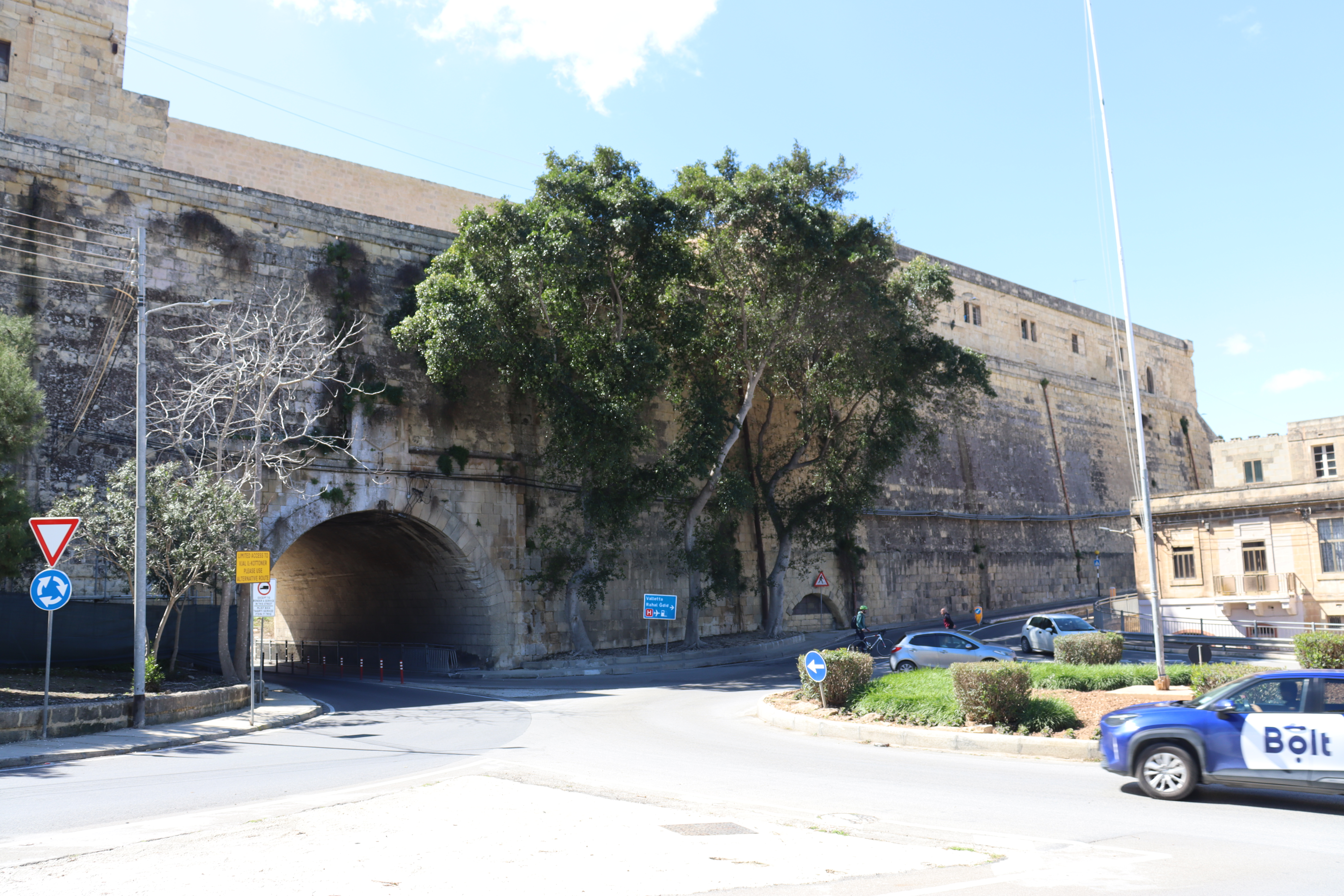
- The lines as seen from the limits of Bormla, pictured in 2026
  St. Clement's Curtain – curtain wall between St. Clement's and St. Nicholas Bastions. It contains the walled-up St. Clement Gate.
- St. Nicholas Bastion – a pentagonal bastion containing a casemated battery and a barrack block.
- St. Nicholas Curtain, also known as Polverista Curtain – curtain wall between St. Nicholas and St. John Bastions. It contains a modern arched opening.
- St. John Bastion – a pentagonal bastion containing a casemated battery and a World War II-era machine gun post. Housing estates were built in its piazza in the 1960s.
- St. John Curtain – curtain wall between St. John and St. Paul Bastions. It contains the walled-up St. John Gate.
- St. Paul Bastion – a pentagonal bastion containing casemates which were eventually converted into barracks. In the 19th century, it was linked to the Corradino Lines. A tunnel allowing vehicular access to the Three Cities now cuts into bastion's base.
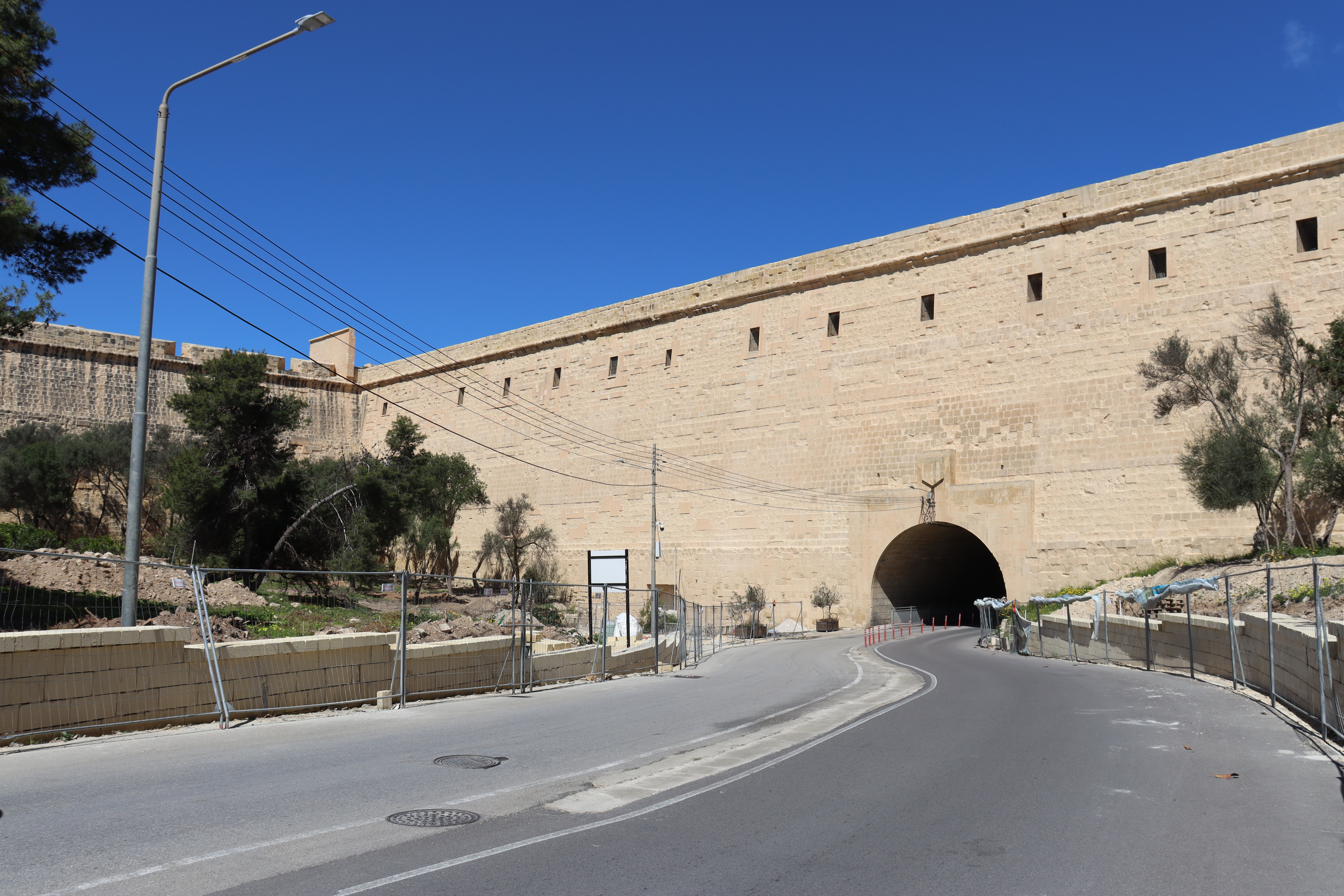
- The lines as seen from the limits of Fgura, pictured in 2026
  St. Paul Curtain – curtain wall between St. Paul and Valperga Bastions. It contained St. Paul Gate, also known as Porta Haynduieli. The curtain and gate were demolished in the 1870s to make way for the extension of the dockyard.
- Valperga Bastion – a large demi-bastion which was demolished in the 1870s to make way for the extension of the dockyard.

Today, St. Laurence Demi-Bastion to Notre Dame Curtain fall within the limits of Birgu, while Notre Dame to St. Paul Bastions fall within the limits of Cospicua.
