= Fort San Salvatore =

Retrenched fort in Birgu, Malta

- Il-Forti San Salvatur
- Part of the Cottonera Lines
- Birgu, Malta
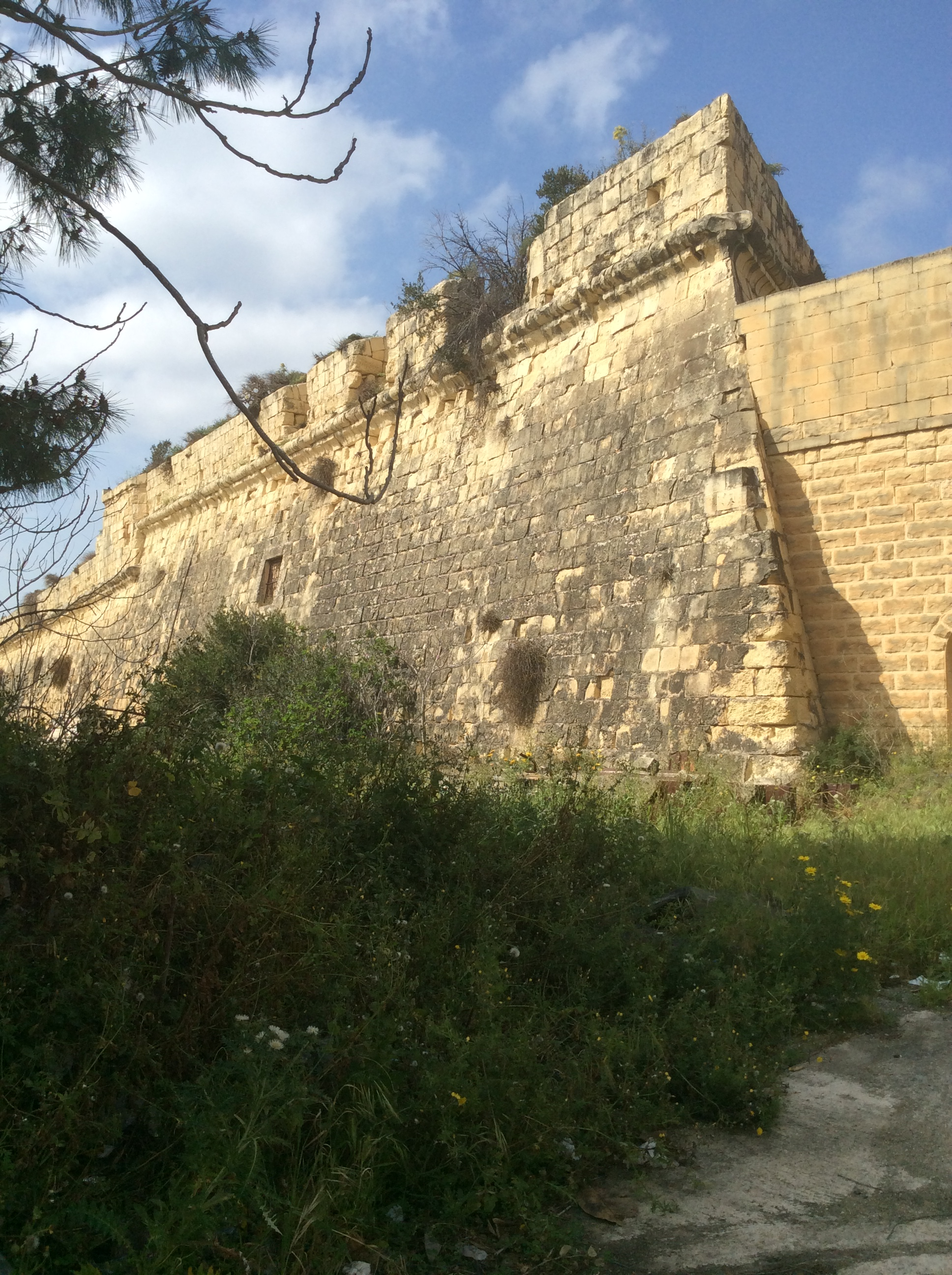
- Walls of Fort San Salvatore

Site information
- Type: Retrenched bastioned fort
- Owner: Private
- Open to the public: No
- Condition: Intact but dilapidated

Location
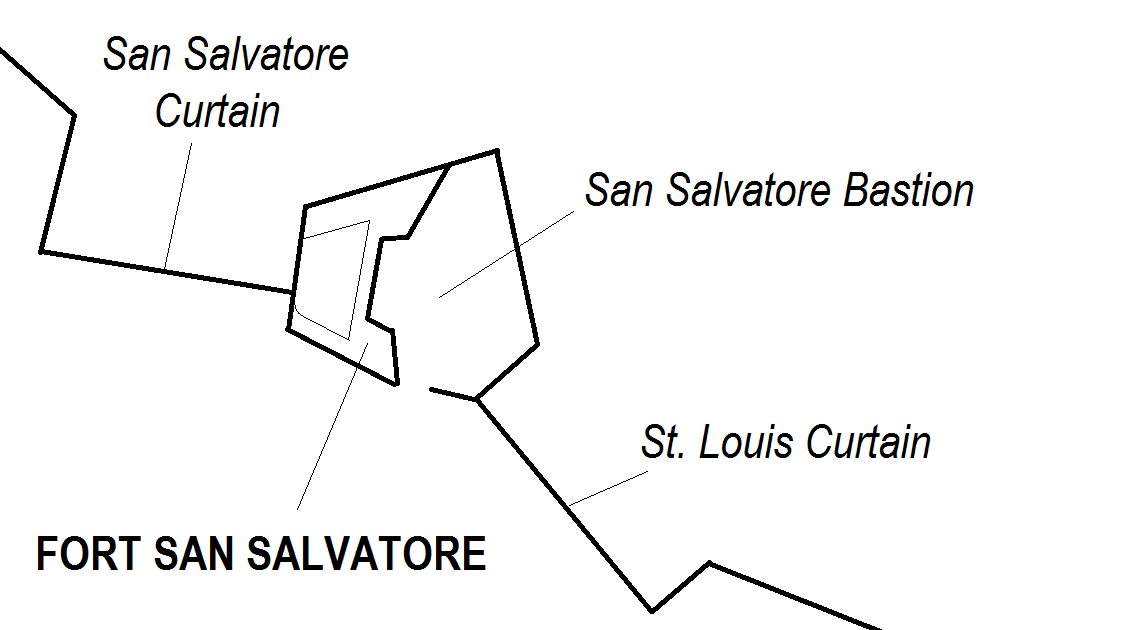
- Map of Fort San Salvatore within San Salvatore Bastion
- Coordinates: 35°53′10″N 14°31′39.9″E
- Area: c. 8,500 m^{2} (91,000 sq ft)

Site history
- Built: 1724
- Built by: Order of Saint John
- Materials: Limestone

Fort San Salvatore (Maltese: Il-Forti San Salvatur), also known as Fort Salvatore (Maltese: Il-Fortizza tas-Salvatur), is a retrenched fort in Birgu, Malta. It was built in 1724 on one of the bastions of the Cottonera Lines. It was used as a prisoner-of-war camp during the Greek War of Independence and World War I, and as an internment camp and kerosene depot in World War II.

== History ==
Construction of the Cottonera Lines began in 1670, but work was suspended ten years later due to a lack of funds. By this time, the bastioned enceinte was complete, but other crucial parts such as cavaliers, ravelins, the ditch, the glacis and the covertway had not yet been built. In the early 18th century, some efforts were made to complete the lines, although they still lacked some crucial elements.

In 1724, San Salvatore Bastion, the northernmost bastion of the Cottonera Lines and the closest to the city of Birgu, was converted into a retrenched fort by French military engineers. The fort has two demi-bastions linked by a curtain wall, all of which are surrounded by a ditch. A parade ground is located in the centre of the fort.

The fort remained in use by the British in the 19th and 20th centuries. From 1824, it was used as a prisoner-of-war camp for Turkish prisoners during the Greek War of Independence. It became a POW camp once more when it housed German prisoners in World War I.

Between May and July 1940, some Maltese who were believed to be supporters of Italian irridentism, including future Prime Minister Enrico Mizzi, were interred within the fort. 43 of the internees were later exiled to Uganda, but were allowed to return in 1945.

During World War II, the fort became a kerosene depot. The depot exploded when the fort was bombed by Italian aircraft on 25 October 1941.

== Present day ==
Like most of the Cottonera Lines, today the fort still exists but is in a rather dilapidated state.

Fort San Salvatore is one of the few fortifications in Malta which are private property. In 1958, Prime Minister Dom Mintoff leased the fort to Prestressed Concrete Limited, a company owned by his brother Raymond Mintoff, for £100 every six months. In 1982, the fort's emphyteusis was redeemed for £M 2,000, and the fort became private property.

In April 2015, the fort's owners asked €3.2 million to sell it to private investors. In May of the same year, several NGOs suggested that the campus of the proposed American University of Malta should be split up between Fort San Salvatore and the nearby Fort Ricasoli and Fort Saint Rocco. This proposal will not be implemented, as the campus is to be split up between Dock No. 1 in Cospicua and Żonqor Point in Marsaskala.
