= Notre Dame Gate =

- Bieb is-Sultan
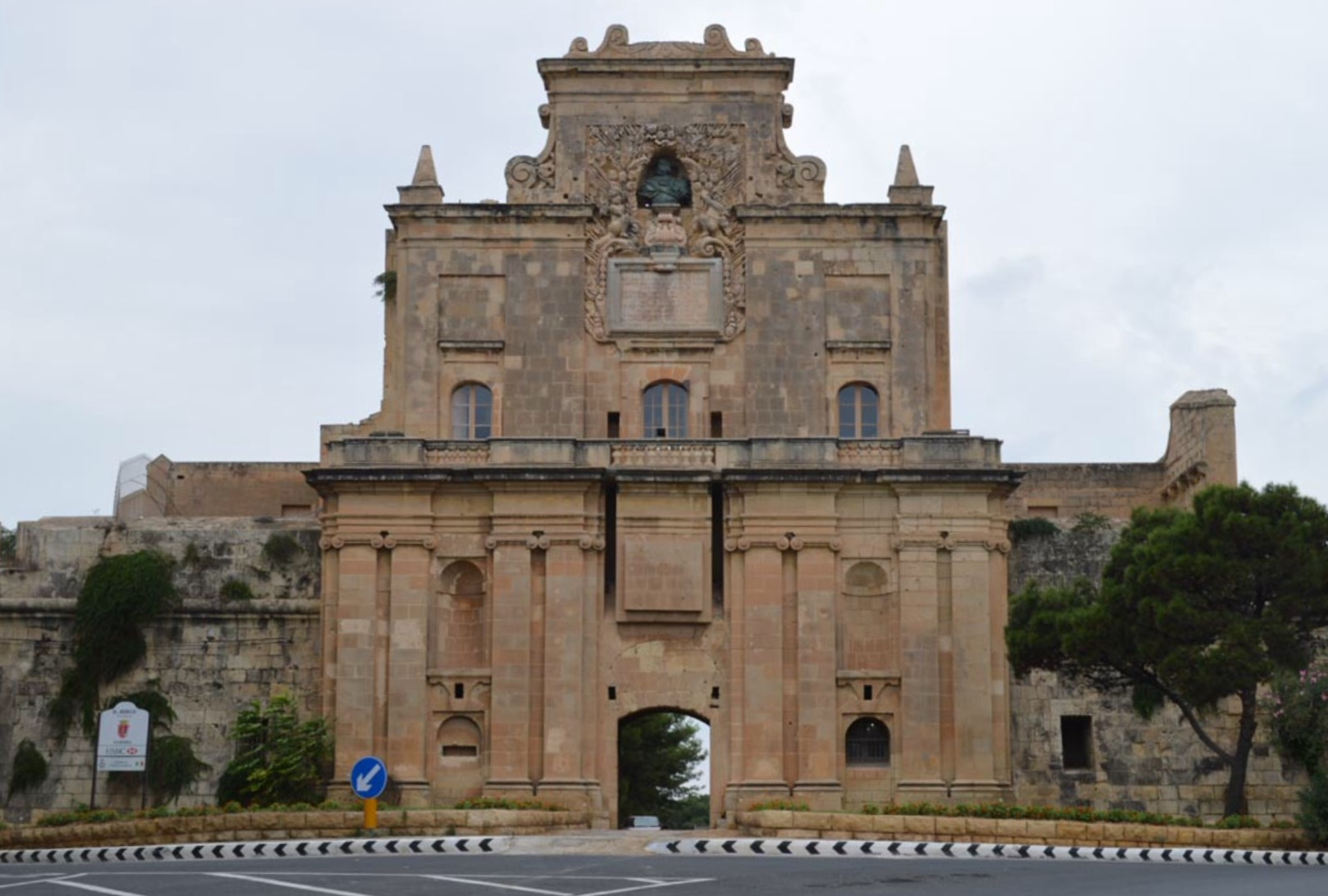
- View of the Notre Dame Gate
- Alternative names: Cottonera Gate; Żabbar Gate

General information
- Status: Intact
- Type: City gate
- Architectural style: Baroque
- Location: Cottonera, Malta
- Coordinates: 35°52′49.3″N 14°31′45.6″E
- Current tenants: Fondazzjoni Wirt Artna
- Named for: Our Lady of Graces
- Completed: 1675
- Owner: Government of Malta

Technical details
- Material: Limestone

Design and construction
- Architect(s): Romano Carapecchia, built as part of the Cottonera Lines attributed to military engineer Mederico Blondel des Croisettes

Website
- notredamegatemalta.weebly.com

The Notre Dame Gate, also known as the Notre Dame de la Grace Gate (Italian: Porta della Maria Vergine delle Grazie), the Cottonera Gate, the Żabbar Gate (Maltese: Il-Mina ta' Ħaż-Żabbar) or Bieb is-Sultan (Maltese for "King's Gate"), is the main gate of the Cottonera Lines, located in Cottonera, Malta. The gate was built in 1675 in the Baroque style, and it is currently used as the headquarters of the heritage organization Fondazzjoni Wirt Artna.

== History ==
Construction of the Cottonera Lines began in August 1670, when there were fears of an Ottoman attack after the fall of Candia. The Notre Dame Gate was built in 1675 as the lines' main gate, and its design is attributed to Romano Carapecchia or Mederico Blondel. The gate is located within the Notre Dame Curtain, between Notre Dame and St. James Bastions, facing the town of Żabbar. It is situated at the highest point of the Cottonera area, and its roof was used to relay signals between Valletta and the coastal defences on the eastern part of Malta. The gate was originally protected by a drop ditch and a tenaille.

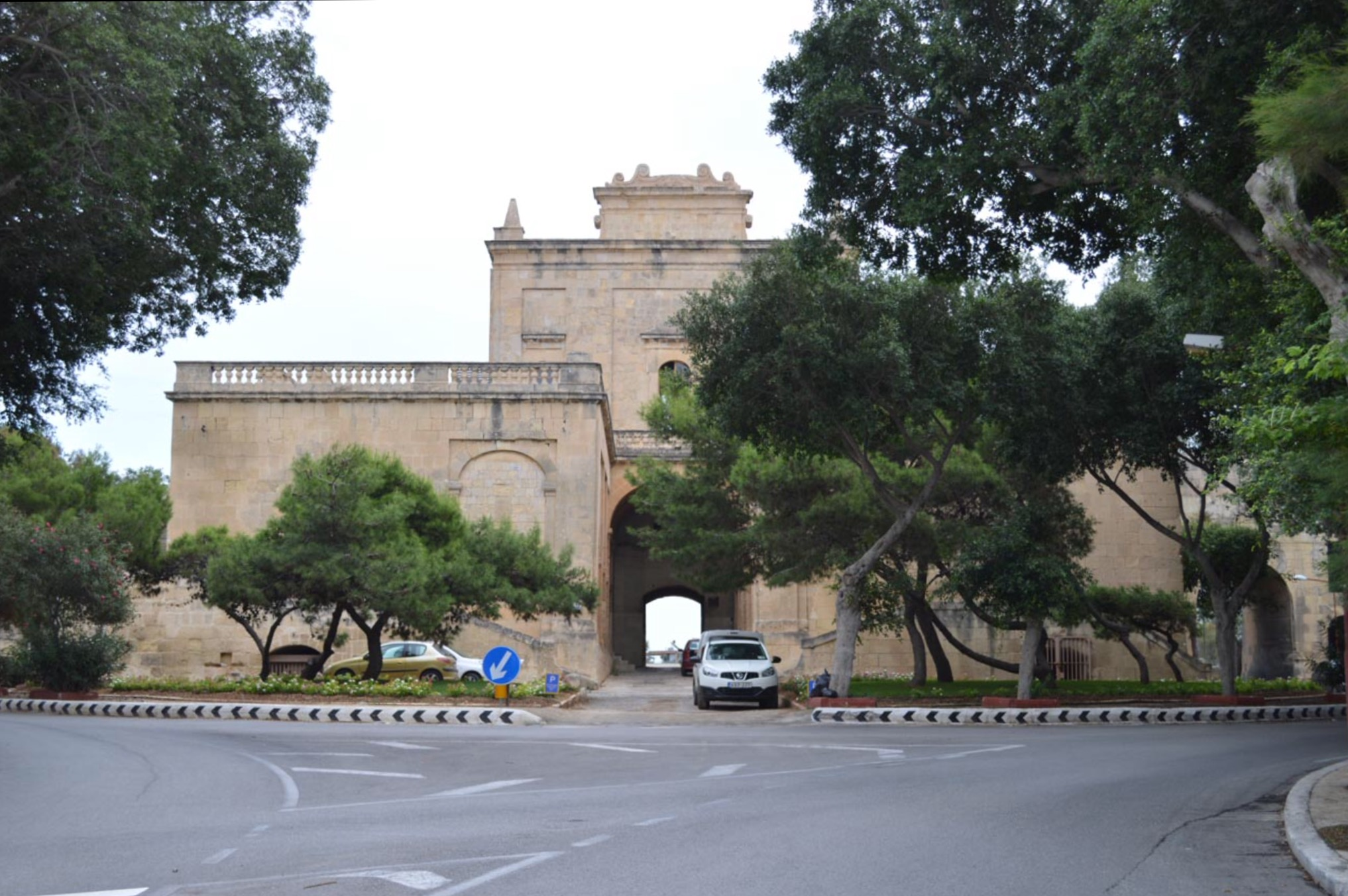
Back view of the gate

The gate remained in use throughout the years of Hospitaller, French and British rule. The gate gradually served as an adjunct to the Cottonera Military Hospital (now St. Edward's College) following its construction in 1870. Many wounded soldiers were accommodated within the gate during World War I.

The gate's ditch was filled in and the drawbridge removed sometime after the 1930s, while the tenaille was demolished. The gate was damaged by aerial bombardment during World War II, when one of the adjacent barrack blocks received a direct hit.

In the early 21st century, the Notre Dame Gate was passed to the Malta Heritage Trust, Fondazzjoni Wirt Artna, who moved their main offices into the upper part of the gate in late 2005. The foundation has since carried out a number of restoration works to parts of the gate, which is now open to the public once every week.

The gate was included on the Antiquities List of 1925, together with the rest of the Cottonera Lines. It is now scheduled as a Grade 1 national monument, and it is also listed on the National Inventory of the Cultural Property of the Maltese Islands.

== Architecture ==
The Notre Dame Gate is built in the Baroque style, and it has five levels, and it includes underground chambers, two barrack blocks, and a superstructure consisting of a gatehouse built on two levels, a veranda and a signalling top. The monumental façade is decorated with Corinthian pilasters, and it has a panel with a trophy of arms surrounding a bronze bust of Grand Master Nicolas Cotoner and a marble plaque with a Latin inscription.

The bust was cast by Pietro Sances of Messina in the 1670s, and it is regarded as one of the most important works of art in bronze in Malta. During the French occupation of Malta, the bust was taken by the French as spoils of war, but it was returned to Malta by the British. There were some failed attempts to steal the bust in the 1960s, and it was restored between 2004 and 2008.
