= Retrenchment (military) =

Type of military fortification

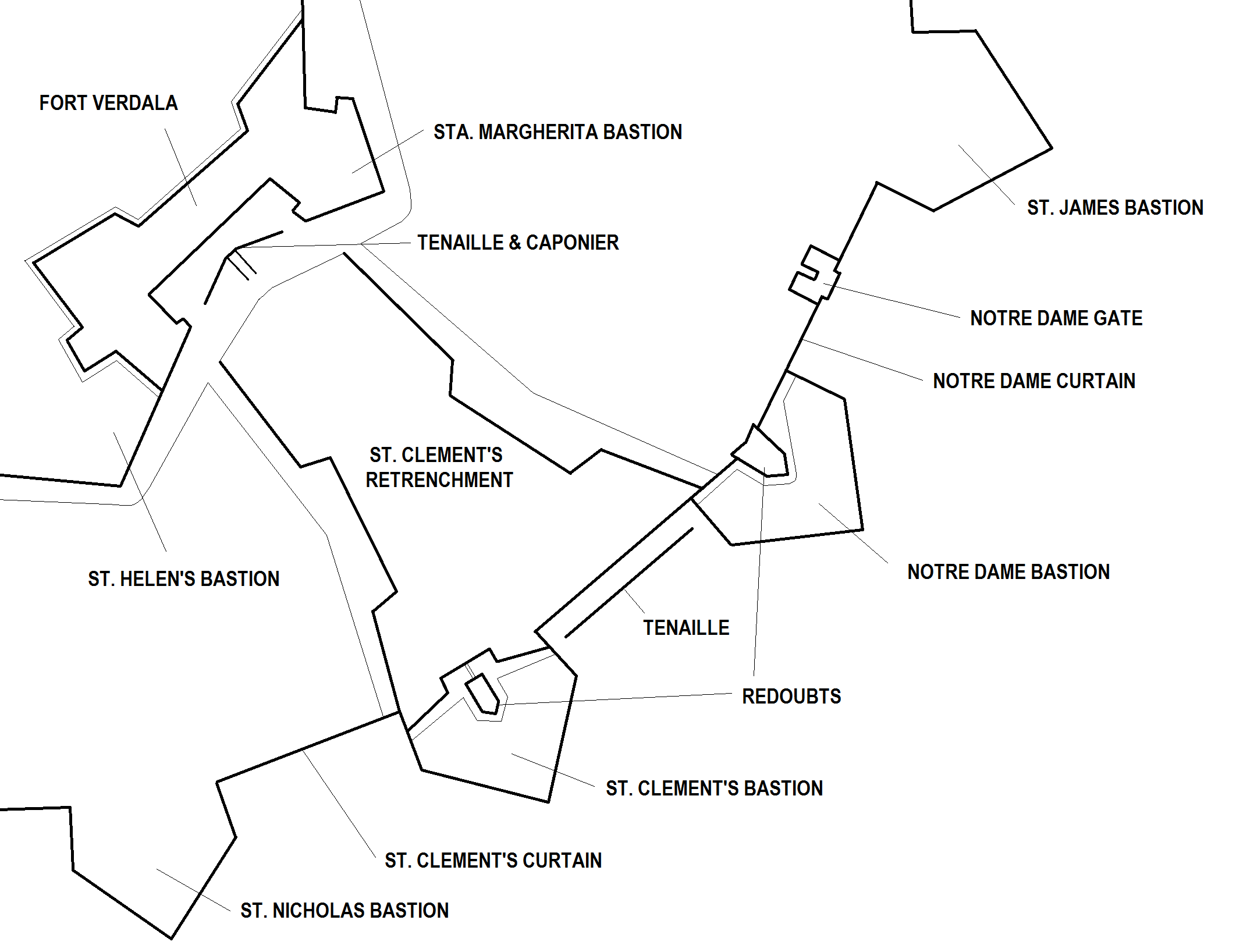
Map of St. Clement's Retrenchment between the Santa Margherita Lines and the Cottonera Lines in Cospicua, Malta

Retrenchment is a technical term in fortification, where it is applied to a secondary work or series of works constructed in rear of existing defences to bar the further progress of the enemy who succeeds in breaching or storming these. An example was in the siege of Port Arthur in 1904.

A retrenchment can also be referred to as an entrenchment.
