= International Angiology =

- Discipline: angiology
- Language: English
- Edited by: A. Nicolaides

Publication details
- History: 1982–present
- Publisher: Edizioni Minerva Medica (Italy)
- Frequency: bimonthly
- Impact factor: 1.462 (2012)

Standard abbreviations
- ISO 4: Int. Angiol.

Indexing
- CODEN: INANEK
- ISSN: 0392-9590 (print); 1827-1839 (web)
- OCLC no.: 10637543

Links
- Journal homepage; archives

International Angiology is the official medical journal of the International Union of Angiology, the International Union of Phlebology and the Central European Vascular Forum, published for them by Edizioni Minerva Medica of Turin.
