= Society for Vascular Medicine =

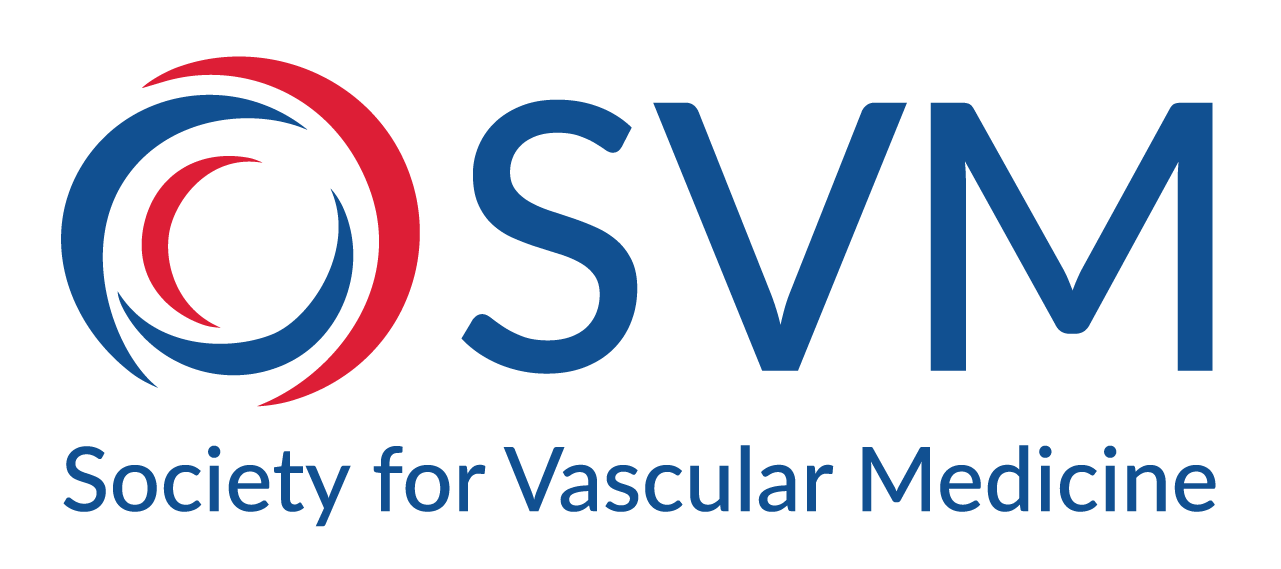

The Society for Vascular Medicine is a learned society base in the United States. It is considered a medical specialty professional society in the field of vascular medicine.

Vascular medicine relates to the care and treatment of medical issues related to vessels such as arteries, veins and organs and structures involved in the anatomical transport of blood and lymph throughout the human body. It is sometimes considered sub-specialty of Internal Medicine. The society publishes the journal, 'Vascular Medicine Journal'. A peer reviewed academic publication.

== Work ==
The Society of Vascular Medicine promotes and advances the field of the Vascular Medicine to improve the care of patients. Its membership is multidisciplinary, drawing from specialists in internal medicine, cardiology, vascular surgery, interventional radiology, hematology, among others.

== Conferences ==
The Society for Vascular Medicine hosts two major conferences annually:

- The Vascular Scientific Sessions. This is an annual international medical conference held in the United States. It focuses on clinical vascular medicine as well as vascular-related medical research (including basic science, translational science, outcomes science and clinical trials).
- The Society for Vascular Medicine Fellows and Advanced practice nurse Course.

== Structure ==
The Society for Vascular Medicine is a volunteer, 501(c)(3) organization. It has an Executive Committee and a Board of Trustees. There are several committees. Each committee has a chair and a co-chair who serve for a period of 1-3 years. The society is managed by a management company, Veritas AMC.
