= Annals of Transplantation =

- Discipline: Organ transplantation
- Language: English
- Edited by: Wojciech Lisik, Piotr Małkowski, Krzysztof Zieniewicz

Publication details
- History: 1996–present
- Publisher: International Scientific Information, USA on behalf of the Polish Transplantation Society (Poland)
- Frequency: Quarterly
- Impact factor: 1.032 (2015)

Standard abbreviations
- ISO 4: Ann. Transplant.

Indexing
- ISSN: 1425-9524
- OCLC no.: 220954224

Links
- Journal homepage

Annals of Transplantation is a quarterly peer-reviewed medical journal that was established in 1996 and is published by International Scientific Information. It is the official publication of the Polish Transplantation Society with the co-operation of the Czech Transplantation Society and the Hungarian Transplantation Society, and covers research on all aspects of organ transplantation.

== Abstracting and indexing ==
The journal is abstracted and indexed by PubMed/MEDLINE, Scopus, Embase, Science Citation Index Expanded, and Compendex. According to the Journal Citation Reports, the journal has a 2015 impact factor of 1.032.
