= Corradino Lines =

Line of fortification in Paola, Malta

- Is-Swar ta' Kordin
- Paola, Malta
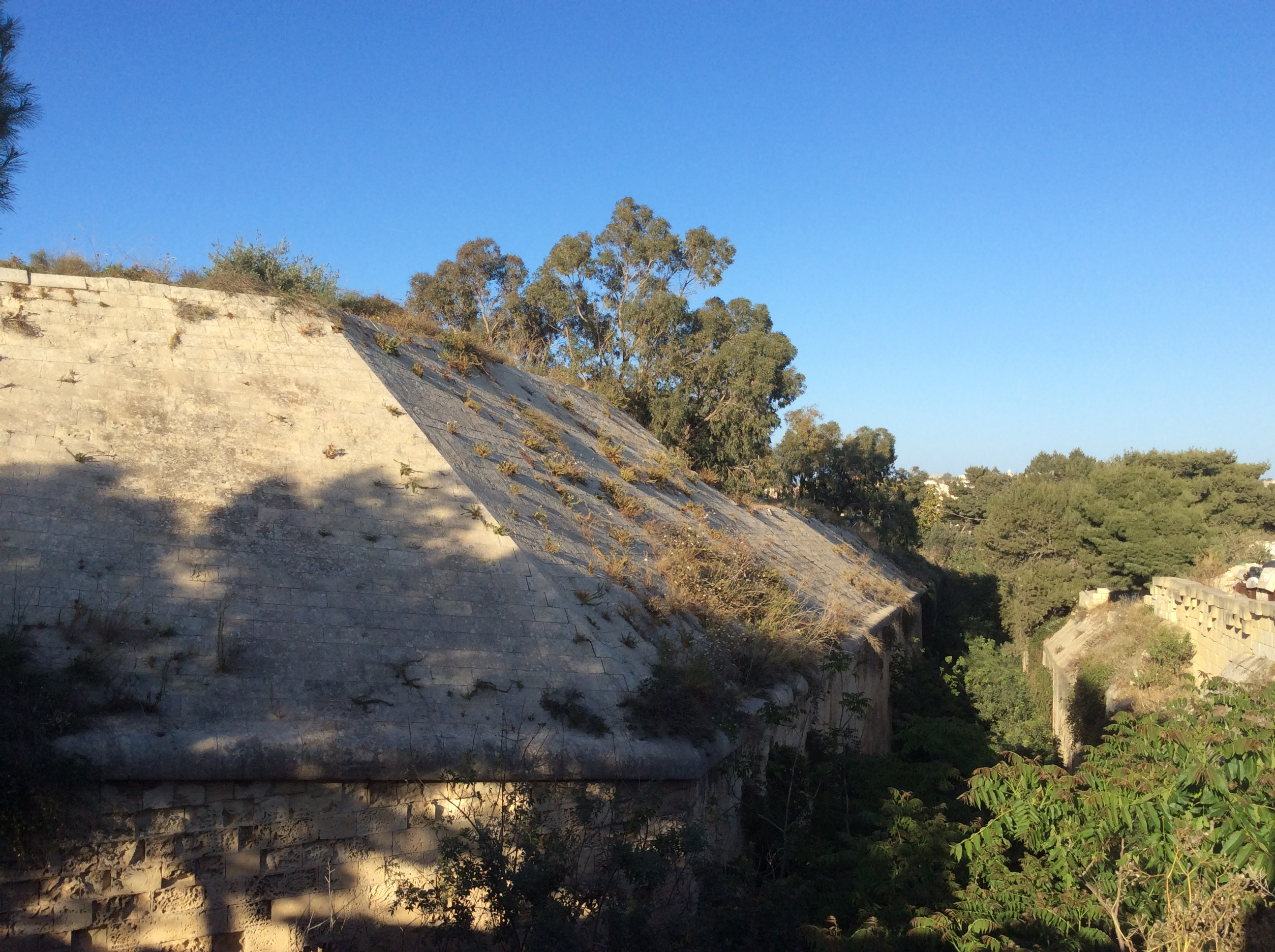
- View of the Corradino Lines and ditch

Site information
- Type: Line of fortification
- Condition: Partly intact

Location
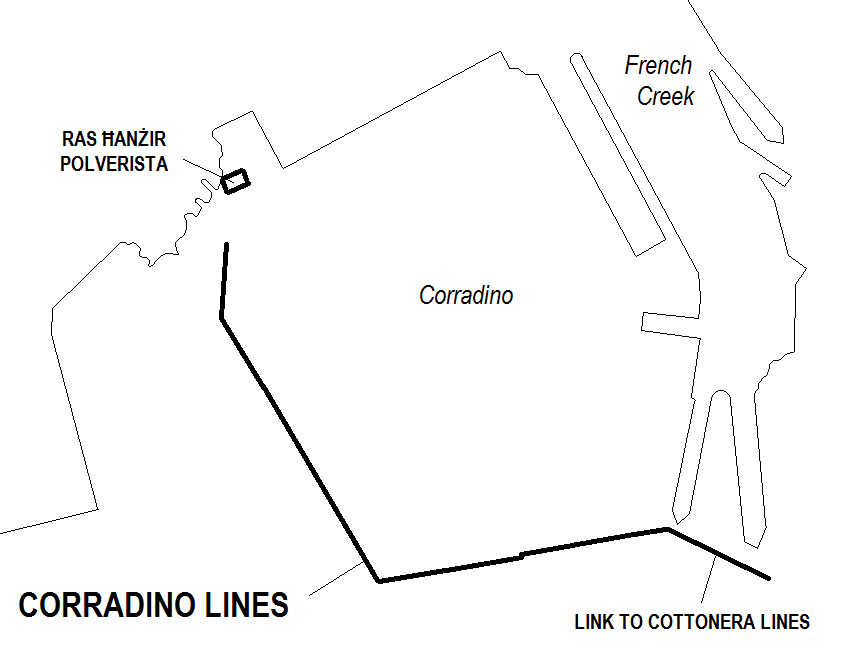
- Map of the Corradino Lines
- Coordinates: 35°52′41″N 14°30′34″E

Site history
- Built: 1871–1880
- Built by: British Empire
- In use: 1880–1900s 1940s
- Materials: Limestone
- Battles/wars: World War II

The Corradino Lines (Maltese: Is-Swar ta' Kordin) are a line of fortification on the Corradino Heights in Paola, Malta. They were built between 1871 and 1880 by the British. Today, the lines are partly intact and they lie in an industrial area.

== History ==
Corradino (Maltese: Kordin) is a large headland within the Grand Harbour, overlooking Senglea and Floriana. Corradino is on high ground compared to the surrounding area, and therefore was of great strategic importance. The site's importance was seen in the Great Siege of Malta in 1565, when Ottomans mounted cannons on high ground to bombard the Order of Saint John in Senglea and Birgu. Over 200 years later, new batteries were built on Corradino, this time by Maltese insurgents to bombard the French during the blockade of 1798–1800.

Although the Order of Saint John built extensive fortifications around most of the Grand Harbour area, Corradino was not fortified. A proposal to build a bastioned enceinte was made in the 1670s following the fall of Candia, but this was never built due to a lack of funds. The only military building on the headland was a polverista at Ras Ħanżir, which Pinto built in 1756.

Malta was eventually taken over by the British, and the island became the Royal Navy's main base in the Mediterranean. In the 1860s, it was decided that the Malta Dockyard be expanded into French Creek, the inlet between Senglea and Corradino. In the following years, the necessity to fortify Corradino was highlighted, since if an enemy took over the headland, the dockyard could be easily attacked.

The Corradino Lines were therefore built by the Royal Engineers between 1871 and 1880, at a total cost of £17634. Part of the megalithic temple of Kordin II was destroyed to make way for the new line of fortification in 1871. The defensive line consisted of a V-shaped polygonal-style trace surrounded by a ditch, stretching all the way from the Cottonera Lines to the Ras Ħanżir polverista. The lines were also meant to protect the polverista, which was modified by the addition of an enclosure pierced by musketry loopholes. The lines were armed with two RML 64-pound guns.

A proposal was made to build a new town within the Corradino Lines, but this was rejected and the area was converted into a naval prison. The lines soon lost their military value, and were abandoned by the end of the 19th or beginning of the 20th centuries.

In World War II, the Corradino Lines were temporarily reestablished as an infantry entrenchment, and a defensive post containing a QF 4 inch Mk V naval gun turret was built.

== Present day ==
In the late 20th century, Corradino was converted into an industrial estate. The Corradino Lines were damaged during the course of development in the area. Despite this, most of the V-shaped enceinte and the ditch are still intact, although they are hidden from view amongst various factory buildings.

Plans are being made to restore the Corradino Lines and turn them into a recreational park.

== Gallery ==
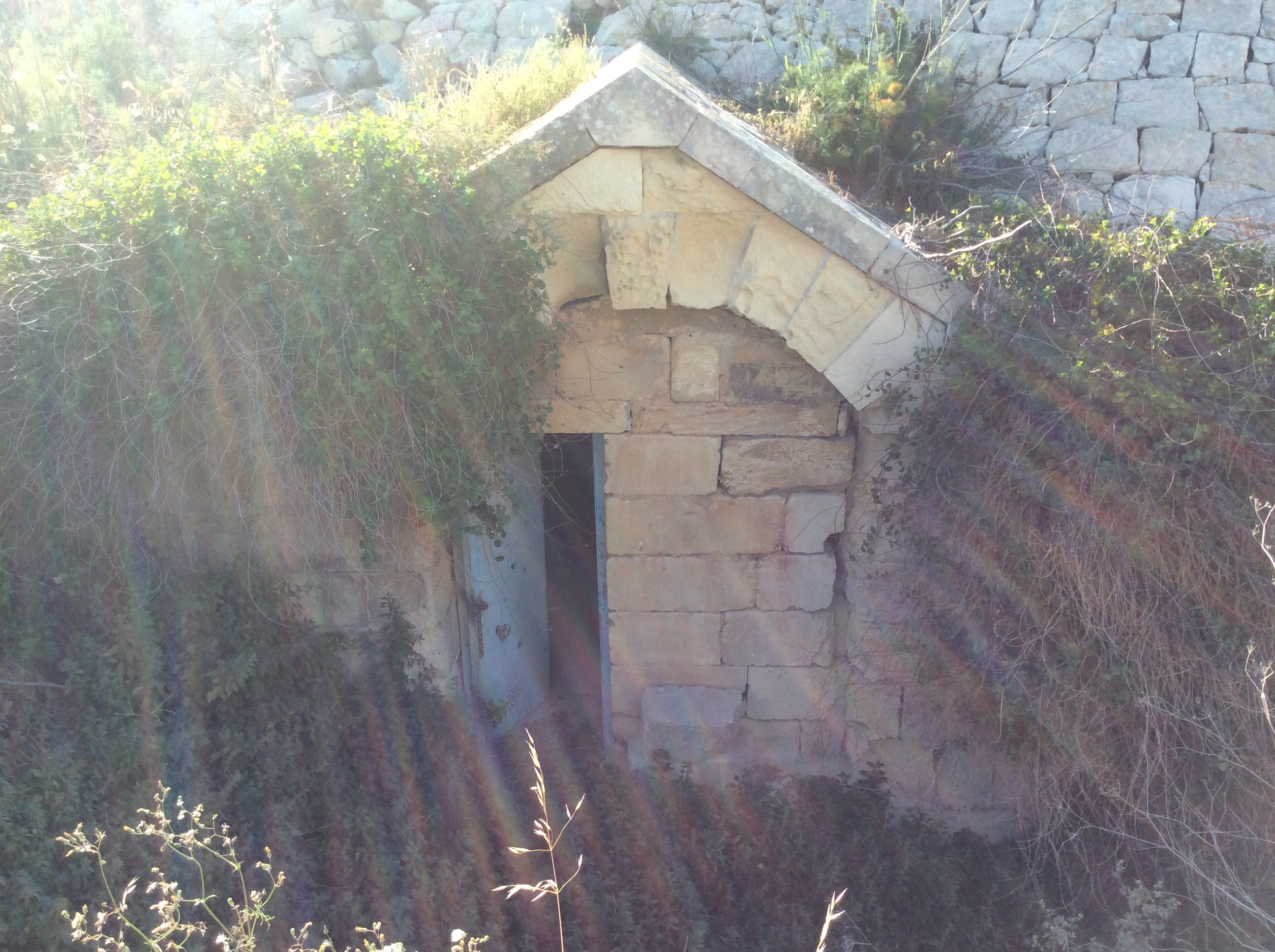

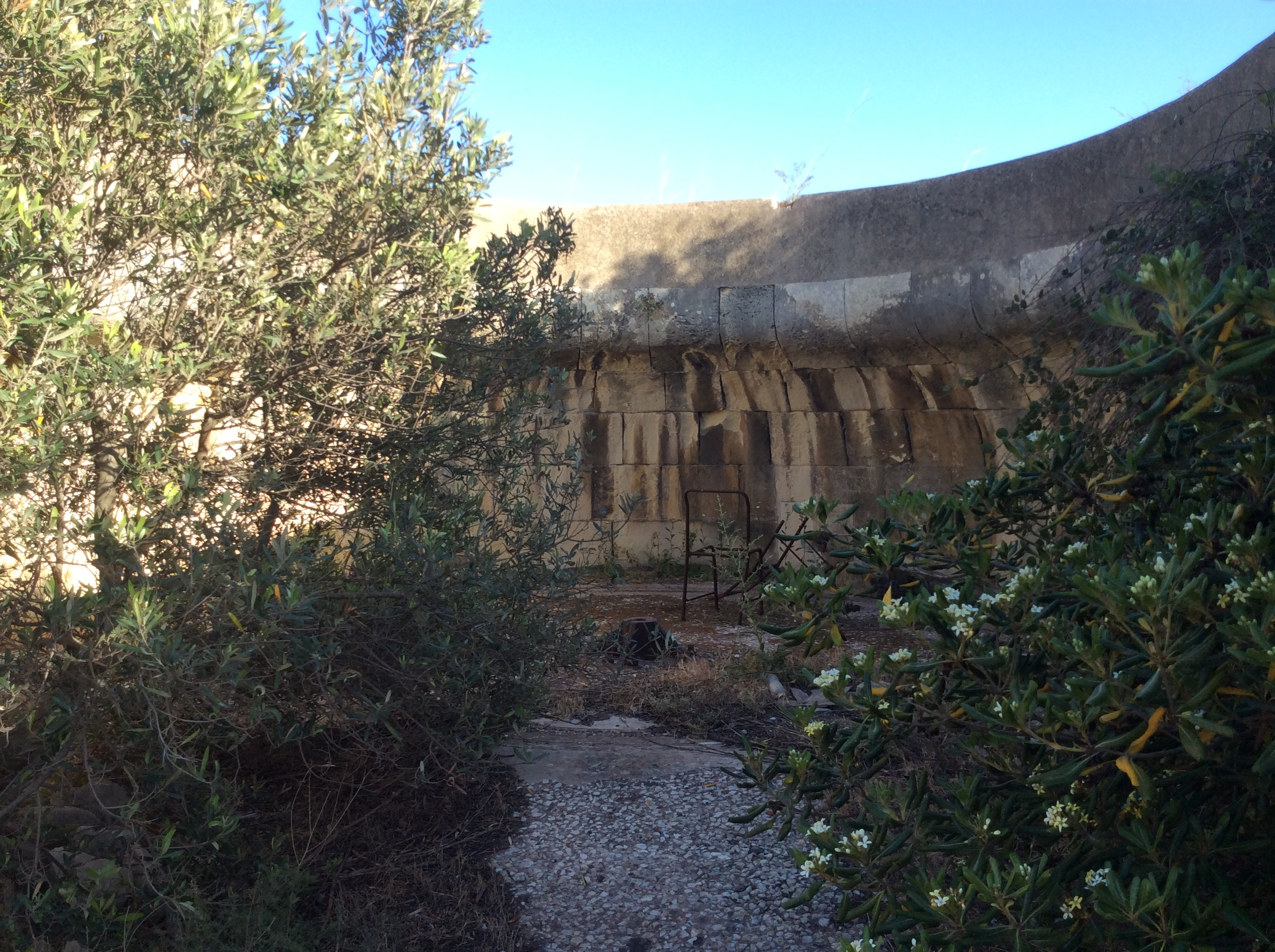

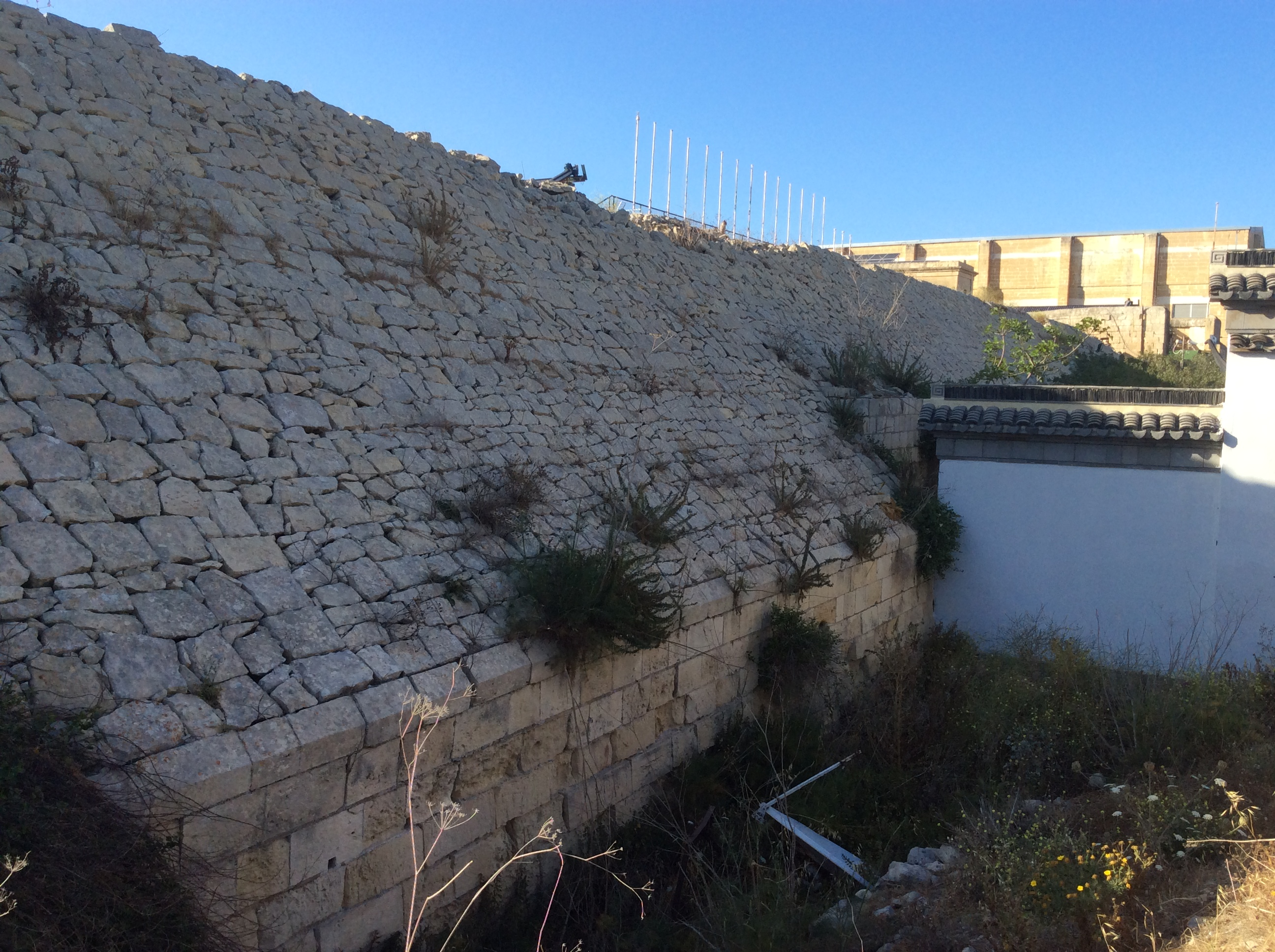

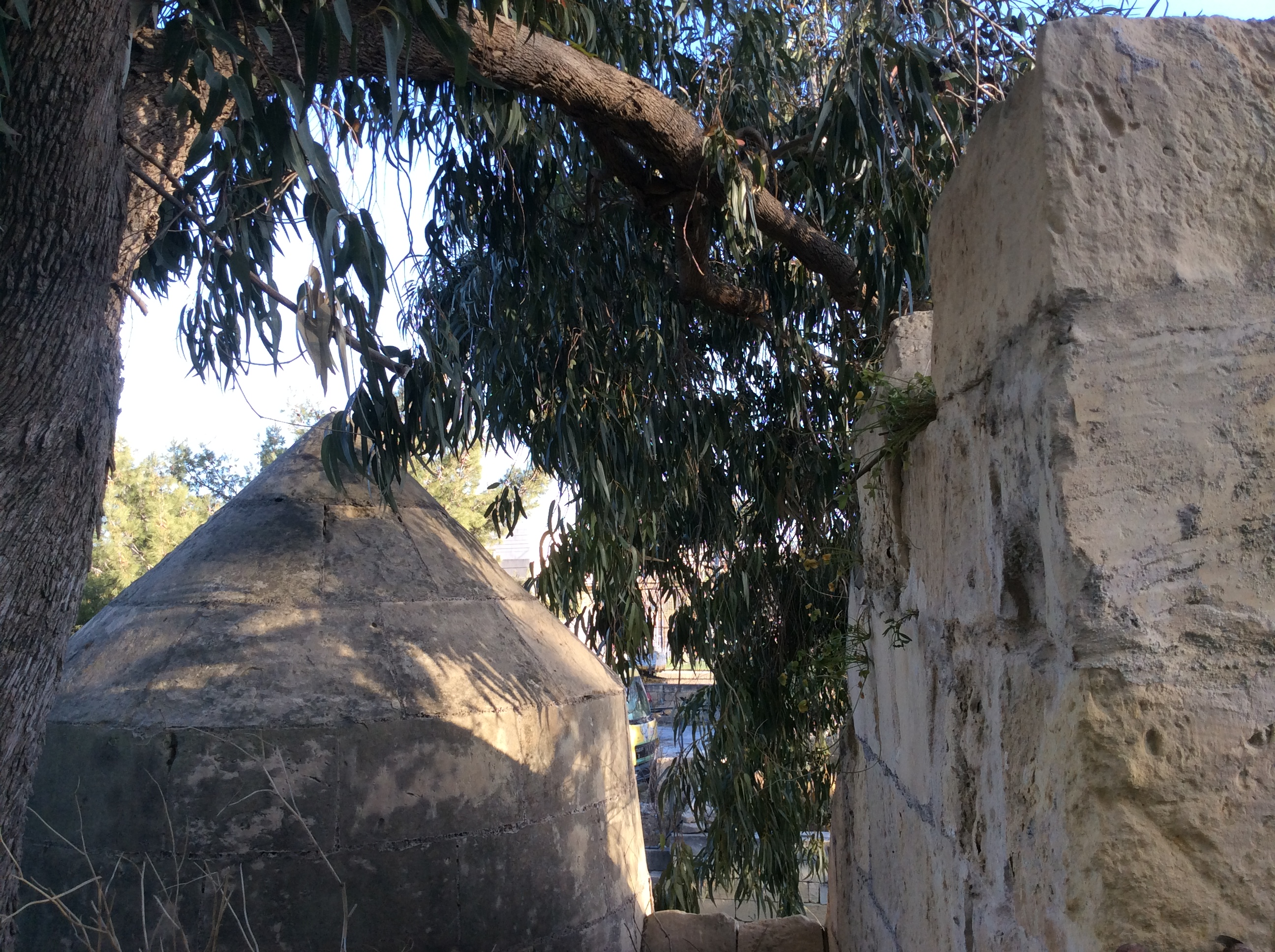

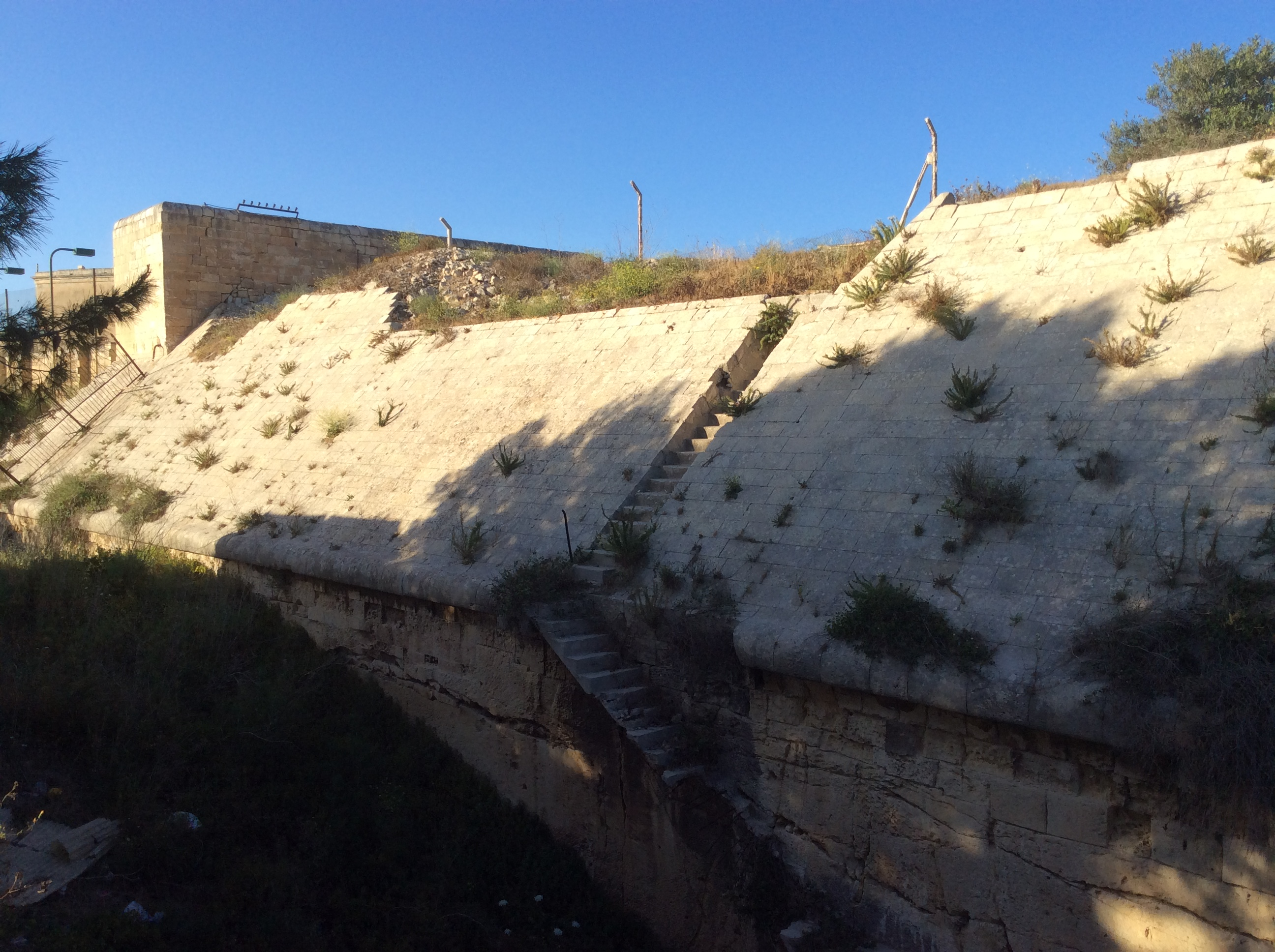

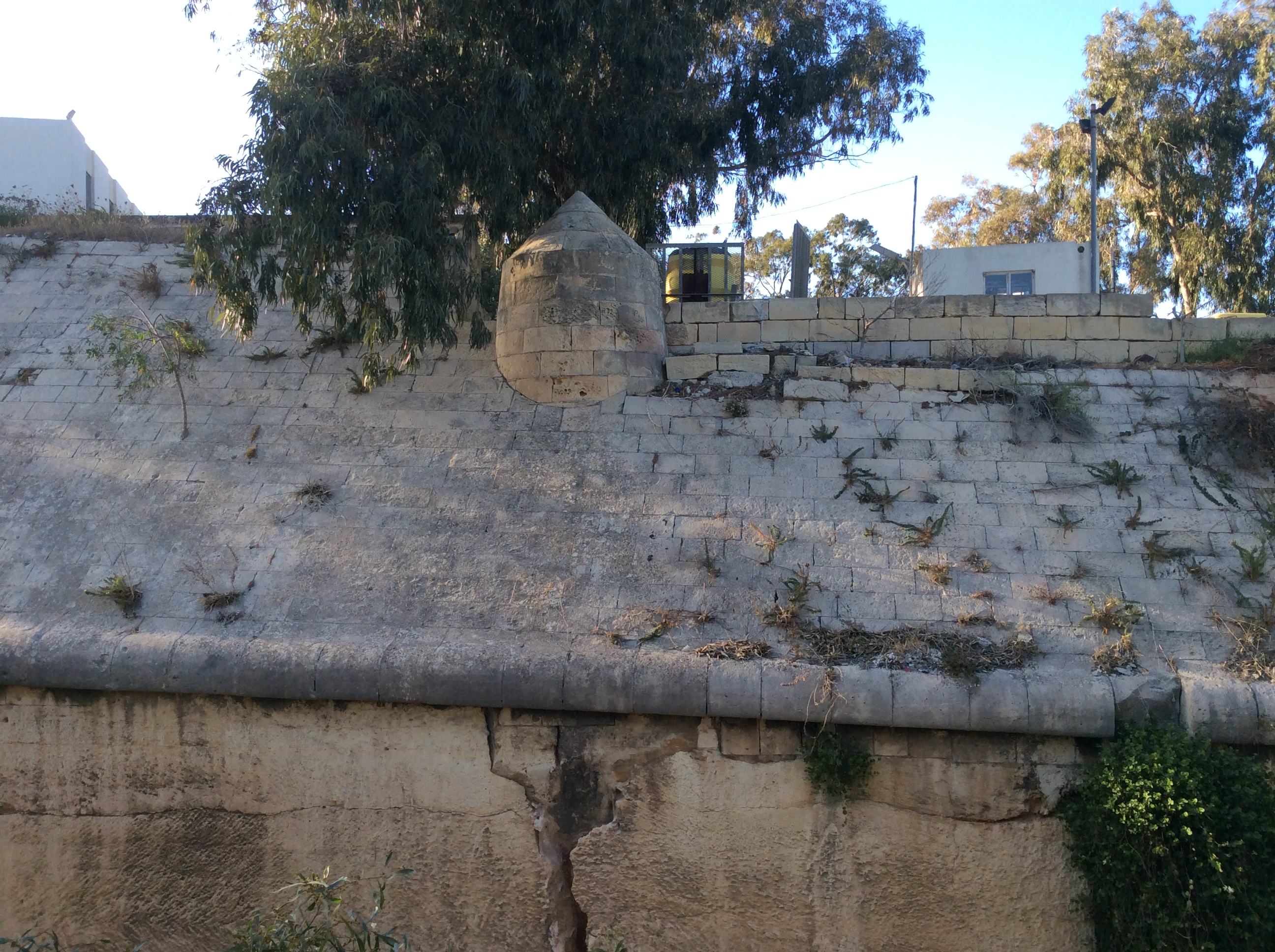

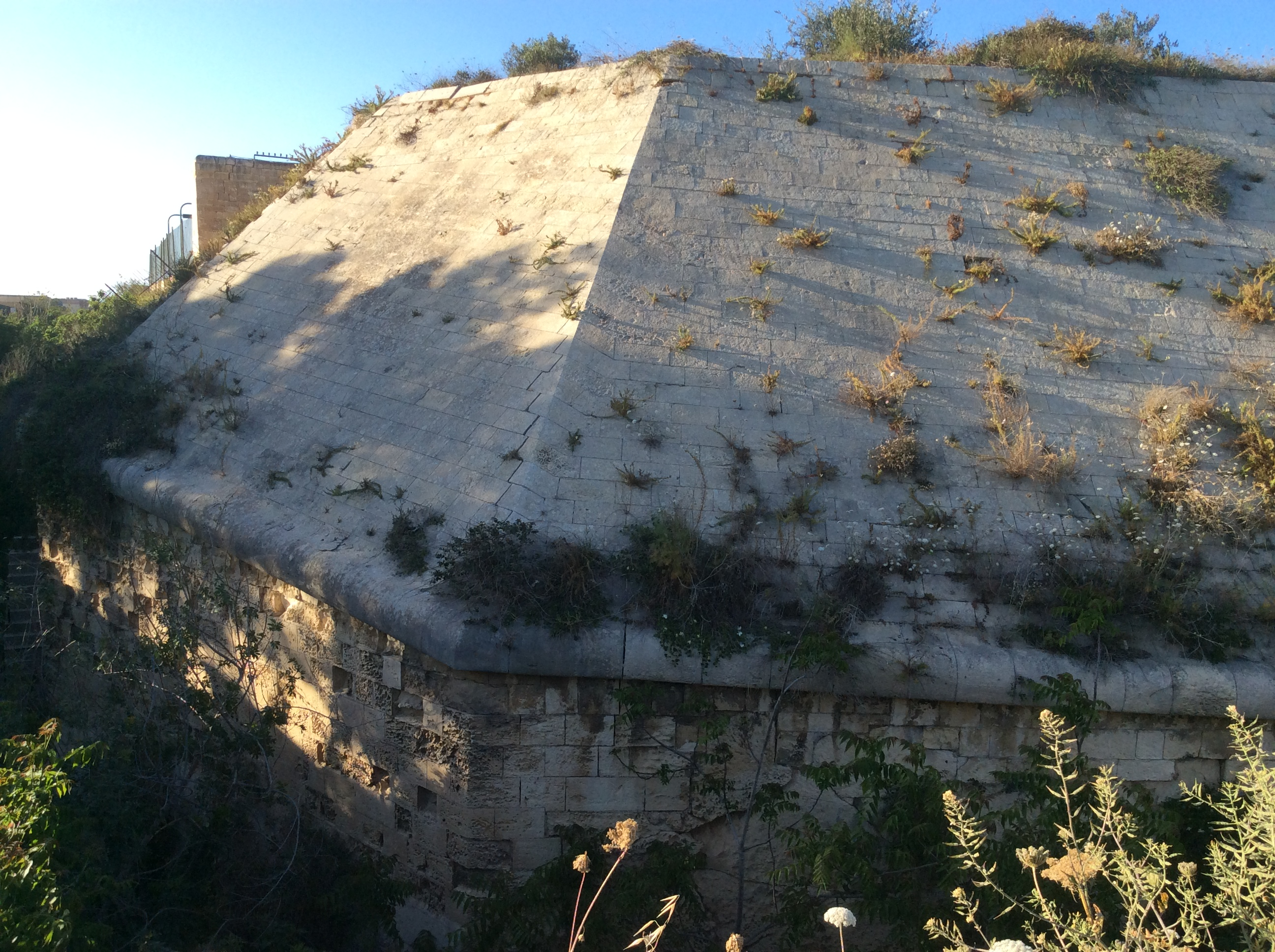

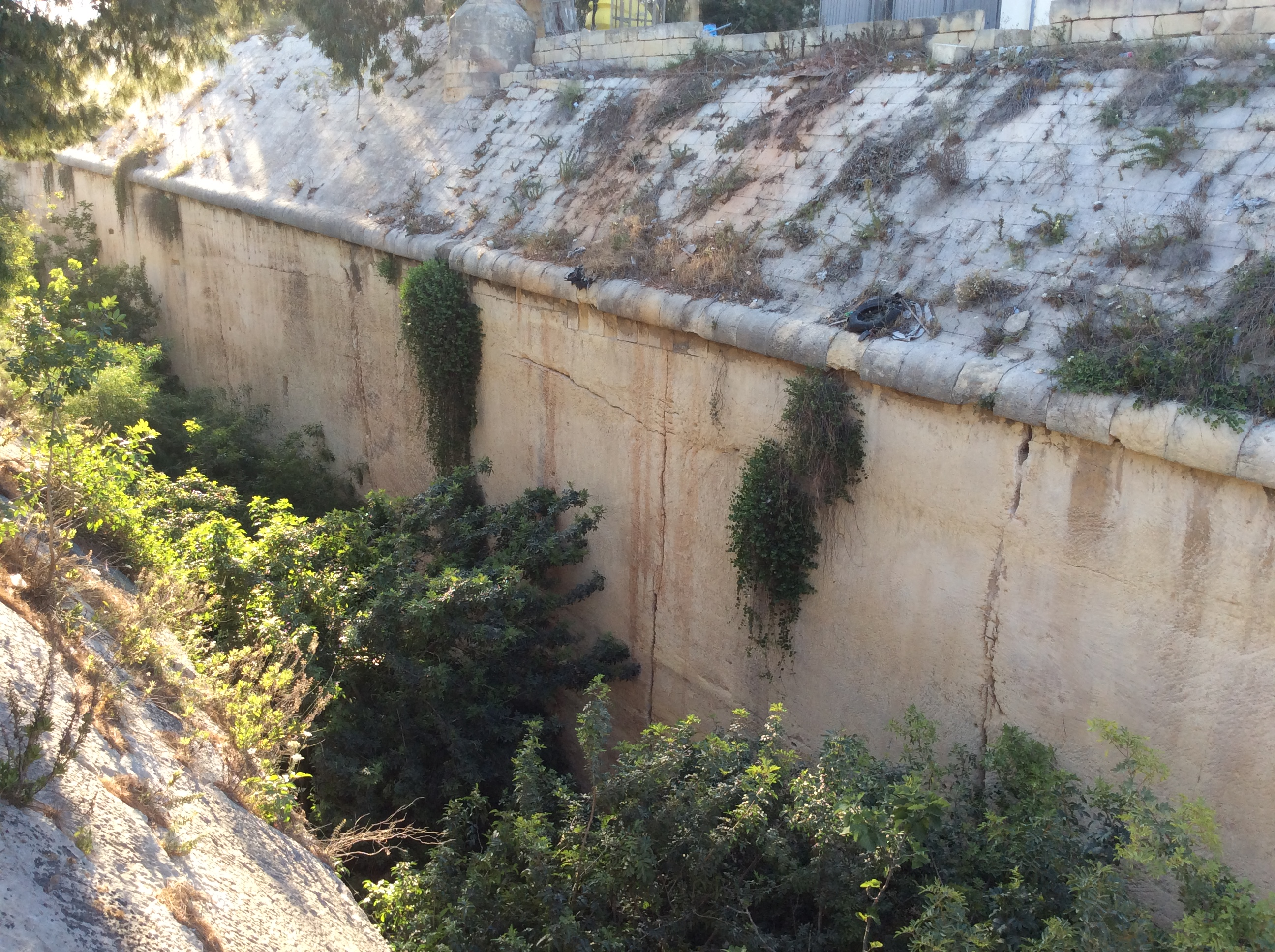

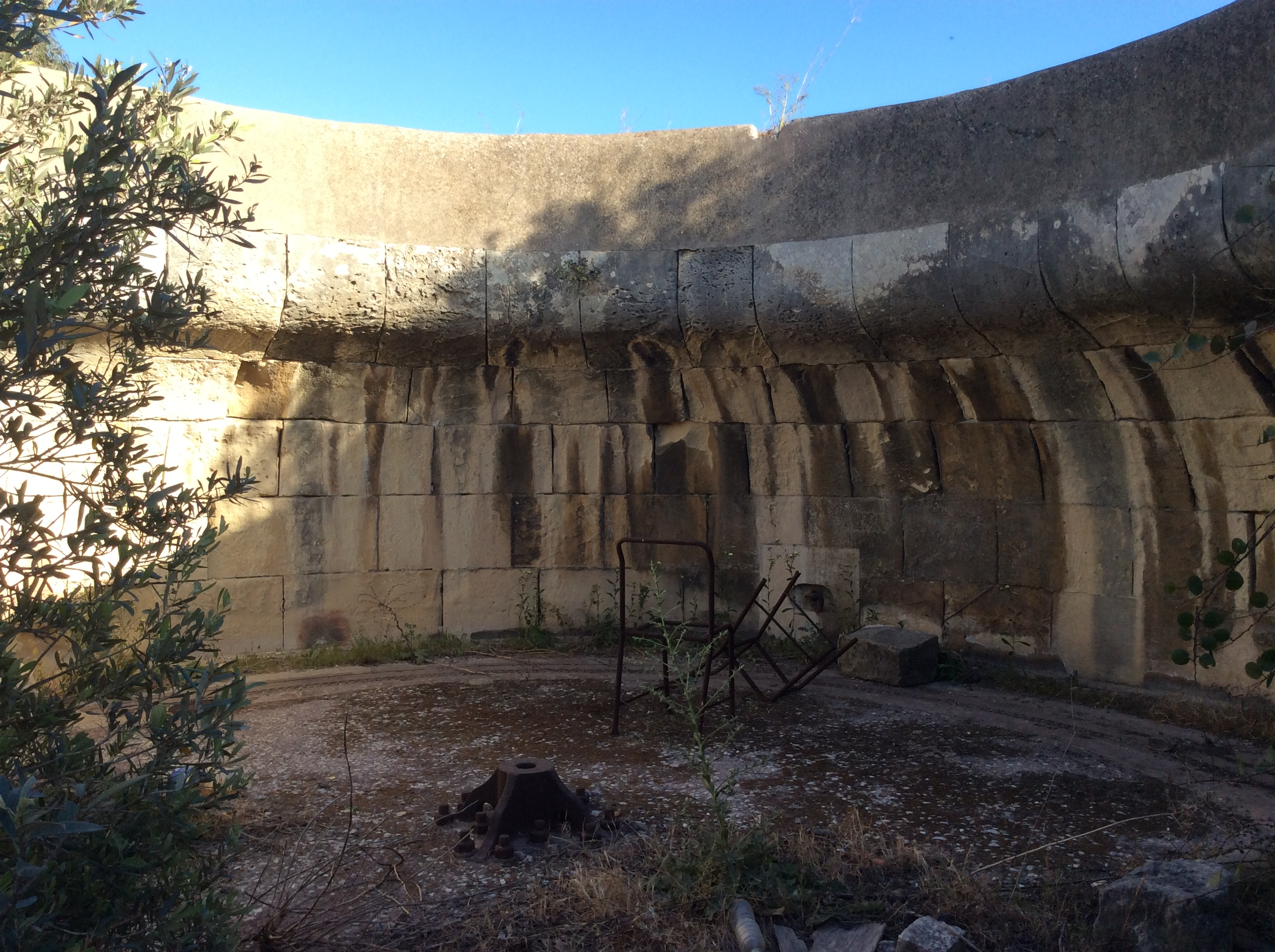
