= The European Journal of Lymphology and Related Problems =

- Discipline: Lymphology
- Language: English
- Edited by: Francesco Boccardo

Publication details
- History: 1990-present
- Publisher: European Society of Lymphology
- Frequency: Quarterly
- Open access: Yes

Standard abbreviations
- ISO 4: Eur. J. Lymphology Relat. Probl.

Indexing
- ISSN: 0778-5569
- OCLC no.: 30468692

Links
- Journal homepage; Online access

The European Journal of Lymphology and Related Problems is a quarterly peer-reviewed medical journal published by the European Society of Lymphology. The journal was established in 1990 and covers research in the fields of lymphology and related areas. The editor-in-chief is Francesco Boccardo (University of Genoa). In addition to the printed journal, content is distributed free of cost online in PDF format.

== Abstracting and indexing ==
The journal is abstracted and indexed in Embase and Scopus.
