= Windmill Redoubt =

- Ridott tal-Mitħna
- Part of the French blockade batteries
- Żabbar, Malta
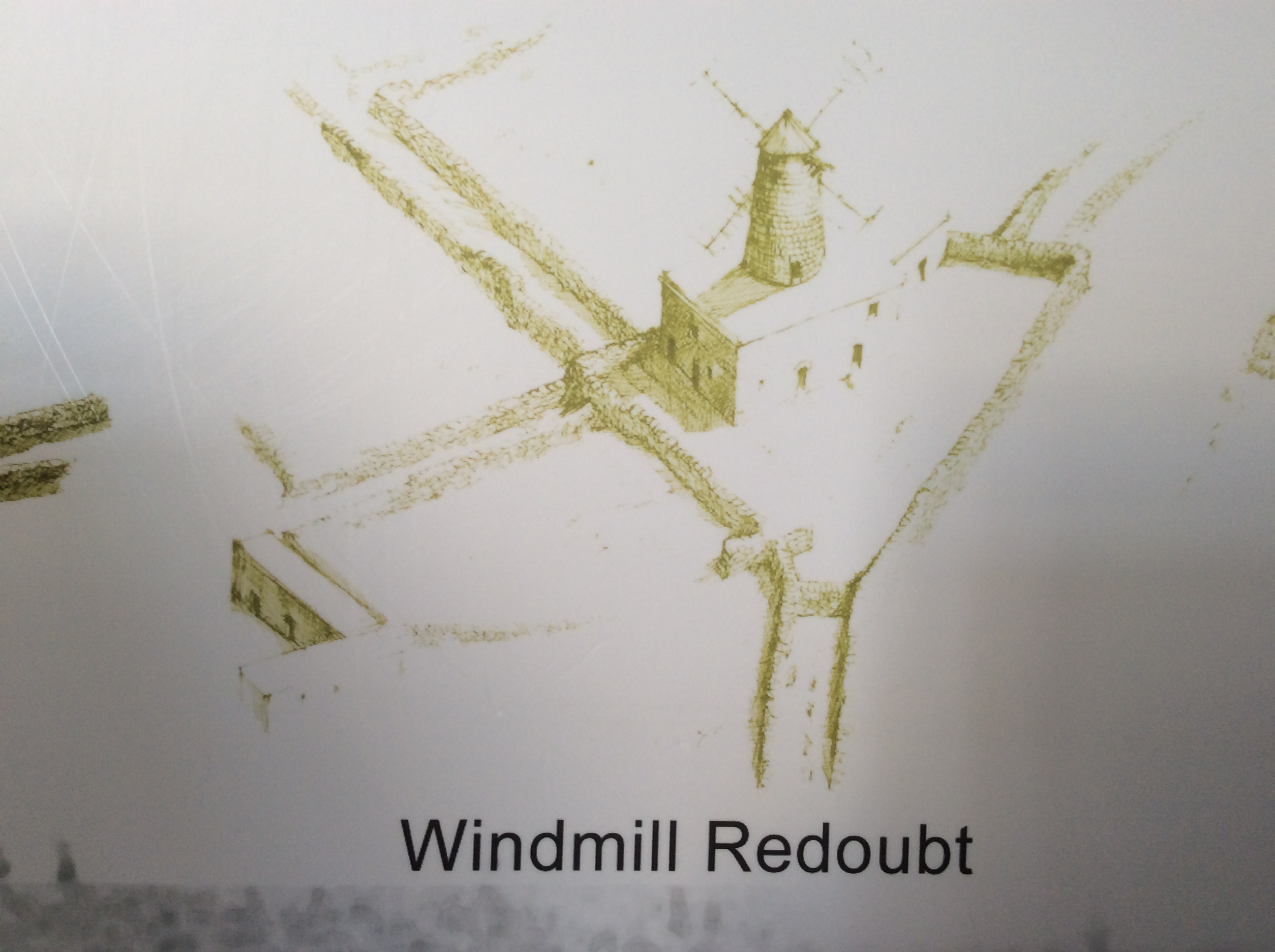
- Reconstruction of the Windmill Redoubt by Stephen C. Spiteri at the Fortifications Interpretation Centre

Site information
- Type: Redoubt

Location
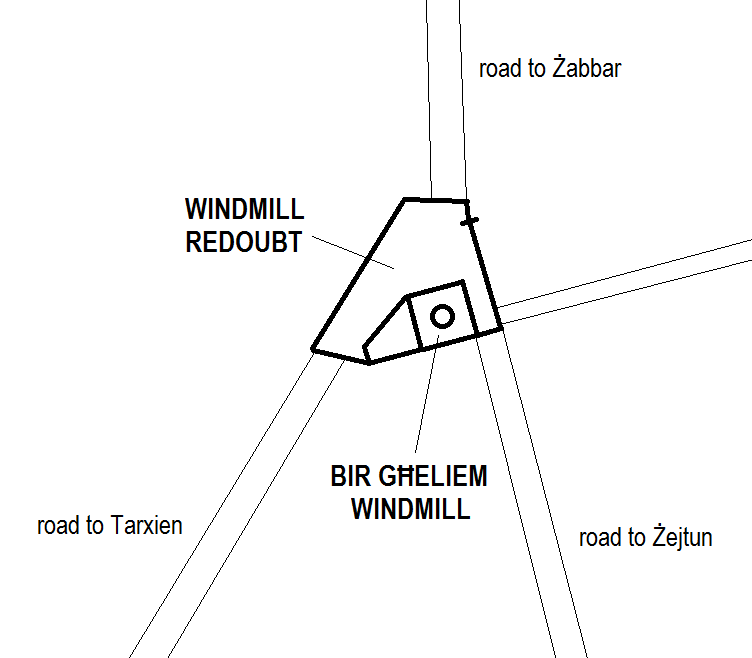
- Map of the Windmill Redoubt
- Coordinates: 35°52′10.7″N 14°31′37.9″E

Site history
- Built: c. 1798
- Built by: Maltese insurgents
- In use: c. 1798–1800
- Materials: Limestone
- Fate: Demolished
- Battles/wars: Siege of Malta (1798–1800)

Windmill Redoubt (Maltese: Ridott tal-Mitħna) was a redoubt in Żabbar, Malta. It was built by Maltese insurgents during the French blockade of 1798–1800. It was part of a chain of batteries, redoubts and entrenchments encircling the French positions in Marsamxett and the Grand Harbour.

The redoubt was built around a windmill known as Bir Għeliem, or Ta' Buleben, which had been built by Ramon Perellos y Roccaful in around 1710. The redoubt was located on the road between Żabbar and Tarxien, and was also linked to the road to Żejtun. The redoubt was built using rubble walls, and had a triangular shape, and was built in a way so as to block the roads between the three villages. The windmill occupied the south side of the redoubt, and was used as a blockhouse. The windmill's tower served as a lookout post. No details are known about the size of the garrison and the armament of the redoubt.

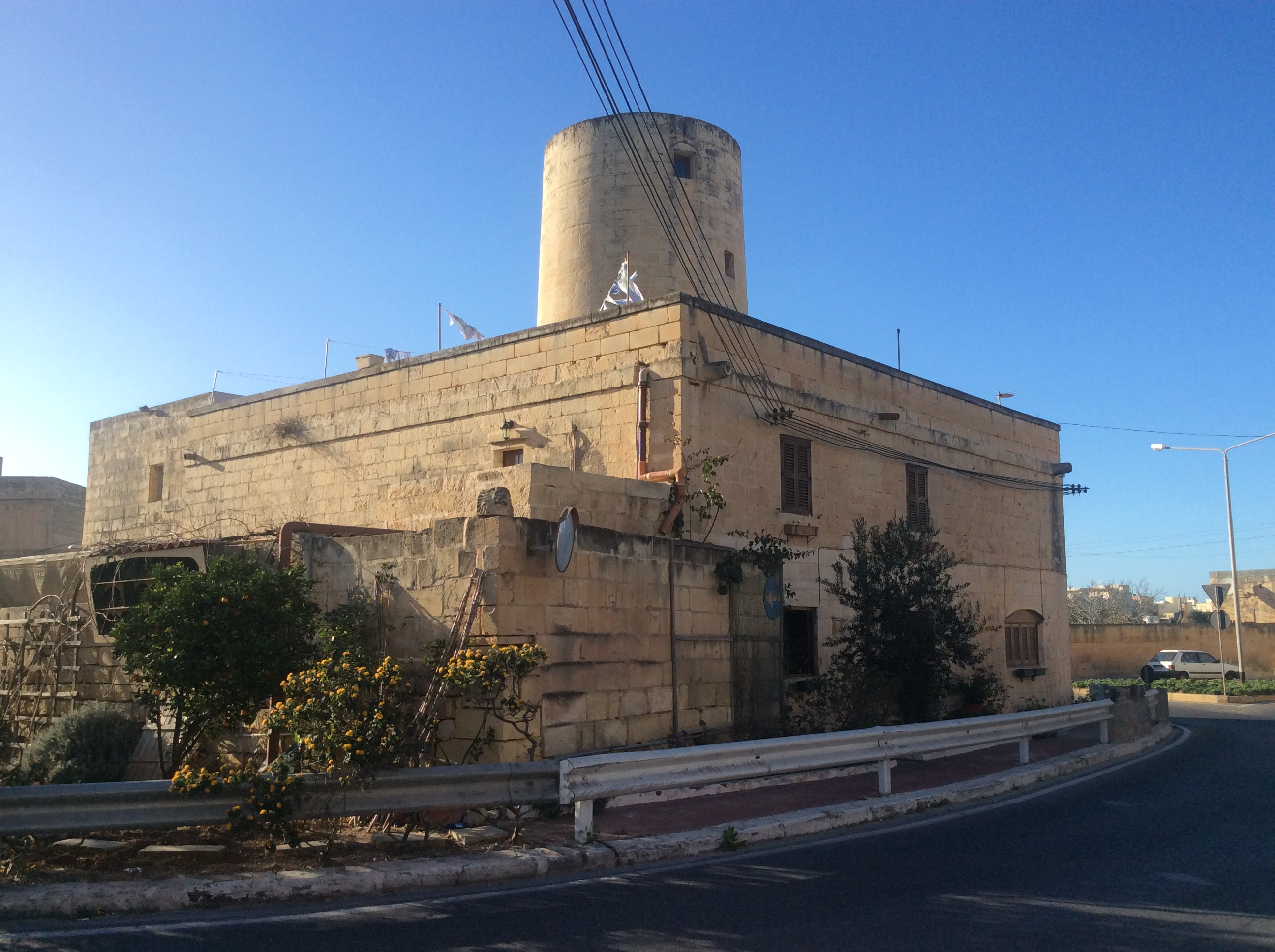
Bir Għeliem Windmill

The Windmill Redoubt was probably demolished soon after the end of the French blockade since it blocked important roads. The windmill itself still exists, with some modifications, and it now stands in the middle of a roundabout.
