= Angiology =

Branch of internal medicine, which deals with vascular disease

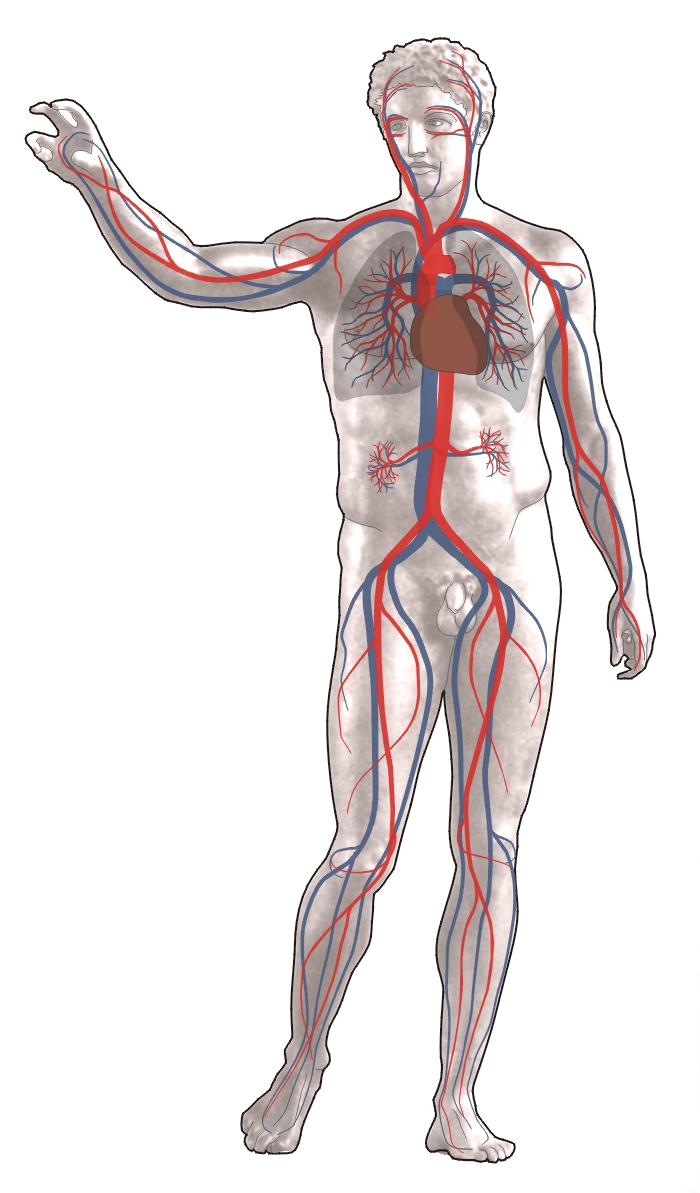
- The human circulatory system. Red indicates oxygenated blood, blue indicates deoxygenated.
- System: Circulatory
- Significant diseases: Vascular diseases; Atherosclerosis
- Specialist: Angiologist

Angiology (from Greek ἀγγεῖον, angeīon, "vessel"; and -λογία, -logia) is the medical specialty dedicated to studying the circulatory system and of the lymphatic system, i.e., arteries, veins and lymphatic vessels.

In the UK, this field is more often termed angiology, and in the United States the term vascular medicine is more frequent. The field of vascular medicine (angiology) is the field that deals with preventing, diagnosing, and treating lymphatic and blood vessel related diseases.

== Overview ==
Arterial diseases include the aorta (aneurysms/dissection) and arteries supplying the legs, hands, kidneys, brain, intestines. It also covers arterial thrombosis and embolism; vasculitides; and vasospastic disorders. Naturally, it deals with preventing cardiovascular diseases such as heart attack and stroke. Venous diseases include venous thrombosis, chronic venous insufficiency, and varicose veins. Lymphatic diseases include primary and secondary forms of lymphedema. It also involves modification of risk factors for vascular disease like high cholesterol, high blood pressure.

Cardiovascular risk factors such high blood pressure, elevated cholesterol and others fall under the specialty of vascular medicine.

== Vascular medicine training ==
Vascular medicine (angiology) training is well established in some European countries. The first European educational Working Group was born in 1991 in Milan (EWMA) becoming in 1998 a European Scientific Association VAS Vascular Independent Research and Education European Organization with several European educational programmes: European Fellowship, European Master, CESMA-UEMS European Diploma and Postgrad Courses. In the United States there are several independent vascular medicine training programs and twelve NIH funded three-year programs as well. These programs are suitable for either Internal medicine specialists as a fellowship or for cardiologists. In 2005, the first vascular medicine boards were administered by the American Board of Vascular Medicine. For current education and training in vascular medicine, see Society for Vascular Medicine.
