= List of monuments in Żejtun =

This is a list of monuments in Żejtun, Malta, which are listed on the National Inventory of the Cultural Property of the Maltese Islands.

== List ==
Name of object	Location	Coordinates	ID	Photo	Upload
Ħal Ġinwi temple	Sqaq Xrob il-Għaġin Nru. 8	35°50′50″N 14°32′50″E	00010		Upload Photo
Villa Cagliares	Triq Dun Mikiel Cassar	35°51′34″N 14°32′11″E	01247	Villa Cagliares	Upload Photo
Cemetery of St. Roque	Triq Id-Dahla Ta' San Tumas	35°51′10″N 14°32′18″E	01248	Cemetery of St. Roque	Upload Photo
Il-Gnien Tal-Kmand	Triq Xrob il-Għaġin c/w Triq Id-Dahla Ta' San Tumas	35°51′08″N 14°32′16″E	01249	Il-Gnien Tal-Kmand	Upload Photo
Church of the Madonna of Mercy	Triq il-Madonna tal-Ħniena c/w Misraħ Dom Mintoff	35°51′03″N 14°31′36″E	01896	Church of the Madonna of Mercy	Upload Photo
Niche of St Joseph	122 Triq il-Madonna tal-Ħniena c/w 16 Triq Melchiore Gafa	35°51′04″N 14°31′42″E	01897	Niche of St Joseph	Upload Photo
Niche of St Joseph	80 Triq il-Madonna tal-Ħniena c/w 1 Triq Lorenzo Gafà	35°51′05″N 14°31′45″E	01898	Niche of St Joseph	Upload Photo
Niche of the Madonna of Lourdes	"Anglu u Manni", 5 Triq Lorenzo Gafà	35°51′06″N 14°31′45″E	01899	Niche of the Madonna of Lourdes	Upload Photo
Niche of the Madonna of Mount Carmel	"Angela", 7 Triq Lorenzo Gafà	35°51′06″N 14°31′45″E	01900	Niche of the Madonna of Mount Carmel	Upload Photo
Niche of the Assumption	9/11 Triq Lorenzo Gafà	35°51′06″N 14°31′44″E	01901	Niche of the Assumption	Upload Photo
Niche of the Sacred Heart of Mary	"Ir-Remissa", 74 Triq il-Madonna tal-Ħniena	35°51′06″N 14°31′46″E	01902	Niche of the Sacred Heart of Mary	Upload Photo
Niche of Christ the King	68 Triq il-Madonna tal-Ħniena c/w Triq San Ġwann	35°51′06″N 14°31′47″E	01903	Niche of Christ the King	Upload Photo
Niche of St. Anthony of Padua	"St. Rita", 55 Triq il-Madonna tal-Ħniena	35°51′06″N 14°31′47″E	01904	Niche of St. Anthony of Padua	Upload Photo
Niche of the Crucifix	"Richard House", 45 Triq il-Madonna tal-Ħniena	35°51′07″N 14°31′48″E	01905	Niche of the Crucifix	Upload Photo
Niche of the Madonna of Sorrows	35 Triq il-Madonna tal-Ħniena	35°51′08″N 14°31′49″E	01906	Niche of the Madonna of Sorrows	Upload Photo
Chapel of our Lady	14 Triq il-Madonna tal-Ħniena	35°51′10″N 14°31′50″E	01907	Chapel of our Lady	Upload Photo
Chapel of St. Mary	Misraħ Santa Marija	35°51′10″N 14°31′53″E	01908	Chapel of St. Mary	Upload Photo
Niche of the Madonna of the Rosary	Triq San Mikiel	35°51′09″N 14°31′51″E	01909	Niche of the Madonna of the Rosary	Upload Photo
Niche of St Michael	Triq San Mikiel	35°51′09″N 14°31′51″E	01910	Niche of St Michael	Upload Photo
Chapel of St. Angelo	Triq San Pawl c/w Misraħ Karlu Diacono	35°51′13″N 14°31′53″E	01911	Chapel of St. Angelo	Upload Photo
Niche of Prophet Daniel	Aedes Danielis, Misraħ Karlu Diacono	35°51′13″N 14°31′54″E	01912	Niche of Prophet Daniel	Upload Photo
Niche of St. Rita	2 Triq Luqa Briffa	35°51′13″N 14°31′54″E	01913	Niche of St. Rita	Upload Photo
Chapel of Our Lady of good Counsel	Misraħ Karlu Diacono c/w Triq il-Madonna Tal-Bon Kunsill	35°51′13″N 14°31′55″E	01914	Chapel of Our Lady of good Counsel	Upload Photo
Niche of the Madonna of the Rosary	Sqaq il-Madonna Tal-Bon Kunsill	35°51′15″N 14°31′55″E	01915	Niche of the Madonna of the Rosary	Upload Photo
Niche of St. John the Baptist	11 Triq il-Madonna Tal-Bon Kunsill	35°51′14″N 14°31′56″E	01916	Niche of St. John the Baptist	Upload Photo
Crucifix (removed)	43/44 Misraħ Gregorio Bonici	35°51′17″N 14°31′58″E	01917	Crucifix (removed)	Upload Photo
Parish Cross	Misraħ Gregorio Bonici	35°51′17″N 14°31′59″E	01918	Parish Cross	Upload Photo
Statue of St. Roque	Misraħ ir-Repubblika (opposite No. 1 - BOV)	35°51′18″N 14°31′59″E	01919	Statue of St. Roque	Upload Photo
Statue of St. Catherine	Misraħ ir-Repubblika (opposite No. 9)	35°51′19″N 14°32′00″E	01920	Statue of St. Catherine	Upload Photo
Parish Church of St. Catherine	Misraħ ir-Repubblika	35°51′19″N 14°32′01″E	01921	Parish Church of St. Catherine	Upload Photo
Niche of the Assumption	191 Triq Santa Marija (opposite Sqaq Santa Marija Nru. 1)	35°51′14″N 14°31′57″E	01922	Niche of the Assumption	Upload Photo
Niche of St. Lawrence	15 Triq Santa Marija c/w Sqaq Santa Marija Nru. 1	35°51′14″N 14°31′58″E	01923	Niche of St. Lawrence	Upload Photo
Niche of the Immaculate Conception	20/21 Triq Santa Marija	35°51′13″N 14°31′58″E	01924	Niche of the Immaculate Conception	Upload Photo
Niche of St Joseph	25 Triq Santa Marija	35°51′12″N 14°31′58″E	01925	Niche of St Joseph	Upload Photo
Niche of the Madonna of Mount Carmel	24 Triq Santa Marija c/w Triq Sant Emidju	35°51′13″N 14°31′58″E	01926	Niche of the Madonna of Mount Carmel	Upload Photo
Niche of St. Catherine	Triq Santa Marija	35°51′11″N 14°31′55″E	01927	Niche of St. Catherine	Upload Photo
Niche of the Madonna of the Rosary	Triq Santa Marija	35°51′10″N 14°31′54″E	01928	Niche of the Madonna of the Rosary	Upload Photo
Niche of the Crucifix	76 Triq Santa Marija	35°51′07″N 14°31′51″E	01929	Niche of the Crucifix	Upload Photo
Niche of the Madonna of Mount Carmel	46 Triq il-Madonna Tal-Bon Kunsill	35°51′16″N 14°31′58″E	01930	Niche of the Madonna of Mount Carmel	Upload Photo
Statue of St. Gregory	Triq San Girgor (next to the church)	35°51′12″N 14°32′17″E	01931	Statue of St. Gregory	Upload Photo
St. Catherine's Old Church	Triq San Girgor	35°51′11″N 14°32′18″E	01932	St. Catherine's Old Church	Upload Photo
Niche of the Madonna of Lourdes	76 Triq San Girgor	35°51′15″N 14°32′13″E	01933	Niche of the Madonna of Lourdes	Upload Photo
Church of Jesus of Nazareth	Triq San Girgor c/w Triq L-Isqof Emmanuel Galea	35°51′16″N 14°32′13″E	01934	Church of Jesus of Nazareth	Upload Photo
Niche of the Sacred Heart of Jesus	Triq il-President Anton Buttigieg (next to the car park opposite Triq il-Għadam)	35°50′57″N 14°31′36″E	01935	Niche of the Sacred Heart of Jesus	Upload Photo
Statue of St. Paul	33 Triq Marsaxlokk	35°51′07″N 14°31′55″E	01936	Statue of St. Paul	Upload Photo
Niche of Bishop St. Nicholas	41 Triq Marsaxlokk	35°51′06″N 14°31′55″E	01937	Niche of Bishop St. Nicholas	Upload Photo
Niche of St Joseph	Triq Marsaxlokk c/w Triq San Pietru	35°51′06″N 14°31′54″E	01938	Niche of St Joseph	Upload Photo
Relief of St. Francis Saverio	81 Triq Marsaxlokk	35°51′03″N 14°31′55″E	01939	Relief of St. Francis Saverio	Upload Photo
Niche of St. Catherine	Triq San Duminku c/w 2 Triq San Alfonsu	35°51′04″N 14°31′49″E	01940	Niche of St. Catherine	Upload Photo
Niche of Christ the Redeemer	39 Triq San Duminku c/w Triq San Alfonsu	35°51′04″N 14°31′50″E	01941	Niche of Christ the Redeemer	Upload Photo
Niche of the Madonna of Mount Carmel	"Dreams", 4 Sqaq San Duminku Nru. 2	35°51′04″N 14°31′47″E	01942	Niche of the Madonna of Mount Carmel	Upload Photo
Niche of the Madonna of Mount Carmel	2 Triq Marsaxlokk	35°51′11″N 14°31′56″E	01943	Niche of the Madonna of Mount Carmel	Upload Photo
Niche of St. Catherine	17 Triq Xejba	35°51′09″N 14°31′59″E	01944	Niche of St. Catherine	Upload Photo
Niche of the Madonna of Mount Carmel	Triq Santa Monika c/w Triq Luqa Briffa	35°51′10″N 14°32′03″E	01945	Niche of the Madonna of Mount Carmel	Upload Photo
Niche of St. Catherine	Triq Santa Fawstina	35°51′12″N 14°32′05″E	01946	Niche of St. Catherine	Upload Photo
Statue of Sacred Heart of Jesus	2 Triq Santa Fawstina	35°51′12″N 14°32′03″E	01947	Statue of Sacred Heart of Jesus	Upload Photo
Statue of St. Roque	Triq Santa Fawstina c/w 53 Triq il-Ħerba	35°51′12″N 14°32′02″E	01948	Statue of St. Roque	Upload Photo
Statue of St. Catherine	Triq Santa Fawstina c/w 53 Triq il-Ħerba	35°51′12″N 14°32′02″E	01949	Statue of St. Catherine	Upload Photo
Relief of the Madonna of Sorrows	10 Sqaq il-Ħerba Nru. 2	35°51′14″N 14°32′00″E	01950	Relief of the Madonna of Sorrows	Upload Photo
Niche of St. Pascal Baylon	13/15 Triq L-Ispirtu s-Santu	35°51′19″N 14°31′55″E	01951	Niche of St. Pascal Baylon	Upload Photo
Statue of St. Theresa	24 Triq Santa Katarina c/w Triq L-Ispiritu s-Santu	35°51′21″N 14°31′55″E	01952	Statue of St. Theresa	Upload Photo
Chapel of the Holy Spirit	Triq Santa Katarina c/w Triq L-Ispiritu s-Santu	35°51′21″N 14°31′56″E	01953	Chapel of the Holy Spirit	Upload Photo
Niche of the Madonna of Mount Carmel	36 Triq Luqa Briffa	35°51′11″N 14°31′58″E	01954	Niche of the Madonna of Mount Carmel	Upload Photo
Niche of St Joseph	29 Triq San Porfirju	35°51′11″N 14°32′13″E	01955	Niche of St Joseph	Upload Photo
Niche of St. Catherine (former St. Anthony)	45 Triq San Piju X	35°51′12″N 14°32′08″E	01956	Niche of St. Catherine (former St. Anthony)	Upload Photo
Niche of the Immaculate Conception	85 Triq San Girgor	35°51′17″N 14°32′10″E	01957	Niche of the Immaculate Conception	Upload Photo
Niche of St Joseph	5 Triq Sant'Antnin	35°51′27″N 14°32′05″E	01958	Niche of St Joseph	Upload Photo
Niche of Madonna of Lourdes	20 Misraħ il-Bandolier	35°51′26″N 14°32′04″E	01959	Niche of Madonna of Lourdes	Upload Photo
Niche of the Madonna of Sorrows	21-22 Misraħ il-Bandolier	35°51′26″N 14°32′04″E	01960	Niche of the Madonna of Sorrows	Upload Photo
Niche of the Immaculate Conception	Triq San Ġorġ c/w Triq is-Salvatur	35°51′26″N 14°32′04″E	01961	Niche of the Immaculate Conception	Upload Photo
Niche of the Assumption	13 Triq is-Salvatur	35°51′25″N 14°32′04″E	01962	Niche of the Assumption	Upload Photo
Chapel of Christ the Saviour	Triq is-Salvatur	35°51′25″N 14°32′04″E	01963	Chapel of Christ the Saviour	Upload Photo
Niche of the Immaculate Conception	15 Misraħ il-Bandolier	35°51′27″N 14°32′04″E	01964	Niche of the Immaculate Conception	Upload Photo
Niche of the Crucifix	20 Misraħ il-Bjar	35°51′28″N 14°32′04″E	01965	Niche of the Crucifix	Upload Photo
Niche of the Crucifix	8 Misraħ il-Bjar	35°51′29″N 14°32′02″E	01966	Niche of the Crucifix	Upload Photo
Niche of the Madonna of the Rosary	53 Triq Dun Mikiel Cassar	35°51′31″N 14°32′08″E	01967	Niche of the Madonna of the Rosary	Upload Photo
Niche of the Madonna of Mount Carmel	Triq Sant'Agata	35°51′32″N 14°32′09″E	01968	Niche of the Madonna of Mount Carmel	Upload Photo
Niche of the Crucifix	15 Triq Taltas	35°51′32″N 14°32′12″E	01969	Niche of the Crucifix	Upload Photo
Niche of the Madonna of the Girdle	"Geocarm", 35 Triq Taltas	35°51′31″N 14°32′12″E	01970	Niche of the Madonna of the Girdle	Upload Photo
Chapel of St. Clement	Triq San Klement	35°51′37″N 14°31′57″E	01971	Chapel of St. Clement	Upload Photo
Niche of the Madonna of the Rosary	"Casa Perellos", 53 Triq Santa Katerina	35°51′21″N 14°31′53″E	01972	Niche of the Madonna of the Rosary	Upload Photo
Niche of the Madonna of light	Triq Xrob il-Għaġin c/w Sqaq Xrob il-Għaġin Nru. 3	35°51′00″N 14°32′40″E	01973		Upload Photo
Empty niche of the Assumption	Triq Xrob il-Għaġin c/w Sqaq Xrob il-Għaġin Nru. 6	35°50′56″N 14°32′43″E	01974		Upload Photo
Niche of St Joseph	Triq Xrob il-Għaġin c/w Triq Strejnu	35°50′56″N 14°32′50″E	01975	Niche of St Joseph	Upload Photo
Chapel of St. Nicholas	Triq Xrob il-Għaġin c/w Triq Strejnu	35°50′56″N 14°32′51″E	01976	Chapel of St. Nicholas	Upload Photo
Niche of the Madonna of the Rosary	Triq Strejnu c/w Triq id-Daħla ta' San Tumas	35°51′19″N 14°32′59″E	01977		Upload Photo
Chapel of St. Mary of Ħal Tmin	Triq Wied iż-Żiju	35°51′21″N 14°32′56″E	01978	Chapel of St. Mary of Ħal Tmin	Upload Photo
Niche of St Michael	Triq San Luċjan	35°51′21″N 14°31′58″E	01979	Niche of St Michael	Upload Photo
Aedis Danielis	28–30 Misraħ Karlu Diacono	35°51′13″N 14°31′54″E	02564	more files	Upload Photo
Pandora Theatre	13 Triq il-Ħerba		02569		Upload Photo
Perellos Estate	18 Sqaq il-Merħla, Qasam Industrijali ta' Bulebel		02570		Upload Photo
Lapida Notarili fuq binja vernakolari	18 Triq Ħal Tarxien		02571		Upload Photo
Gallarija tal-ġebel fuq binja vernakolari	55 Triq Ħal Tarxien		02572		Upload Photo
Villa Arrigo (Casamento 77)	102 Triq Marsaxlokk		02573		Upload Photo
14 Triq il-Madonna tal-Ħniena	14 Triq il-Madonna tal-Ħniena		02574		Upload Photo
Palazzino 1787	22 Triq Sant' Anġlu		02575		Upload Photo
14 Triq Santa Katarina	14 Triq Santa Katarina		02576		Upload Photo
81 Triq Marsaxlokk	81 Triq Marsaxlokk		02577		Upload Photo
Torri Vendome	11 Triq San Pawl	35°50′14″N 14°32′40″E	02578	more files	Upload Photo
Ta’ Ġużeppi	Triq Anġlu Delia k/m Triq Marsaxlokk		02579		Upload Photo
L-Għajn tal-Bhejjem	Triq Joe Attard		02580		Upload Photo
40 Triq Santa Katarina	40 Triq Santa Katarina		02581		Upload Photo
Dar San Ġużepp	12 Triq San Luċjan		02582		Upload Photo
Dar ir-Rikonċiljazzjoni	Triq Santa Katarina		02583		Upload Photo
Casa Perellos	53 Triq Santa Katarina		02584		Upload Photo
Mitħna tal-Fwar	Triq l-Aħħar Ħbit mit-Torok, Triq Ħaż-Żabbar, Triq Bormla and Wesgħet l-Għajn tal-Bhejjem		02585		Upload Photo
