= Bon Kunsill Church, Żejtun =

Bon Kunsill Church
- The Church of Our Lady of Good Counsel
- Knisja tal-Madonna tal-Bon Kunsill
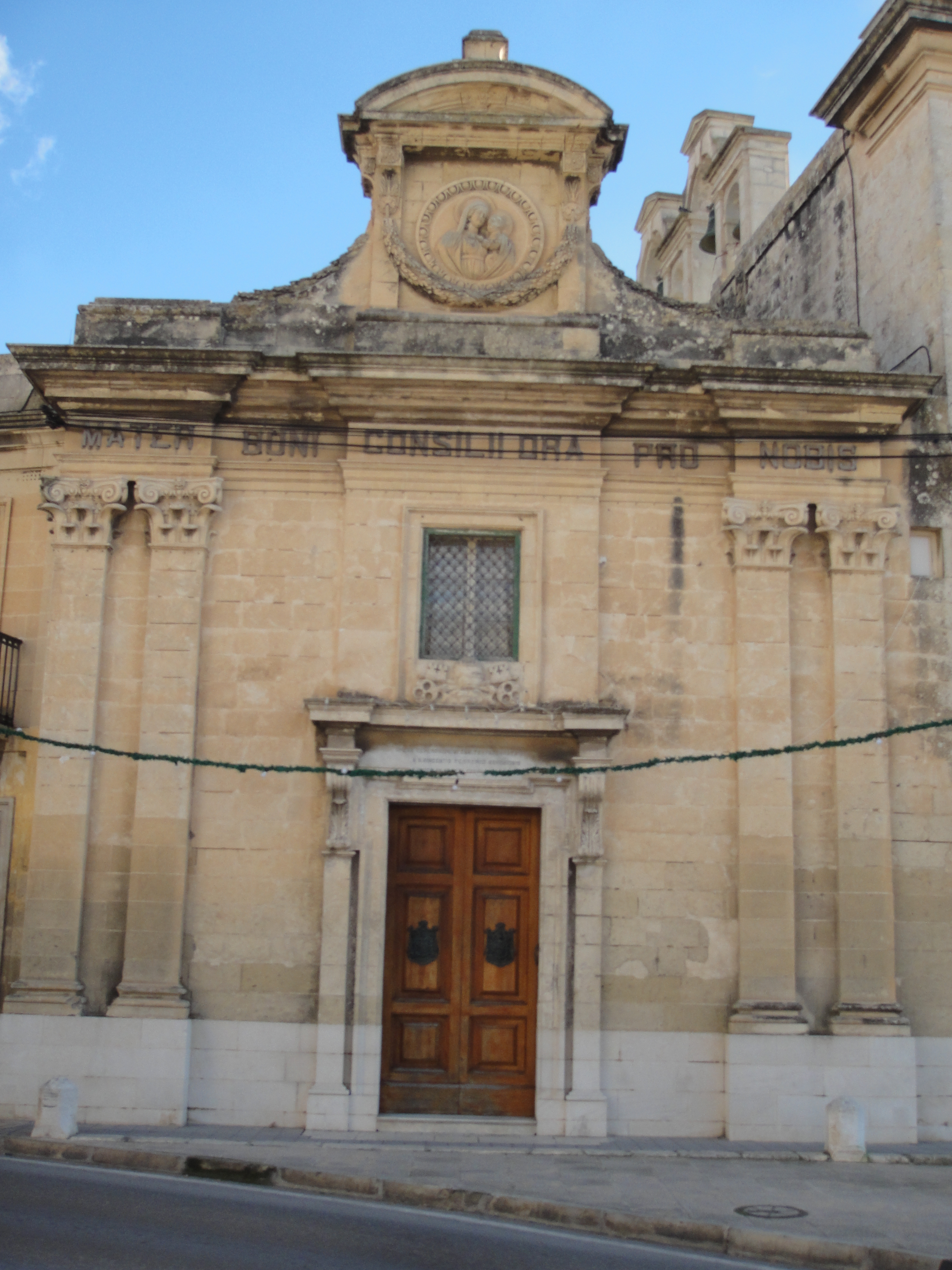

- Location within Malta
- 35°51′13.3″N 14°31′54.6″E
- Location: Żejtun
- Country: Malta
- Denomination: Roman Catholic

History
- Founder: Neriku Testaferrata
- Dedication: Our Lady of Good Counsel

Administration
- Archdiocese: Malta

Our Lady of Good Counsel Church (Maltese: Il-Knisja tal-Madonna tal-Bon Kunsill), is a church located in Żejtun, Malta.

== History ==
The church is the private chapel of the adjacent Ædes Danielis built by the Testaferrata Bonici family who also built the nearby St Angelo's Church.

A permission to build the chapel was given on 7 April, 1753. through the initiative of Neriku Testaferrata and blessed by Archbishop Paul Alphéran de Bussan.

The chapel was consecrated by Archbishop Pietro Pace on December 8, 1891.

In the 1980s the church was ransacked and a sizable amount of priceless valuables were stolen. The church remains the private property of the Testaferrata Bonnici family.

== See also ==
- Ædes Danielis
- Catholic Church in Malta
