= Danielis (surname) =

Danielis is a surname. Notable people with the surname include:

- Daniel Danielis (1635–1696), Belgian composer
- Servius Danielis or Maurus Servius Honoratus, fourth-century Italian grammarian

For other uses see also Ædes Danielis
