= Żejtun Roman villa =

- Villa Rumana taż-Żejtun (Maltese)
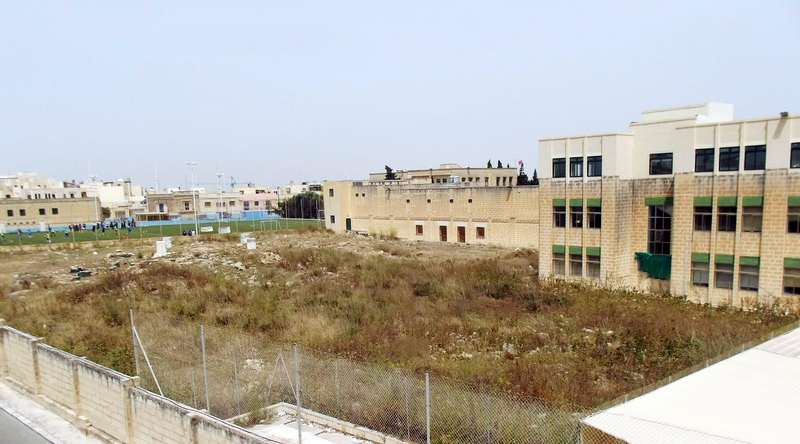
- The Roman villa complex in Żejtun.

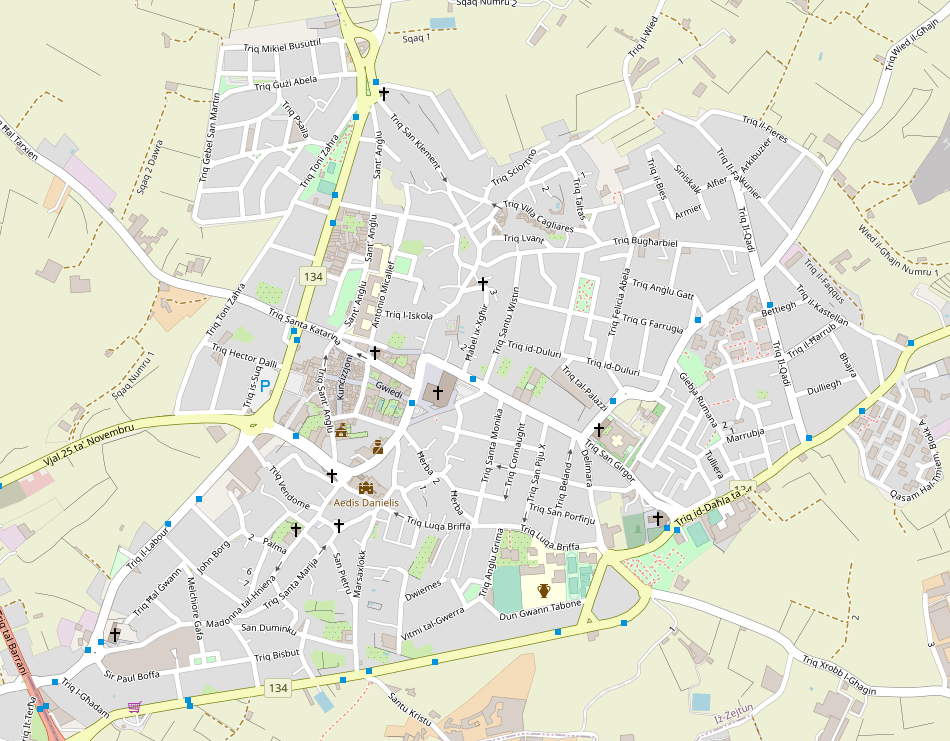
- Location within Zejtun Location within Malta
- 35°51′6.12″N 14°32′8.304″E
- Type: Settlement
- Periods: Late Bronze–Early Byzantine
- Cultures: Borġ in-Nadur phase, Phoenician, Roman
- Location: Żejtun, Malta

Site notes
- Owner: Public
- Public access: Restricted
- Partly unexcavated, within the grounds of a public school

The Żejtun Roman villa is an archaeological complex in the city of Żejtun, in south-eastern Malta. The open-air remains contain areas of original Roman tiling and coloured stucco. The complex was an active settlement since the Bronze Age, although the presently visible remains can be mainly dated from the Punic period right up to Late Antiquity. The site was discovered in 1961, with the complex being the subject of two large-scale archaeological investigations, the first of which was carried out in the 1970s.

More evidence of ancient habitation in the area comes from burial grounds, such as those around St Gregory's Church, Tal-Barrani, Tal-Ħotba and Bulebel. The excavation site at the villa confirms the presence of a thriving olive oil industry on the southern end of the islands.

The site is located in the grounds of the St Thomas More Secondary School in Żejtun.

== Topography ==
The remains rest on the highest point of a long, flat ridge stretching in an east-west direction. The villa can be found close to the eastern end of the ridge. Beyond the secondary school grounds on the east side, the ridge dips significantly towards Tas-Silġ and Delimara, along the main road leading to these destinations. The ridge dips gently to the north and south, beyond the main road. The road maintains more or less the same altitude to the west until Bir id-Deheb, with the ground rising again towards Gudja and the parish church of Ħal Għaxaq. The remains, therefore, are a couple of metres higher than the old parish church of Saint Catherine's (the present St Gregory's church) and considerably higher than the present Żejtun parish church.

== Discovery and excavation ==
Local people had known of the existence of ancient remains in the vicinity, it was not until 1964 that archaeologists systematically excavated the site, which had been accidentally uncovered by workmen when a school was being built. Various Punic and Roman tombs were discovered in the area around Żejtun, the most interesting being the burial complex at Tal-Barrani, with evidence of substantial restructuring in the 7th century. On 8 April 1963 a tomb was discovered and investigated by the local authorities "in the field immediately to the east of the new village school." It contained both Punic and Roman material, including a "third century lamp, a glass unguentarium…and a large peg based amphora split to serve as a child's sarcophagus" The villa continued to be used as an olive oil-producing establishment until the end of the third century AD.

No signs of the ancient remains were apparent in the fields before 1961, when "traces of masonry and some pottery came to light" during the building of a new school for the village. The authorities' investigations deemed the remains to be "slight", with no further action being taken. The discovery of more remains was again notified in 1964, with them being identified as a "Punico-Roman building". Three main features were surveyed, namely a large water cistern, a line of stone water channels, and a foundation wall which was separated from a nearby paved area by a trench. The Roman villa was excavated again between 1972 and 1976, as well as from 2006 onwards. A considerable number of Roman remains are found in the south-eastern part of Malta, such as Tas-Silġ and the Ta' Kaċċatura Roman villa.

During the initial full-scale excavations in 1972, the work focused on the area containing the olive oil pressing remains. Flat floor slabs were also exposed. Archaeologists also found the remains of a number of rectangular rooms paved with lozenge-shaped tiles, in an area identified with residential habitation. The villa was a domestic country settlement with a residential area and an industrial area for olive pressing. The latter is confirmed by large parallel-piped block, with various holes and channels, anchor blocks, and a square block hollowed out to form a circular liquid container. The residential area consisted of at least three rectangular rooms, one of which could be described as a long hall. All the rooms were paved with lozenge-shaped tiles, with coloured tiles forming a herring-bone pattern. These are different from the patterns discovered in the other villas in Malta and Gozo. The walls of the villa were also plastered and decorated with simple line paintings in red, yellow and green, traces of which survived. A hoard of 43 bronze Roman coins dating mostly to the third century AD were recovered during the excavations, as was a small stone oil press. The villa experienced a period of extensive renovation works during the Roman period.

Bronze Age occupation was indicated by two rock-cut silos containing sherds of the Borġ in-Nadur Phase cut in the very soft bedrock. Evidence of activity in Punic times is suggested by finds of early ceramic fragments like the fragment of an imitation kylix and a black gloss sherd, possibly Attic. The most intensive use of the site was in Roman imperial times, as confirmed by the presence of several terra sigillata fragments, both Italian and North African.

The most important find from the 1976 excavation were two fragments of a cooking pot, one bearing an inscription in Punic characters which was read either as a dedication to the god Astarte, or to Anat, or to both. A large number of pottery shards were also discovered, including half a flat red plate and more hand-made pottery. Vine trenches were also found below the Żejtun villa, indicating that the trenches pre-dated the Roman era.

No permanent protection was ever erected to preserve the remains on site, bar a boundary wall which separates the villa from the school and residential roads. Archaeological investigations by the Department of Classics and Archaeology, University of Malta were resumed in 2006. Investigations have been carried out in Germany on artifacts found at Żejtun to establish if there was oil production, but the results have been inconclusive.

Considerable amount of damage occurred to parts of the villa unearthed in the 1970s. The plaster was left out in the open and is flaking and falling off, while the paint is fading. Most of the Roman remains that unearthed in the 1970s are in a very fragile state.

== Bibliography ==
- Annual Report. Malta: Museums Department. 1961. p. 5.
- Annual Report. Malta: Museums Department. 1963. p. 6.
- Annual Report. Malta: Museums Department. 1964. p. 6.
- Annual Report. Malta: Museums Department. 1973–1974. p. 51.
- Bruno, Brunella (2009). Roman and Byzantine Malta: Trade and Economy. Malta: Midsea Books. p. 42. ISBN 978-999327245-8.
- Frendo, A.J. (1999). "A new Punic inscription from Zejtun (Malta) and the goddess Anat-Astarte". Palestine Exploration Quarterly. 131 (1): 24–35. doi:10.1179/peq.1999.131.1.24.
