= Transept =

Architectural element

Cathedral ground plan. The shaded area is the transept; the darker shading at the centre represents the crossing.

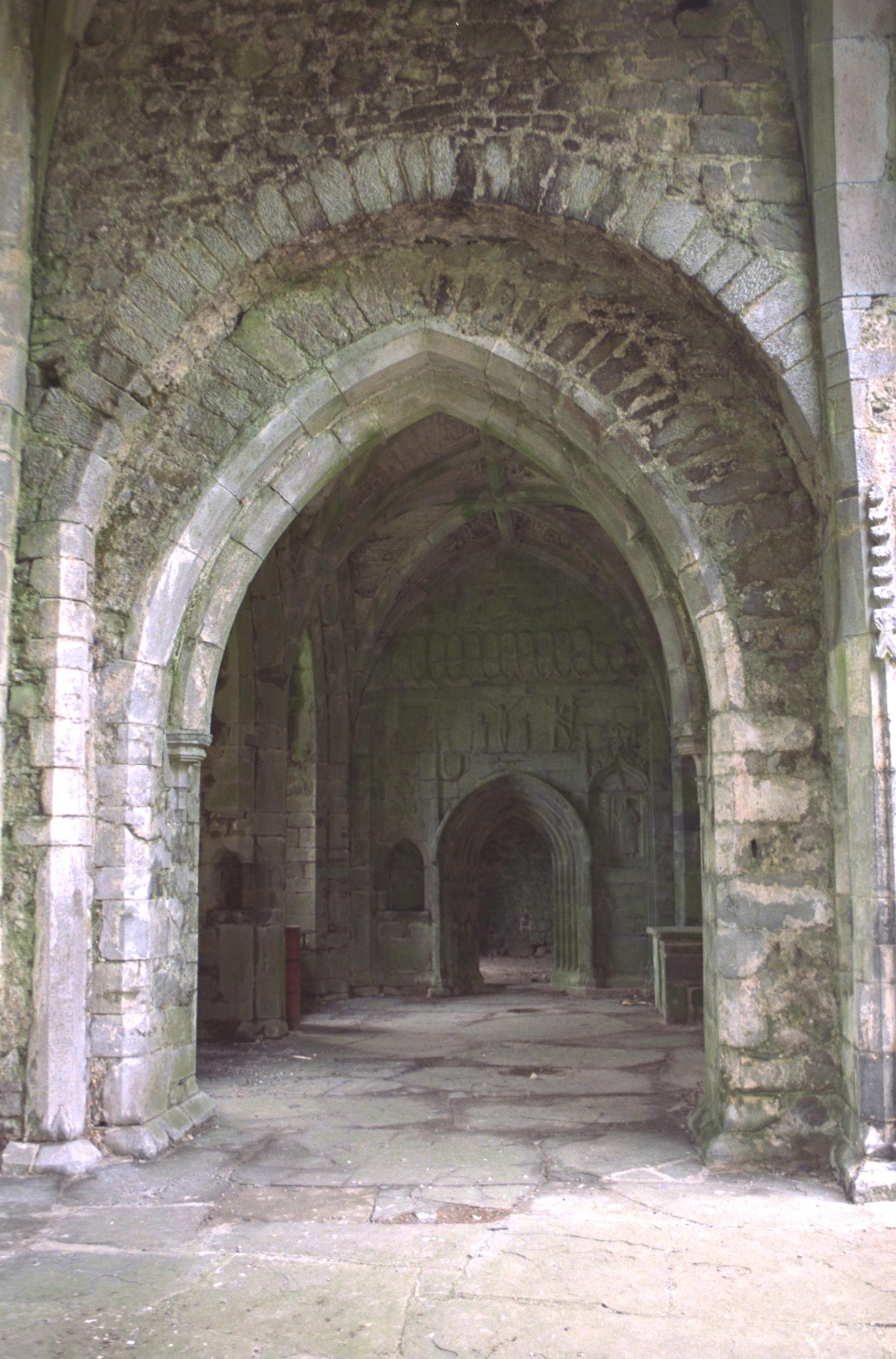
South transept at Kilcooly Abbey, County Tipperary, Ireland

A transept (with two semitransepts) is a transverse part of any building, which lies across the main body of the building. In cruciform ("cross-shaped") churches, particularly within the Romanesque and Gothic traditions of Christian church architecture, a transept is an area set crosswise to the nave. Each half of a transept is known as a semitransept.

== Description ==
The transept of a church separates the nave from the sanctuary, apse, choir, chevet, presbytery, or chancel. The transepts cross the nave at the crossing, which belongs equally to the main nave axis and to the transept. Upon its four piers, the crossing may support a spire (e.g., Salisbury Cathedral), a central tower (e.g., Gloucester Cathedral) or a crossing dome (e.g., St Paul's Cathedral). Since the altar is usually located at the east end of a church, a transept extends to the north and south. The north and south end walls often hold decorated windows of stained glass, such as rose windows, in stone tracery.

Occasionally, the basilicas and the church and cathedral planning that descended from them were built without transepts; sometimes the transepts were reduced to matched chapels. More often, the transepts extended well beyond the sides of the rest of the building, forming the shape of a cross. This design is called a Latin cross ground plan, and these extensions are known as the "arms" of the transept. A Greek cross ground plan, with all four extensions the same length, produces a central-plan structure.

When churches have only one semitransept, as at Pershore Abbey, there is generally a historical disaster, fire, war or funding problem, to explain the anomaly. At Beauvais only the chevet and transepts stand; the nave of the cathedral was never completed after a collapse of the daring high vaulting in 1284. At St. Vitus Cathedral, Prague, only the choir and part of a southern transept were completed until a renewed building campaign in the 19th century.

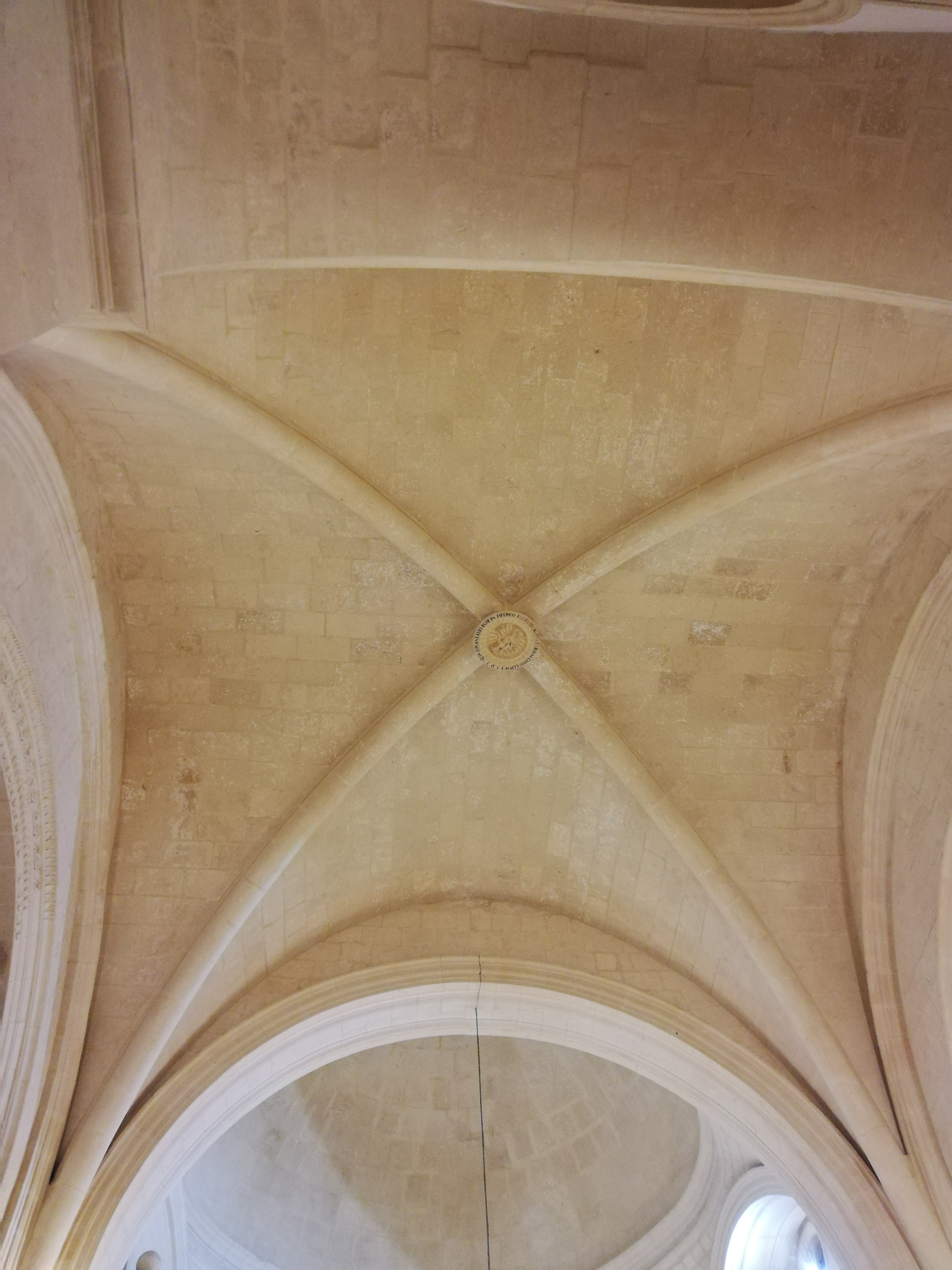
Vault of the northern semitransept of Saint Catherine's Old Church, Żejtun, Malta

== Other senses of the word ==
The word "transept" is occasionally extended to mean any subsidiary corridor crossing a larger main corridor, such as the cross-halls or "transepts" of The Crystal Palace, London, of glass and iron that was built for the Great Exhibition of 1851.

In a metro station or similar construction, a transept is a space over the platforms and tracks of a station with side platforms, containing the bridge between the platforms. Placing the bridge in a transept rather than an enclosed tunnel allows passengers to see the platforms, creating a less cramped feeling and making orientation easier.

== See also ==
- Aisle
- Cathedral architecture
- Cathedral diagram
- Glossary of the Catholic Church
- Transom (architectural)
