= St Angelo's Chapel, Żejtun =

St Angelo's Chapel
- Kappella ta' Sant' Anġlu
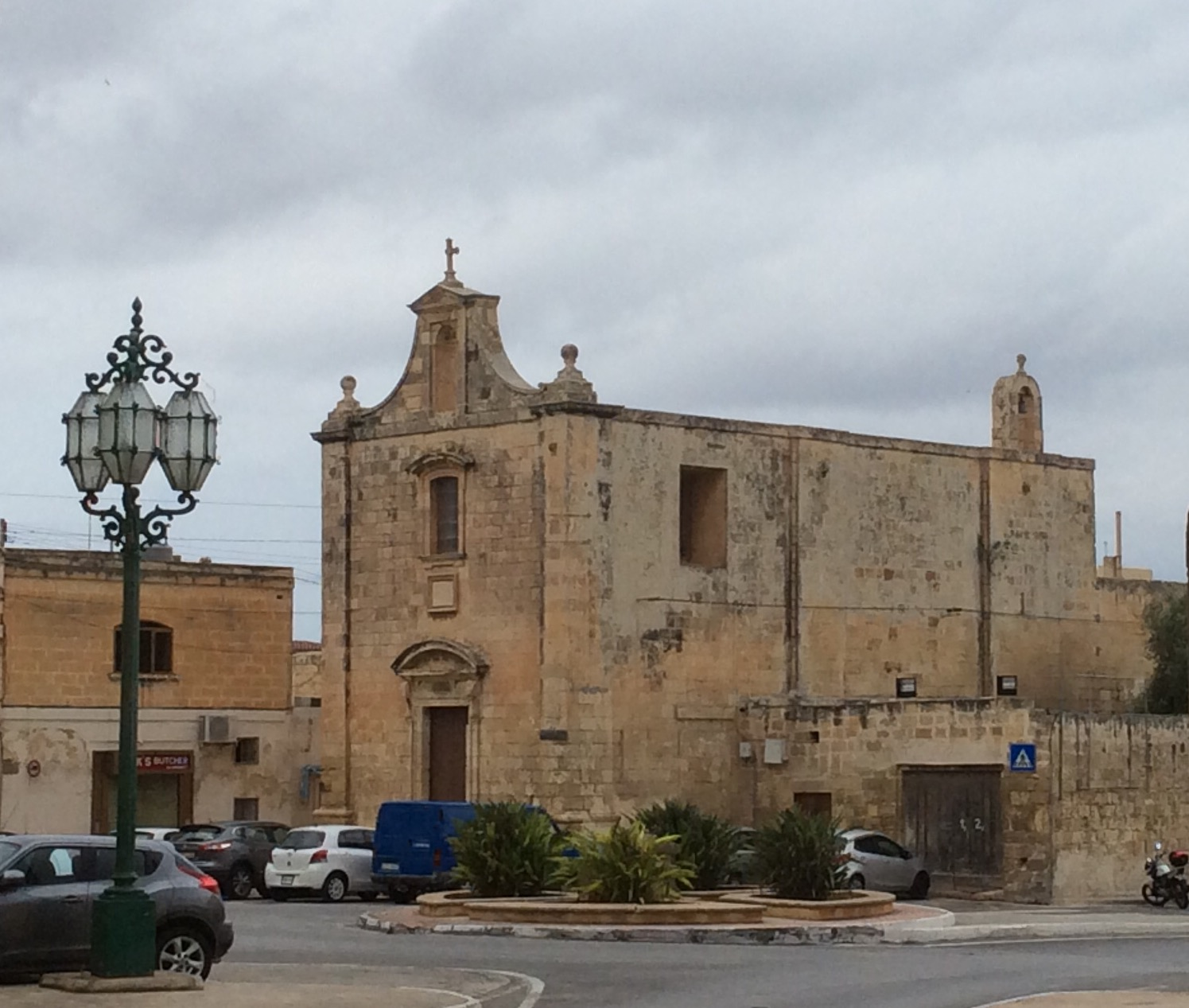

- Location within Malta
- 35°51′13.1″N 14°31′52.7″E
- Location: Żejtun
- Country: Malta
- Denomination: Roman Catholic

History
- Founded: 1670
- Founder: Gregorio Bonnici
- Dedication: Angelus of Jerusalem

Administration
- Archdiocese: Malta

St Angelo's Chapel is a Baroque 17th-century Roman Catholic church in Żejtun, Malta.

== History ==
The chapel was built and founded in 1670 through the initiatives of Gregorio Bonnici, a nobleman who was a main benefactor for the building of the parish church of St Catherine. Plans for the building of the church are attributed to Lorenzo Gafà. On 4 April 1765, the chapel was declared an abbey church and confirmed as such by the Bishop of Malta Lorenzo D'Astiria on 24 April of the same year. The founder, Gregorio Bonnici, decreed that the deeds and ownership of the church be passed on to the first-born of his successors. His nephew Reverend Mario Testaferrata became the first abbot. When the church was built, it had a dome and a Barrel vault however around 1840 one of the side walls started to crumble. Consequently, in 1843, the dome was demolished and the roof and facade restored. Nowadays the church is still owned by the family Testaferrata-Bonnici.

== Interior ==
The chapel includes some notable and priceless works of art by Giuseppe D'Arena. There are 3 altars, one high altar and two side ones. The high altar is decorated with two columns on each side adoring the painting of St Angelo.

There are a number of graves in the church, belonging to members of the Testaferrata-Bonnici family, amongst them the grave of the founder himself, Gregorio Bonnici.

== See also ==
- Ædes Danielis
