= Ædes Danielis =

17th-century building in Żejtun, Malta

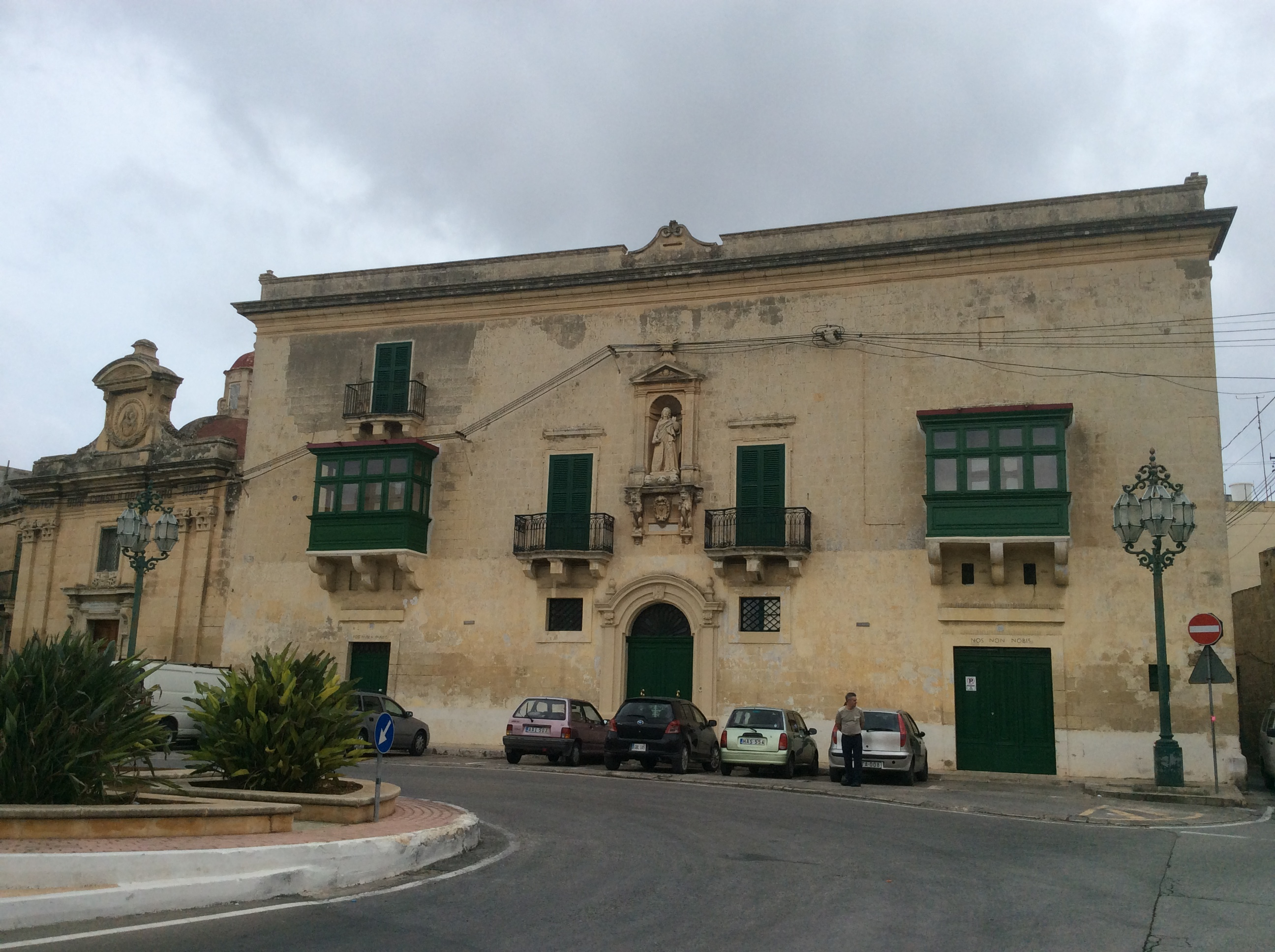
- View of façade with niche of biblical prophet Daniel and the side chapel
- Former names: Gregorio Bonici Palace

General information
- Status: Intact
- Type: Originally a country house, now a primary residence
- Architectural style: Renaissance
- Location: 28-30, Misrah Carlo Diacono, Żejtun, Malta
- Coordinates: 35°51′14″N 14°31′52″E
- Named for: Prophet Daniel; Gregorio Bonici
- Completed: 1660
- Owner: Gregorio Bonici (1612-1697); Mario Testaferrata (1654-1747); Enrico Testaferrata de Noto (1703-?); Giovanni Paolo Testaferrata Olivier (1812-1888); Emmanuele Testaferrata (1843-1903); Daniele Testaferrata (1880-1945); Maria Testaferrata Bonici (1903-1974); Annamaria Spiteri Debono (1961-Present)

Technical details
- Material: Limestone
- Floor count: 3

Ædes Danielis (transl. House of Daniel; Maltese: Dar ta' Danjeli), sometimes known as Palazzo Gregorio Bonici (transl. Gregorio Bonici Palace; Maltese: Palazz Girgor Bonici), is a late 17th-century renaissance building with private gardens and a private church in Żejtun, Malta. It is a historic private property built by Gregorio Bonici as his secondary residence, and is now owned by the descendants of the Bonici and Testaferrata families.

== History ==
Ædes Danielis is a 17th-century country-house, built in 1660 as a residence for the Roman Patrician Don Gregorio Bonici dei Marchesi Bordino (1612–1697). Bonici was one of the donors of the land where the parish church now stands. Bonici was a successful trader in the wheat industry and occupied some of the highest civilian positions in Malta. In fact, he was the castellan (Maltese: Ħakem) of Mdina during the reign of Grandmaster Lascaris.

Gregorio Bonici had offered the land in front of Ædes Danielis to build a larger parish church for the locality but, owing to criticism for being distant from some villagers, it was then decided to alternatively donate other land. The family had no children but, similar to other well-to-do families, owned slaves who took care of the household. Two of the slaves were given their freedom after they convinced their owner of their conversion to Christianity and by marrying them to men he approved. His favourite among the former slaves was Angela who was permitted to take Bonici as her surname. She was given freedom and allowed to get married, living a normal life. She and her husband named their son Daniel, who became a priest thanks to a prerequisite sum of money for priesthood donated by Gregorio.

Following the death of Gregorio Bonici on 16 May 1697, his childless wife (Elena Barbara) inherited his assets, including the building which remained her residence until her death on 28 May 1700. The building later passed to other members of the Bonici family who intermarried with the Testaferrata family, and eventually with the Moroni Viani family.

The garage at the back of the property was used as a massive storage for the decorations of the feast of the village, until around WWII. The building was requisitioned by the British army during WWII to be used by servicemen stationed in the area. The garden, forming part of the property, was directly hit by enemy aerial bombing on 11 May 1941, at around 9pm, just before sunset. The nobility was abolished around 1974.

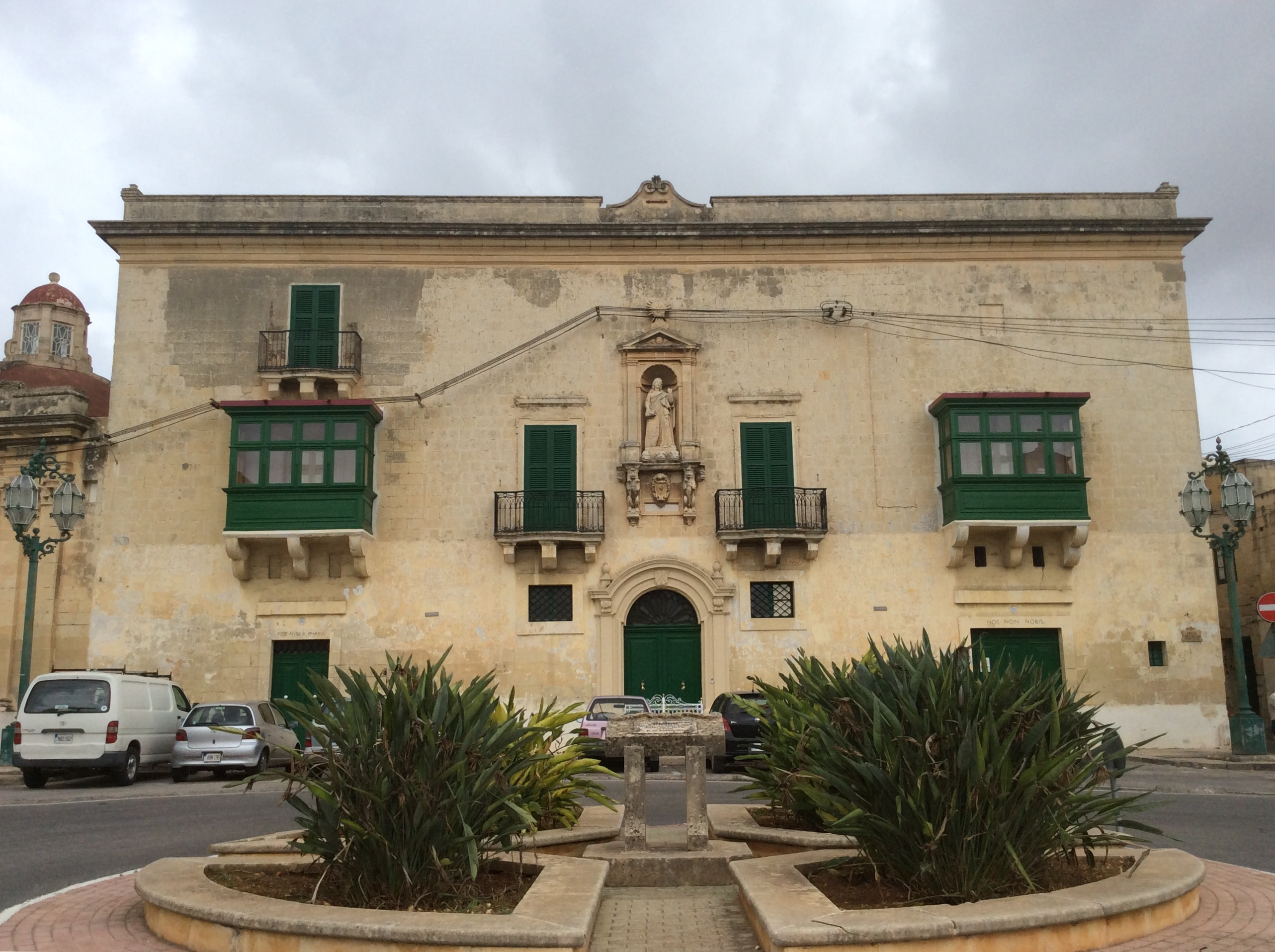
The niche of prophet Daniel is centrally located on the façade.

Undenied word of mouth has it that Bonici's brother, Daniele Bonici, was buried alive after being sexually abused by priests in Birgu. Daniele was 14 years at the time of his death - he served as an altar boy and following the abuse the priests opted for a way to seal their criminal deeds. The building is claimed to be named after him, but it is more likely to have been named for the niche of Prophet Daniel, which is centrally located on the main façade.

The building and its chapel were robbed extensively in two separate occasions - once in January 1980 and again in August 1981. On 14 June 1999, Maria Testaferrata Bonici (née Testaferrata Moroni Viani) died and she left in her will all the belonging to her three children a third each, including the building. The heirs mentioned in the will are Agnes Gera de Petri, Annamaria Spiteri Debono (née Annamaria Testaferrata Bonici), and Caren Preziosi. The building was eventually divided with different family members, but only Annamaria Spiteri Debono holds residence.

The building is mentioned as an official address in the Paradise Papers. The building is also known as Palazzo Aedes Danielis and Aedes Danielis Palace, however the words palazzo or palace are redundant as the Latin word ‘aedes’ means house. It is known by some locals as the il-Palazz tal-Markiża (transl. Palace of the Marquess).

== Architecture ==
The building goes back to the renaissance, originally as a country residence, and is today a landmark welcoming visitors on one of the main streets to the city of Żejtun. The façade is imposing on its surrounding environment. The building, with its ancillary structures and gardens, is a scheduled property as published on the Government Gazette of Malta of July 2009.

A large religious niche, with an imposing life size statue of biblical Prophet Daniel, is a prominent feature on the façade. The statue is one of only two statues in Malta which are representative of an Old Testament personage. The face of the statue is associated to that of Gregorio Bonici as depicted on a painting located at the Parish Church. The niche is adorned with inscriptions, including dates, and other architectural elements, such as lions’ heads and a coat-of-arms. The latter is a listed national monument.

Adjoining the building is a chapel which is dedicated to the Our Lady of Good Counsel. It was built in 1768 to a Baroque design and financed by Enrico Testaferrata. This forms part of the private property and is sometimes opened to the public. The chapel is separately listed as a national monument.

== See also ==
- Church of St Angelo
- Our Lady of Good Counsel Chapel
- Casa Perellos
- Villa Cagliares

== Bibliography ==
=== Books ===
- Abela, Giovanni Francesco; Ciantar, Giovanni Antonio (1772). Malta illustrata ovvero Descrizione di Malta isola del mare siciliano e Adriatico, con le sue antichità, ed altre notizie (in Italian). Vol. III. Giovanni Mallia. pp. 191–194, 487. OCLC 494018534. Archived from the original on 19 October 2023.
- Abela, Joe (1997). Triqat iż-Żejtun: Studju fl-okkażjoni ta' għeluq il-200 sena taż-Żejtun bħala Belt Beland, 1797-1997. Kunsill Lokali taż-Żejtun. pp. 1–102. Archived from the original on 2 October 2025.
- Abela, Joe (2006). The Zejtun Parish through the ages. Midsea Books Ltd. pp. 1–256. ISBN 99932-7-080-6. Archived from the original on 25 March 2023.
- Abela, Joe (2006). Il-Paroċċa Taż-Żejtun Tul Iż-Żminijiet. Klabb Kotba Maltin. pp. 1–256. ISBN 9789993270812. Archived from the original on 3 October 2025.
- Cassar Desain, L.A. (1880). Genealogia della famiglia Testaferrata di Malta (PDF). Vol. 93.19. University of Malta Library, Melitensia Special Collections: Melitensia Miscellanea Collection. pp. 40, 49. Archived from the original (PDF) on 29 October 2025.
- Buhagiar, Mario; Zarb, Serafin M. (1979). St. Catherine of Alexandria: Her Churches, Paintings and Statues in the Maltese Islands. St. Catherine Musical Society. pp. 1–244. ASIN B000HL4Y9A. Archived from the original on 16 August 2025.
- Chircop, Sean; Abela, Joe (2018). Skopri Triqat iż-Żejtun (PDF). Kunsill Lokali taż-Żejtun. ISBN 978-9918-0-0046-3. Archived from the original (PDF) on 2 October 2025.
- Chircop, Sean (2021). Teżori Żwieten nru. 1: Statwi u Niċeċ fi Triqatna. Wirt iz-Zejtun. pp. 27–28, 98–99. ISBN 9789995784072. Archived from the original on 2 October 2025.
- Ciantar, Nikol (2013). Gabra ta' Statwi u Nicec Religjuzi fit-Toroq ta' Malta u Għawdex. Klabb Kotba Maltin. pp. 1–189. ISBN 9789995706029. Archived from the original on 5 October 2025.
- Degiorgio, Stephen; Fiorentino, Emmanuel; Fiorentino, Girolami (2004). Antoine Favray (1706-1798): A French Artist in Rome, Malta and Constantinople. Fondazzjoni Patrimonju Malti. p. 98. ISBN 9789993210269.
- Montalto, John (1979). The Nobles of Malta-1530-1800. Malta: Midsea Books Ltd. pp. 1–389. ASIN B0000EE028. OCLC 9556340. Archived from the original on 10 October 2025.
- Vassallo, Giovanni Antonio (1854). Storia di Malta raccontata in compendio (in Italian). Tip. Francesco Cumbo. p. 740. ISBN 9781293359983. OCLC 79565983. Archived from the original on 15 February 2019.
- Privitelli, Giulia (2013). Teżori Żwieten nru. 2: Il-Knisja Parrokkjali ta' Santa Katerina ta' Lixandra fiż-Żejtun. Wirt iż-Żejtun. ISBN 9789995784096. Archived from the original on 3 October 2025.
- Terribile, Tony (2000). Niċeċ u Statwi fit-Toroq Maltin (in Maltese). Vol. 14 (Kullana Kulturali). Publikazzjoni Indipendenza. ISBN 9789990941784. OCLC 48920678. Archived from the original on 5 October 2025.
- Terribile, Tony (2003). Teżori fil-Knejjes Maltin: Il-Gudja, Marsaxlokk, Iż-Żejtun (in Maltese). Vol. 4. Publikazzjoni Indipendenza. ISBN 9789993241522. OCLC 237836499.
- Vella, Emmanuel Benjamin (1927). Storja taż-Żejtun u Marsaxlokk. Empire Press. ISBN 9789918954919. Archived from the original on 21 September 2025.
- Zammit, Vincent (2024). Iż-Żejtun – Città Beland: Our Heritage, Our Place, Our Life. Wirt iż-Żejtun. ISBN 978-9918-9549-3-3. Archived from the original on 3 August 2025.

=== Chapters in Books ===
- Abela, Joe (1992a). "Girgor Bonici - L-Akbar Benefattur". 300 Sena Ilu: Tifkira tat-tqegħid ta' l-ewwel ġebla tal-Knisja Parrokkjali taż-Żejtun 1692-1992 (in Maltese). Gutenberg Press Malta. pp. 18–30. Archived from the original on 25 December 2024.
- Camilleri, Stephen C. (2015). "The Houses and Dress". Maltese Folklore: Tradition and Heritage (PDF). Book Distributors Limited. pp. 47–98. ISBN 978-99182-12-53-8. Archived from the original (PDF) on 1 August 2025.
- EC, (European Commission) (2015). "Zejtun: Local Intangible Heritage". EDEN (Experiencing Emerging European Destinations) Awards: Malta & Gozo (PDF). European Destinations of Excellence: Winners and Runner-Ups. pp. 40, 41. Archived from the original (PDF) on 14 January 2018.
- Gauci, Charles A. (2002). "Section I: Marquises". The Genealogy and Heraldry of the Noble Families of Malta. Vol. 1. PEG Ltd. pp. 21–70. ISBN 9990903298. Archived from the original on 18 November 2025.
- Guillaumier, Alfie (2005). "Żejtun (Iż-)". Bliet u Rħula Maltin. Vol. 2. klabb kotba maltin. pp. 1010, 1016–1018. ISBN 9789993270553. Archived from the original on 23 October 2025.
- Mahoney, Leonardo (1994). "Architecture". 5000 Years of Architecture in Malta (PDF). Valletta Publication. pp. 125–141. ISBN 9789990958157. Archived from the original (PDF) on 1 August 2025.
- Massue, Melville Henry (1914). "The Mediatized Princely and Noble Houses". The Titled Nobility of Europe: An International Peerage, Or "Who's Who," of the Sovereigns, Princes, and Nobles of Europe. Burke's Peerage. p. 1304. ISBN 9780850110289.
- Said-Zammit, George A. (30 June 2016). "The Maltese Islands: Society, Class, Economy and Settlements". The development of domestic space in the Maltese Islands from the Late Middle Ages to the second half of the Twentieth Century. Archaeopress Publishing Ltd. pp. 37–94. ISBN 9781784913915. Archived from the original on 13 September 2025.
- Spiteri, Mikiel (2000). "The Juspatronati". A Hundred Wayside Chapels of Malta & Gozo. Heritage Books. pp. 176, 177. ISBN 99909-93-06-8. Archived from the original on 3 October 2025.

=== Magazines ===
- Addison, Henry Robert; Oakes, Charles Henry; Lawson, William John; Wheelton Sladen, Douglas Brooke (1922). Who's Who: An annual biographical dictionary, with which is incorporated "Men and women of the time.". Vol. 74. A. & C. Black. p. 2372.
- Addison, Henry Robert; Oakes, Charles Henry; Lawson, William John; Wheelton Sladen, Douglas Brooke (1938). Who's Who: An annual biographical dictionary, with which is incorporated "Men and women of the time.". Vol. 90. A. & C. Black. p. 2980.
- Debrett, John (1921). "Debrett's Peerage, and Titles of Courtesy: In which is Included Full Information Respecting the Collateral Branches of Peers, Privy Councillors, Lords of Session, Etc". Dean. p. 1044.
- Debrett, John (1920). "Debrett's Peerage, Baronetage, Knightage, and Companionage". Kelly's Directories. Vol. Part 1. p. 1030.
- Debrett, John (1925). "Debrett's Illustrated Peerage and Baronetage, Titles of Courtesy and the Knightage". Kelly's Directories. p. 1071.
- Whitaker, Joseph (1913). "Directory of Titled Persons Designed as a Companion to Whitaker's Almanac". J. Whitaker & Sons. p. 678.
- Whitaker, Joseph (1922). "Whitaker's Peerage, Baronetage, Knightage and Companionage for the Year 1922". J. Whitaker & Sons. p. 496. OCLC 3578259.
- Whitaker, Joseph (1923). "Whitaker's Peerage, Baronetage, Knightage and Companionage for the Year 1923". J. Whitaker & Sons. p. 502.
- Whitaker, Joseph (1925). "Whitaker's Peerage, Baronetage, Knightage, and Companionage for the 1925". J. Whitaker & Sons. p. 513. OCLC 5533373.
- Whitaker, Joseph (1929). "Directory of Titled Persons Designed as a Companion to Whitaker's Almanac". J. Whitaker & Sons. p. 526.

=== Journals and Periodicals ===
- Abela, Joe (1992b). "Gaspare Testaferrata in-nobbli Ii ħabb tfajla Żejtunija u Girgor Bonici il-benefattur kbir tal-Knisja" (PDF). Għaqda Banda Żejtun: Festa Santa Katarina V.M.: 1–5. Archived from the original (PDF) on 13 September 2020.
- Abela, Joe (June 1992c). "300 sena mit-tqegħid ta' l-ewwel ġebla tal-Knisja Parrokkjali" (PDF). Iż-Żejtun. Festa Santa Katarina V.M.: 3, 5. Archived from the original (PDF) on 3 July 2024.
- Abela, Joe (November 1992d). "Id-dfin fiż-Żejtun matul iż-Żminijiet" (PDF). Iż-Żejtun (32): 4, 5. Archived from the original (PDF) on 3 October 2025.
- Abela, Joe (2000a). "Girgor Bonici: Bennej tal-Knisja ta' San Gorg f'Birzebbuga (1682)" (PDF). 'Leħen Il-Banda' Tal-Għaqda Mużikali San Pietru Fil-Ktajjen A.D. 1957 (in Maltese). Archived from the original (PDF) on 13 September 2020.
- Abela, Joe (2000b). "Ħakem Girgor Bonici: bennej tal-Knisja ta' San Ġorġ f' Birżebbuġa (1682)" (PDF). Leħen il-Banda: Festa San Pietru fil-Ktajjen. Birżebbuġa: Għaqda Mużikali San Pietru fil-Ktajjen: 85–88. Archived from the original (PDF) on 3 August 2025.
- Abela, Joe (2001). "Dun Danjeli Żammit (1688-1731): Rettur tal-Knisja ta' San Ġorġ". Leħen Il-Banda (in Maltese). Għaqda San Pietru Fil-Ktajjen A.D. 1957. Archived from the original on 11 January 2014.
- Abela, Joe (2008). "Ulied il-Qalb ta' Gesù fiz-Zejtun (1908 - 2008)". Festa Zejtun 2008 (in Maltese): 41–44. Archived from the original on 25 July 2019.
- Abela, Joe (2009b). "Ilsiera ma' familji Zwieten fl-imghoddi" (PDF). Ghaqda Mużikali Beland (in Maltese) (28). Ghaqda Muzikali Beland: 55–59. Archived from the original (PDF) on 11 July 2019.
- Abela, Joe (26 May 2011b). Keith Vella (ed.). "Girgor Bonici". Art by Zejtun PPL. Archived from the original on 5 January 2025.
- Abela, Joe (2012a). "400 Sena mit-twelid ta' Girgor Bonici" (PDF). Festa Zejtun 2012: S. Katerina V.M. (in Maltese): 14–16. Archived from the original (PDF) on 8 July 2019.
- Abela, Ruben (June 2006). "Santa Katarina f'Ittri ta' San Gejtanu Thiene" (PDF). Iż-Żejtun. Harga Specjali Festa: 47–49. Archived from the original (PDF) on 24 September 2025.
- Abela, Ruben (2011). "Il-Magna taż-Żmien" (PDF). Iż-Żejtun. Festa ta' Santa Katarina V.M.: 13–15. Archived from the original (PDF) on 5 September 2025.
- Abela, Ruben (6 May 2011). "Our Lady of Good Counsel Feast". Wirt iż-Żejtun: Appreciation, Protection & Promotion of Our Local Cultural Heritage. Archived from the original on 21 September 2025.
- Abela, Ruben (24 April 2012). "Architecture: Chapel of Our Lady of Good Counsel". Wirt iż-Żejtun: Appreciation, Protection & Promotion of Our Local Cultural Heritage. Archived from the original on 21 September 2025.
- Abela, Ruben (4 February 2021). "Important buildings at Zejtun proposed for scheduling" (PDF). Wirt iż-Żejtun. pp. 1–59. Archived from the original (PDF) on 5 April 2025.
- Abela, Joe (June 2011a). "Dun Karm Vella (1855 - 1910)" (PDF). Festa Santa Katerina V.M. (in Maltese): 71. Archived from the original (PDF) on 8 July 2019.
- Baldacchino, Carmelo P. (June 2001). "Vittmi Zwieten matul il-Gwerra li ghaddiet" (PDF). Festa Santa Katerina V.M. (in Maltese). Ghaqda Banda Zejtun. Archived from the original (PDF) on 8 July 2019.
- Baldacchino, Carmelo P. (June 2008). "L-Armar tal-Festa fl-imghoddi" (PDF). Festa Santa Katerina V.M. (in Maltese): 65–71. Archived from the original (PDF) on 15 July 2019.
- Baldacchino, Carmelo P. (2012). "Kurzitajiet" (PDF). Festa Santa Katarina V.M. (in Maltese). Ghaqda Banda Zejtun: 106–110. Archived from the original (PDF) on 22 September 2025.
- Baldacchino, Joe (June 2009). "It-Tracedja tal-Pjazza taz-Zejtun" (PDF). Ghaqda Banda Zejtun A.D. 1933 (in Maltese). pp. 1, 2. Archived from the original (PDF) on 25 July 2019.
- Bonnici, Carmel (July–September 2020). "Sant' Anġlu ta' Sqallija - Karmelitan: Il-knisja ta' Sant' Anġlu fiż-Żejtun". Il-Karmelu: Lehen Il-Karmelitani Maltin (in Maltese). 85 (3). PrintIt Printing Services: 4, 5. Archived from the original on 22 September 2025.
- Borg, Vincent (1975). "Our Lady of Good Counsel". Melita Historica. Malta Historical Society: 163–169. ISSN 1021-6952. Archived from the original on 22 August 2019.
- Buhagiar, Mario (June 2005). "Niċeċ fiż-Żejtun iddedikati lil Santa Katerina" (PDF). Għaqda Banda Żejtun. Żejtun: Festa Ċentinarja Santa Katarina: 60. Archived from the original (PDF) on 12 August 2025.
- Debattista, Rachel (2022). "Mixja mal-postijiet ta' qima fiz-Zejtun" (PDF). Soċjetà Mużikali Beland (37): 147–151. Archived from the original (PDF) on 6 August 2025.
- Debono, C. J. (March 1970). "Girgor Bonicci" (PDF). Il-Belt Beland: Leħen il-Parroċċa taż-Żejtun (2). Għaqda għall-Istorja: 12.
- Duca, Carmen (2013). "Il-bandalora tal-1949 u xogħol tar-rakkmu mis-sorijiet tal-lstitut ta' Ġesu Nazzarenu fiż-Żejtun" (PDF). Għaqda Mużikali San Leonardu: Festa San Leonardu. Kirkop: 267–272. Archived from the original (PDF) on 3 August 2025.
- Falzon, Anton (23 August 2021). "Minuti: Laqgħa tal-Kunsill Lokali taż-Żejtun" (PDF). Żejtun Local Council (7/21). Sala Mikiel Cachia, 'Dar iż-Żwieten', Kunsill Lokali, 28 Triq Sant' Anġlu, Żejtun: 1–7. Archived from the original (PDF) on 3 August 2025.
- Farrugia, Jonathan (2006). "Filippo Fortunato Venuti u l-Kwadru Titulari ta' l-Assunta fl-Imqabba" (PDF). Festa Santa Marija. Mqabba: 91. Archived from the original (PDF) on 4 July 2016.
- Farrugia, Connie (2007). "Rahal Twelidi" (PDF). Santa Katerina V.M. (in Maltese). Festa Zejtun 2007: 42–44. Archived from the original (PDF) on 25 July 2019.
- Ganado, Albert (22 November 2020). "An unknown prestigious house in Valletta – part 2" (PDF). The Sunday Times of Malta: 40, 41. Archived from the original (PDF) on 2 August 2025.
- Grima, Joseph F. (2012). "Kappelli ta' San Ġorġ fil-gżejjer Maltin fis-sena 1575" (PDF). Festa San Ġorġ (in Maltese). Qormi: Għaqda tan-Nar 23 ta' April: 73, 75, 77. Archived from the original (PDF) on 4 September 2025.
- Sciberras, Tony (2007). "Ġużeppina Curmi - Gesù Nazzarenu - Ġużeppi De Piro" (PDF). Santa Katerina V.M. pp. 67, 68. Archived from the original (PDF) on 17 November 2025.
- Scicluna, Frank L. (June 2023). "Zejtun" (PDF). Journal for Maltese Living Abroad (478): 8, 9. Archived from the original (PDF) on 4 September 2025.
- Terribile, Tony (June 1998). "Santa Katarina fit-toroq taż-Żejtun" (PDF). Iż-Żejtun: Festa ta' Santa Katarina V.M.: 16, 29. Archived from the original (PDF) on 12 August 2025.
- Terribile, Tony (1999). "Il-Knisja ta' Sant Anġlu" (PDF). Wirt iz-Zejtun: Festa ta' Santa Katarina V.M.]: 39. Archived from the original (PDF) on 3 August 2025.
- Xuereb, Philip (2013). "F'gheluq il-250 sena tal-kwadru titulari ta' Santa Elena: Kwadri u Xbihat impittra ta' Santa Elena fi Knejjes u Muzewijiet f'Malta" (PDF). Ghaqda Muizikali Sant'Elena - Birkirkara A.D. 1919: 81, 83, 85, 87, 88. Archived from the original (PDF) on 29 September 2025.
- Zahra, Frans (June 1998). "Soċjetajiet reliġjuzi fiż-Żejtun" (PDF). Għaqda Banda Żejtun - Festa Santa Katarina V.M.: 53, 55, 57, 59, 61. Archived from the original (PDF) on 22 September 2025.
- Zahra, Lorenzo (2010). "Fratellanzi tal-Madonna taċ-Ċintura" (PDF). Festa Madonna taċ-Ċintura. Gudja: Għaqda Mużikali Marija Assunta: 97. Archived from the original (PDF) on 16 October 2025.
- Zammit, Emmanuel (2014). "Teżori żgħar bi storja kbira" (PDF). Għaqda Banda Żejtun - Festa Santa Katarina V.M.: 64, 65. Archived from the original (PDF) on 9 August 2025.
- Zammit, Manuel (16 June 2019). "130 Sena-Bazilka" (PDF). Festa Sta. Katarina V.M. Zejtun (in Maltese): 104, 105. Archived from the original (PDF) on 6 August 2025.
- Zammit, Massabielle (2016). Christopher Chetcuti (ed.). "Nicec fit-Toroq Taghna". Festa Sta. Katerina V.M. (in Maltese) (32 ed.). Ghaqda Banda Zejtun: 70, 71. Archived from the original on 20 October 2022.
- Zammit, Paul (June 2014). "San Ġużepp Benedittu Labre: qaddis Franċiż li żar iż-Żejtun" (PDF). L-Armar. Għaqda ta’ l-Armar 25 ta’ Novembru - Festa Santa Katarina V.M.: 60–61. Archived from the original (PDF) on 9 August 2025.
- Zammit, Paul (2018). "Ir-restawr tal-kwadru tal-Madonna taċ-Ċintura taż-Żejtun" (PDF). Festa Madonna Taċ-Ċintura, Gudja (in Maltese): 84–85. Archived from the original (PDF) on 13 September 2020.

=== Gazettes ===
- Government of Malta (July 2009). "Legal Notices" (PDF). Government Gazette. Archived (PDF) from the original on 15 July 2019. "...as Aedes Danielis, Żejtun, including the gardens and the. Chapel tal-Bon Kunsil and..."
- "National Inventory of the Cultural Property of the Maltese Islands" (PDF). The Malta Government Gazette. 21, 248 (G.N.640): 13,038. 24 May 2024. Archived from the original (PDF) on 1 August 2025.
- "List of Decision Notifications for Development Permission Applications" (PDF). The Malta Government Gazette (20, 964). Planning Authority: 15,910. 23 November 2022. Archived from the original (PDF) on 6 August 2025. "ŻEJTUN PA/05120/21 REF: To join properties approved in PA7221/20 and DN755/20, minor internal alterations and addition of 1st floor level using same architectural grammar. Raising of adjacent garden wall. Ms Anna Maria Spiteri Debono, 178, Triq Santa Marija c/w 5, Triq Luqa Briffa c/w, Misrah Karlu Diacono, Zejtun"
- "Planning/Regularisation Applications" (PDF). The Malta Government Gazette (21, 365). Planning Authority: 30,044. 24 December 2024. Archived from the original (PDF) on 26 September 2025. "ŻEJTUN PA/04980/24 03/02/2025 Full: To sanction demolition of wall to facili[tate] installation of gate. Anna Maria Spiteri Debono, 14, Triq Licata, Zejtun. Riferut mill-proċess Sommarju għal dak Sħiħ / Referred from Summary to Full Process"
- "List of Decision Notifications for Development Permission Applications" (PDF). The Malta Government Gazette (21, 449). Planning Authority: 7465. 4 June 2025. Archived from the original (PDF) on 26 September 2025. "ŻEJTUN PA/04980/24 GTD: To reconstruct breach in wall on Triq Licata leaving an access door to said street. Proposed opening of access gate on Misrah Karlu Diacono an creation of parking area for private cars in existing unbuilt site. Anna Maria Spiteri Debono, 14, Triq Licata, Zejtun"

=== News ===
- Carabott, Sarah (10 August 2018). "Żejtun treasure hunt being held on Friday: Third edition is great way to find out about town's history". Times of Malta. Archived from the original on 9 July 2019.
- Cooke, Patrick (12 February 2014). "Collector's rights 'not breached'". Times of Malta. Archived from the original on 14 August 2025.
- Gauci, Charles (11 February 2019). "Malta's aristocracy: The peerage in Malta consists of the Maltese nobility together with the holders of bona fide foreign titles". Times of Malta. Archived from the original on 10 July 2019.
- Ganado, Albert (22 November 2020). "An unknown prestigious house in Valletta – part 2". Times of Malta. Archived from the original on 2 August 2025.
- Grima, Noel (14 April 2024). "All about Zejtun". The Malta Independent. Archived from the original on 3 August 2025.
- Grima, Noel (5 May 2019). "Murder most foul – hypothesis over boy's rape hundreds of years ago". The Malta Independent. Archived from the original on 9 July 2019.
- Grima, Noel (15 June 2025). "Streets in celebration". The Malta Independent. Archived from the original on 3 August 2025.
- ICIJ (2016). "Aedes Danielis, Triq il-Madonna ta' l-Bon Kunsill, Zejtun". Offshore Leaks Database. Archived from the original on 7 July 2019.
- "Exploring one of Malta's oldest cities". Times of Malta. 16 November 2019. Archived from the original on 4 September 2025.
- Schiavone, Micheal (16 October 2023). "Biography: Maria Giuseppina Curmi". Archived from the original on 24 September 2025.

=== Court and Tribunal cases ===
- Aguis, Carmel A. (Judge) (30 October 2001). "Il-Pulizija (Sup. Daniel Gatt) vs Francis Vella". Criminal Court of Appeal (in Maltese). Numru 5 (Appell Nru. 264/92): 1–20. Archived from the original on 9 July 2019.
- Azzopardi, Joseph (Judge) (12 April 2019). "Caren mart Dr Josef Preziosi, Annamaria mart John Spiteri Debono vs Agnes Gera de Petri Testaferrata Bonici Ghaxaq". Civil Court of First Instance (in Maltese). Kawza Nru: 26 (591/13 JA): 1–41. Archived from the original on 20 January 2022.
- Elens-Passos, Françoise (11 February 2014). "Case of Vella v. Malta". European Court of Human Rights. Fourth Section (Application no. 69122/10): 6–8. Archived from the original on 14 August 2025.
- Kummissarju tal-Artijiet vs Eredi ta’ Baruni Testaferrata Bonici, Avviz Numru. 148/2013 Sentenza Finali (Qrati tal-Gustizzja 23 June 2014).
- Fenech, F. (1886). "Emmanuele Testaferrata Bonici Asciack versus Lorenzo Antonio Testaferrata ed altri". Kollezzjoni ta' deċiżjonijiet tal- qrati superjuri ta' Malta. Vol. X. Stamperija tal-Gvern. pp. 212–218.
- Marshall, of the Court (28 August 2018). "Court Notices". Malta Government Gazette (20, 046): 1330–1359. Archived from the original on 20 October 2022.
- McKeon, Joseph Zammit (Judge) (31 January 2017). "Agnes Gera de Petri Testaferrata Bonici Ghaxaq (nru tal-Identita' 454749 M) kontra Annamaria Spiteri Debono (ID 380861M) sew personali kif ukoll fil-kwalita' taghha ta' prokuratrici ta' Caren Preziosi (ID340952M) u f'din l-ahhar kwalita' ghall-interess li jista' jkollha l- imsemmija Caren Preziosi". Civil Court of First Instance (in Maltese). Kawza Nru. 3 (Rik. Gur. Nru. 797/08 JZM): 1–53. Archived from the original on 8 July 2019.
- Scicluna, David (Judge) (22 June 2001). "Baronessa Maria Testaferrata Bonici, armla, Beatrici Testaferrata Moroni Viani, xebba, il-Markiza Agnese Gera De Petri Testaferrata Bonici Ghaxaq mart Alfred Gera De Petri u l-istess Alfred Gera De Petri bhala amministratur tal- beni parafernali tal-istess martu, Anna Maria Spiteri Debono sew proprio kif ukoll bhala prokuratrici tal-Kontessina Karen Preziosi u John Spiteri Debono bhala amministratur tal-beni parafernali ta' martu vs Francis Vella". Court of First Instance (in Maltese). Numru 44 (Citaz. numru 991/92 DS): 1–15. Archived from the original on 9 July 2019.
- Spiteri Debono, Annamaria (8 March 2017). "PA/02603/15". Environment and Planning Review Tribunal. pp. 1–3. Archived from the original on 8 July 2019.
- Pulicino, Filippo (1884). Memorie sul Marchesato di San Vincenzo Ferreri: estratte dai due processi già vertenti tra i Nobili Emmanuele Testaferrata Bonnici Asciack e Lorenzo Antonio Testaferrata e decisi in favore del primo dalla Corte d'Appello di S. M. il 5 Novembre 1884 (PDF). Vol. 52.8. Melitensia Special Collection. pp. 7–11. Archived from the original (PDF) on 6 August 2025.
- Sammut, Joseph (17 October 1978). "Court Notice: Common Jurors" (PDF). The Malta Government Gazette (in Maltese). 13550 (586). Registry of the Superior Courts, Valletta: 3197. Archived from the original (PDF) on 22 September 2025.

=== Online ===
- Abela, Joe (2013). "Development of Zejtun Hamlets". Zejtun: Religious Heritage Trail. Archived from the original on 8 July 2019.
- Abela, Ruben (2013b). "Niċeċ u Statwi: Danjeli fuq id-Dar ta' Danjeli". Wirt iż-Żejtun: Napprezzaw, Nipproteġu u Nippromwovu il-Wirt Kulturali Tagħna (in Maltese). Archived from the original on 27 November 2024.
- Abela, Ruben (13 May 2012b). "Street Shrines: The Statue of Daniel on Daniel's House". Wirt iż-Żejtun: Appreciation, Protection & Promotion of Our Local Cultural Heritage. Archived from the original on 7 July 2019.
- Abela, Ruben (4 April 2011c). "Il-Kappelli: Il-Kappella tal-Madonna tal-Bon Kunsill". Wirt iż-Żejtun: Appreciation, Protection & Promotion of Our Local Cultural Heritage (in Maltese). Archived from the original on 8 July 2019.
- Abela, Ruben (2019). "Aedis Danielis". PlakkaStorja. Archived from the original on 8 July 2019.
- Abela, Ruben (30 October 2013a). "Beltna: Il-Palazz Aedis Danielis". Napprezzaw, Nipproteġu u Nippromwovu il-Wirt Kulturali Tagħna (in Maltese). Archived from the original on 8 July 2019.
- Bilocca, Niki (2025). "Zejtun, Malta: Towns and Villages". My Guide. Archived from the original on 30 September 2025.
- Cascelli, Flora (24 September 2016). "Experience Zejtun during the Olive Oil Festival". Exploring Malta: Experiencing the South Villages. Archived from the original on 8 July 2019.
- Chircop, Glenn (2015). "Il-Palazz Aedes Danielis". Il-Kunsill Lokali taż-Żejtun (in Maltese). Archived from the original on 7 July 2019.
- Chircop, Glenn (2019). "Żejtun Local Council: Aedes Danielis Palace". Żejtun Local Council. Archived from the original on 7 July 2019.
- Local Government (2018). "Places of Interest". Government of Malta. Archived from the original on 9 July 2019.
- Stranges, Paola (27 December 2017). "Zejtun la città maltese che coltiva olio". Italiani a Malta (in Italian). Archived from the original on 7 July 2019.
- Sciberras, Tony (2001). "IL-Qaddej ta' Alla Ġuzeppi De Piro 1877-1933". ShortBibiography1.
- Zahra, Frans (2 December 2013). "Feasts and Traditions". Zejtun: Religious Heritage Trail. Archived from the original on 17 April 2019.

=== Reports ===
- Falcon, Maltese (February 2011). St. Catherine Parish Church, Zejtun: Restoration Method Statement (PDF). Maltese Falcon (Report). pp. 1–20. Archived from the original (PDF) on 11 July 2019.
- Farrugia, Kurt (February 2025). Annual Report 2024 (PDF). Superintendence of Cultural Heritage (Report). p. 33. Archived from the original (PDF) on 4 August 2025.
- NICPMI (27 December 2013a). "Niche of Prophet Daniel" (PDF). National Inventory of the Cultural Property of the Maltese Islands (1912): 1, 2. Archived from the original (PDF) on 10 July 2019.
- NICPMI (27 December 2013b). "Chapel of Mater Boni Consilii" (PDF). National Inventory of the Cultural Property of the Maltese Islands (1914): 1, 2. Archived from the original (PDF) on 10 July 2019.
- Scerri, Eleanor (6 May 2025). Dokument imqiegħed fuq il-Mejda tal-Kamra tad-Deputati fis-Seduta Numru 338 tas-6 ta' Mejju 2025 mill-Ministru għall-Wirt Nazzjonali, l-Arti u l-Gvern Lokali (PDF) (Report). Parliament of Malta. p. 33. Archived from the original (PDF) on 22 September 2025.

=== Other ===
- Abela, José (9 April 2013c). "¡Malta, por fin…!". joseabelam (in Spanish). Archived from the original on 27 November 2024.
- Abela, Ruben (29 April 2019b). "Wirt Iż-Żejtun's Post". Wirt Iz-Zejtun. Facebook. Archived from the original on 14 November 2025.
- Borg, Jean Paul (21 June 2020). "Zejtun, Malta". Kappa Vision.
- Borg, Jean Paul (13 October 2024). "Zejtun - Album 3". Kappa Vision.
- Borg, Victor Paul (21 September 2007). "The facade of Aedes Daniels Palace in Zejtun, Malta". Alamy (ID: B6HCN0). Archived from the original on 8 July 2019.
- Editorial Team (2 November 2026). "Palazzo Bonici in Żejtun shares its family story in stone and devotion". Visit Malta Now. Archived from the original on 12 November 2026.
- Nina; Sandra (2014). "Towns & Villages: Zejtun". Maltassist. Archived from the original on 7 November 2022.
- Scerri, John (April 2019). "Zejtun: Churches and Chapels of Malta and Gozo of all times". Malta-Canada. Archived from the original on 26 February 2010.
- Tepfenhart, Rudolf (11 November 2014). "Gregorio Bonnici's palace, Malta". Rudolf-Tepfenhart. p. 307. Archived from the original on 8 July 2019.
- Terribile, Tony (1970). "Knisja Filjali Il-Madonna tal-Bon Kunsill". The National Archives of Malta. Archived from the original on 13 November 2025.
- Terribile, Tony (1970). "Knisja Filjali Sant'Anglu". National Archives of Malta. Archived from the original on 13 November 2025.
- "Inventory Number: 02564". Superintendence of Cultural Heritage. 24 May 2024. p. 1. Archived from the original on 1 August 2025.
- "Thirty-seven (37) additions to the National Inventory". Superintendence of Cultural Heritage. 27 May 2024. Archived from the original on 1 August 2025.
- Caruana, Angelo; Chircop, Glen (2018). "Daħla". ŻOEY (Żejtun Organisation to Empower You). Iż-Żejtun 5.37 Kwiżż: Triqat, Xbihat, u Ulied iż-Żejtun. pp. Z15, P9, P6. Archived from the original on 2 October 2025.
- Cocker, Mario (17 June 2021). "Santa Katarina, mera ta' paċenzja". Facebook. Għaqda tal-Armar 25 ta' Novembru.

=== Documents ===
- Lanfranco, Michael (28 November 2022). "Application Number: PA/5120/21". Environment and Planning Review Tribunal. Architect + Civil Engineer: 1–3. "Location: 178, Triq Santa Marija c/w 5, Triq Luqa Briffa c/w, Misrah Karlu Diacono, Zejtun. Proposal: To join properties approved in PA7221/20 and DN755/20, minor internal alterations and addition of 1st floor level using same architectural grammar. Raising of adjacent garden wall. We refer to the decision issued by the Planning Authority which refused the application in caption for the following reason: 1. The proposed extension to the existing garden boundary wall and the additional volume above the onestorey built structures within the same garden compromises the historic and cultural heritage value of the Palazzo Ædes Danielis and its gardens and the openness and character of the Open Space Enclave as well as that of the immediate context, which comprises of narrow streets. The proposal, which is also being objected to by the Superintendence of Cultural Heritage, visually impinges on the immediate context, compromises the architectural grammar and original design of the 17th century historical palazzo and the historic and cultural heritage value of the existing Palazzo and therefore runs counter to the Urban Objective 3 of the Strategic Plan for Environment and Development which aims to protect and enhance the character and amenity of urban areas."
- NAM (18 February 1971). "Transfer of land known as 'Tal-Fgura' bounded on west by St. Angelo Street, on east and south by Mater Boni Consilii Street, Zejtun. Baron L.Testaferrata Bonici". National Archives of Malta. Office of the Prime Minsiter. Archived from the original on 6 October 2025.
- EPRT (20 July 2023). "EPRT Agenda - Inspections - 20/07/2023". Environment and Planning Review Tribunal. pp. 1, 2. "Appeal Ref: PAB/00338/22, Re Ref: PA/05120/21, Appellant: Ms Anna Maria Spiteri Debono, Location: Zejtun, Time: 10.15am"
- EPRT (7 December 2023). "EPRT Agenda - Decisions - 07/12/2023". Environment and Planning Review Tribunal. p. 1. "Appeal Ref: PAB/00338/22, Re Ref: PA/05120/21, Appellant: Ms Anna Maria Spiteri Debono, Locatiom: Zejtun, Time: 1.15pm"

=== Theses ===
- Demicoli, Yvette (June 1998). "Zejtun". Zejtun: A Social and Economic Study (Thesis). University of Malta. pp. 1–36. Archived from the original on 25 September 2025.
- Fenech, Joel (June 2007). "The development of Zejtun". Effect of folklore, customs, and traditions on urban morphology: a case study of Żejtun (Thesis). University of Malta. pp. 57–78. Archived from the original on 25 September 2025.
- Privitelli, Giulia (June 2013). "The Genesis of the New Parish Church of St. Catherine in Żejtun". The Parish Church of St. Catherine of Alexandria in Zejtun: An Architectural Appraisal (Thesis). University of Malta. pp. 42–77. Archived from the original on 26 September 2025. See also.
- Privitera, William (June 2005). "Identification of Cultural Resources". Tourism Planning for Historical Cores in the South of Malta: A Case Study of Zejtun (Thesis). University of Malta. pp. 60–80. Archived from the original on 25 September 2025.
- Sammut, Warren (September 2013). "Żejtun". Identifying and Developing a Core Village into a Tourist Destination: The Case of Żejtun (Thesis). University of Malta. pp. 47–77. Archived from the original on 26 September 2025.

=== Videos ===
- Abela, Ruben (5 February 2021). Ritratt Storja: 4. YouTube (in Maltese). Zoom (Online): Wirt iż-Żejtun. Archived from the original (Series of Lectures) on 5 October 2025.
- Chircop, Sean (2 April 2020). "Aedes Danielis". Tikka dwar Madwarna. Episode 6 (in Maltese). Wirt iż-Żejtun. 346 minutes in. Archived from the original on 14 September 2020.
- Chircop, Sean (13 May 2021). Statwi u Nicec fi Triqatna: Nru 1. YouTube (in Maltese). Zoom (Online): Wirt iż-Żejtun. Archived from the original (Series of Lectures) on 5 October 2025.
- Chircop, Sean (3 June 2021). Statwi u Nicec fi Triqatna: Nru 4. YouTube (in Maltese). Zoom (Online): Wirt iż-Żejtun. Archived from the original (Series of Lectures) on 5 October 2025.
