= St Catherine's Old Church, Żejtun =

St Catherine's Old Church
- St Catherine's Old Church
- St Gregory's Church
- Knisja ta' Santa Katerina l-Antika (Maltese)
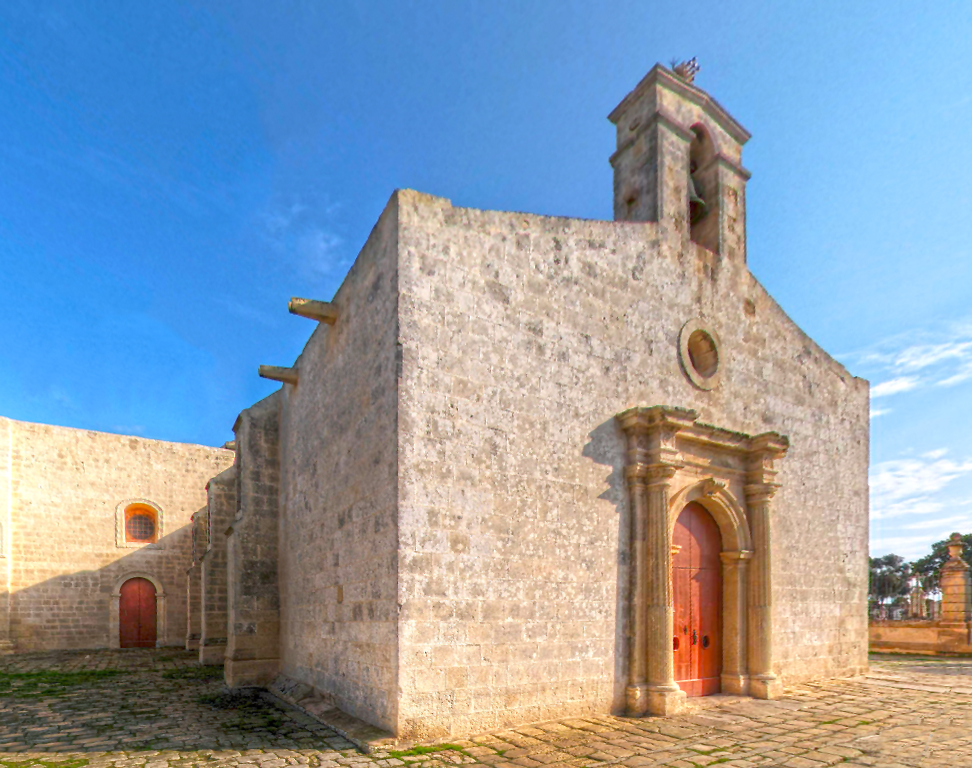
- Façade of St Catherine's Old Church

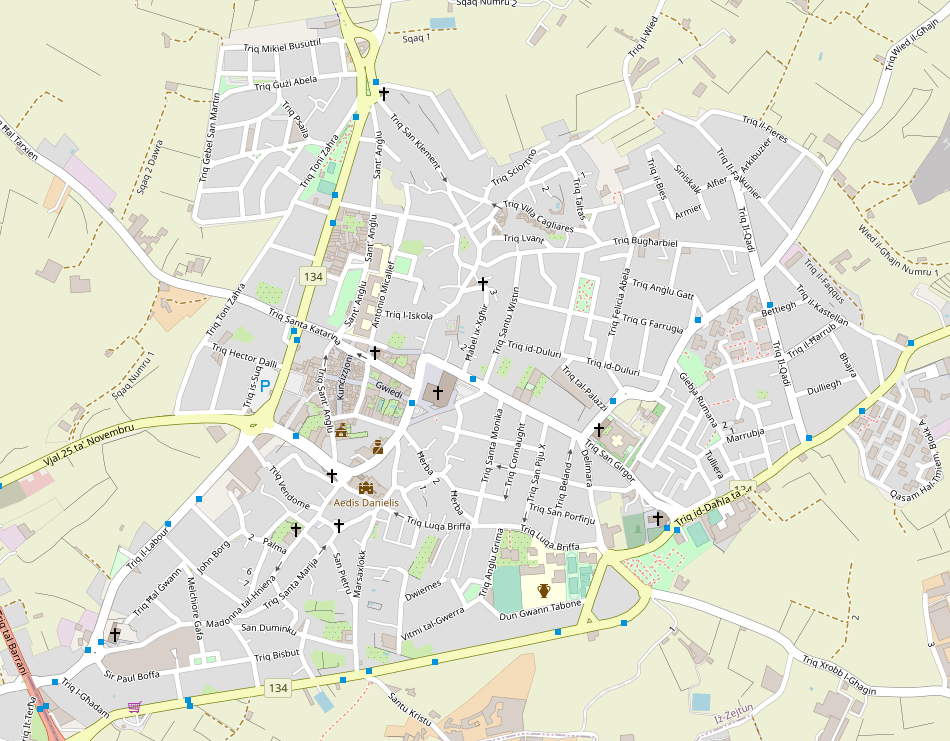
- Location on a map of Malta St Catherine's Old Church (Malta)
- 35°51′10.6″N 14°32′17.7″E
- Location: Żejtun
- Country: Malta
- Denomination: Roman Catholic
- Tradition: Latin Rite

History
- Dedication: Saint Catherine of Alexandria
- Other dedication: Pope St. Gregory

Architecture
- Heritage designation: Grade 1 Listed building
- Style: Renaissance, Gothic and Baroque
- Groundbreaking: Unknown (current edifice dates from 15th century)
- Completed: 1606

Specifications
- Length: 130 feet (40 m)
- Width: 105 feet (32 m)
- Materials: Limestone

Administration
- Diocese: Malta

St Catherine's Old Church (Maltese: Knisja ta' Santa Katerina l-Antika), also known as St Gregory's Church (Maltese: Knisja ta' San Girgor), is a Roman Catholic church in Żejtun. The church and its complex sit towards the outskirts of the town, commanding views over Marsascala Bay, St Thomas' Bay and Marsaxlokk harbour. The church is colloquially known as Saint Gregory's due to a traditional procession held on the first Wednesday following Easter Sunday. Its dedication to Catherine of Alexandria dates back to an original chapel on this site, which was one of the eight mother churches on Malta. The church stands next to the three cemeteries of Żejtun, dedicated to St Rocco, St Gregory and St Catherine. The church's functions as the parish church of Żejtun were taken over by a new parish church, also dedicated to St Catherine, and designed by Lorenzo Gafà.

The present day church was built on the site of an older 15th century chapel, also dedicated to St Catherine, along with an adjacent private chapel dedicated to St Mark and St Jacob. Late medieval texts prove that the church became a landmark for seafarers. Over the years, the chapel was restructured and enlarged, with the demolition of the adjacent private chapel. The extensions included the construction of a transept and a dome. The present day façade was probably altered in the 17th century, with the addition of a Renaissance doorway. St Catherine's Old Church is a working church with prayer and daily mass services. The church is a Grade 1 scheduled building and is listed on the National Inventory of the Cultural Property of the Maltese Islands.

== Topography ==
The church sits at the end of a saddle-backed ridge, running between Marsaxlokk, and St Thomas' Bay and Marsascala. The other end of the ridge lies at the end of Delimara peninsula. The existing road network in area appears to have been largely formed by the early modern period. However, parts of it may be much older. The positioning of St Catherine's Old Church appears to have been tied with the districts served by the parish. The church stands within 250 metres (820 ft) from the remains of a Roman villa.

By walking across some fields due south of this villa, the existing road descends through Ras il-Wied to Marsaxlokk Bay, with the route representing the most efficient path from Żejtun down to the bay. The present-day road runs from St Catherine's old church along the spine of the ridge, towards Xrobb l-Għaġin, before climbing the knoll of Tas-Silġ and descending to Marsaxlokk. This is not the most efficient route for the transportation of bulk commodities from Żejtun to the bay, and may have been shaped by historic considerations, such as linking the Roman villa with Tas-Silġ.

The area also includes a number of Punic remains. A rock-cut tomb was discovered in June 1992, during the construction of an extension to the cemeteries near the church.

== History ==
=== Medieval chapel ===
The origins of the church are unclear. In the 19th century, historians linked the foundation of the church with the expulsion of the Arabs, following Count Roger's presumed raid in 1090/91. These links betrayed attempts to pre-date the veneration of St Catherine of Alexandria with the Byzantine-Greek community living on Malta prior to the Muslim invasions of the 9th century. Modern historians, however, argue that Christianity in Malta was reintroduced by King Roger in 1127, and consolidated itself thereafter. Following Sicily, and on the Byzantine character of the iconography of post-Islamic times, it appears that Greek influence at first was supreme, though the Normans themselves usually favoured the Latin clergy, especially the higher clergy.

Some historians maintain that the foundations of the old parish of Żejtun date back as early as the 12th century, when the musical sector of the Cathedral of Mdina was instituted, and the original chapel is in fact believed to have been built on land that formed part of the revenue of the Cathedral precentor – “La prebenda di santa Caterina.” The church continued to be funded by the Cathedral Precentor over the following centuries, with the coats of arms of several of incumbents appearing on the vestry walls.

In any case, by the 14th century, a small early medieval chapel dedicated to St Catherine served the south eastern region of Malta. It was already a parish church in the early 15th century, and was one of the eight mother churches on Malta. In fact, in 1436, the church appeared in the de Mello rollo. Bishop Senatore de Mello asked four cathedral canons to investigate and list all prebends, (Note: Prebends are the property or other source of an endowment used to pay the stipends of canons) canons and other beneficiaries in the diocese of Malta, as well as the incomes and the names of all priests benefiting from these sources. In this list, or rollo, twelve chapels are listed as the first form of the islands' parishes. The chapel of St Catherine of Żejtun was included in this list under the village name 'Bisqallin.'

This chapel stood halfway between the two old cores of Żejtun, that is, half a mile distant from Bisqallin and Ħal Bisbut. This chapel had a rectangular shape, with a simple façade. It had a pointed arched entrance and roofed with the local xorok method. Probably, the present church was built on the footprint of the old chapel, with the current building's nave now corresponding with the old chapel walls. The old chapel's façade, however, was turned northwards – as is a statue of St Gregory just outside the church grounds – and faced the Cathedral of Mdina, the old medieval capital in the centre of the island. The small and primitive medieval chapel served as the parish church of Żejtun for a long period of time.

The lands administered from this chapel were very large. The parish incorporated the whole south-eastern portion of Malta, and was the farthest parish from the fortified city of Mdina. All the lands making up today's Żejtun, Ħaż-Żabbar, Ħal Għaxaq, San Ġorġ ta’ Birzebbugia, Marsaxlokk, Delimara, St Thomas' Bay and Marsascala, as well as a number of other small villages and lost hamlets, all fell under the parish's direct responsibility.

In addition to this wide territorial responsibility, or possibly because of it, the Church enjoyed a greater variety of ecclesiastical services and celebrations when compared to the other early parishes in Malta, with the Church being second only to the Mdina Cathedral.

By 1470, the church building had become a recognised national and international landmark and shrine, with sailors commending themselves for the saint's intercession: "God help us and St. Catherine of Malta." (Note: (in Italian) Die n‟ai‟ e Santa Caterina di Malta) In fact, on the outer walls of the church, there are various maritime related graffiti. St Catherine was the protector of sailors and those who work in lighthouses. Other graffiti include the star of David punctured by an arrow.

=== Rebuilding and enlargement ===
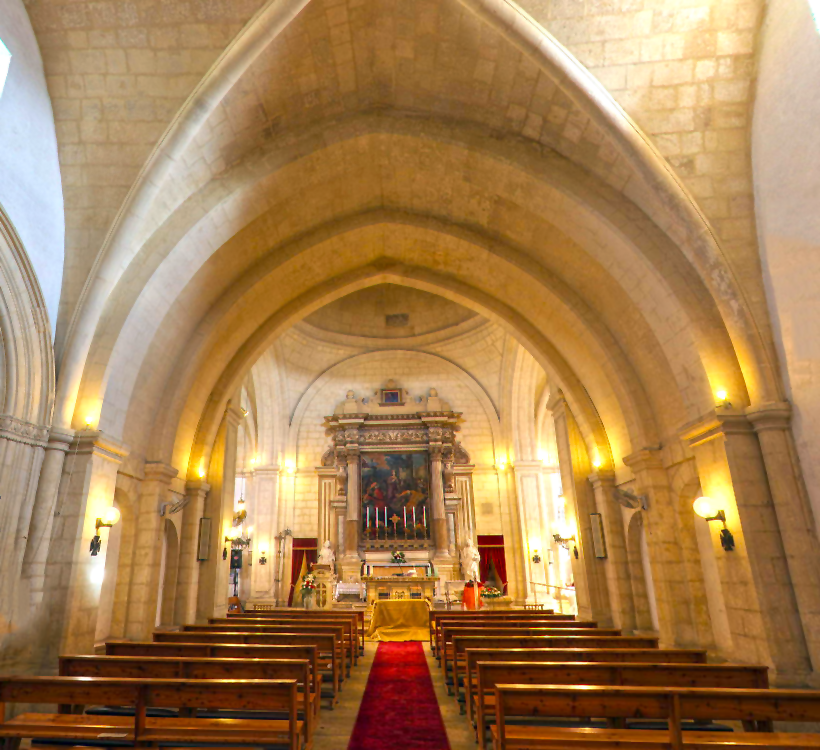
Nave with true Gothic quadripartite vault at St Catherine's Old Church.

The original chapel remained in use until 1492, when it was rebuilt and enlarged. This was commemorated by an inscription, which has since been lost. (Note: (in Latin) Hoc opus fieri fecerunt Venerabilis Czullus dictu Baldu, et honorabiles Paulus Dalli, et Jacobus Bonnici Procuratores S. Catharinae de Zeitun – MCCCCLXXXXII – Ultimo Februarii X indictionis) The Maltese historian Gian Francesco Abela noted how the church was rebuilt, quoting this inscription in his writings. The same inscription was repeated by A. Ferris in 1866 and E.B. Vella in 1927. While there is a faded and partial Latin inscription in the dome, this reads differently from the one reported in other sources. (Note: (in Latin) Rmo D.N. PAULO. V. ANIISI. N. THO. GARGALLO. MATTH. BURLO REGITre PROCUr LEONA ET MARIO TABUNI THO. BONICIO PAULO ABELA et FRANCO XUEREB OFFICIOSUS HUIUS PAROCHIAE POPULUS AELEMOSYNIS TEMM(?) ZA MINI SANCTUS ... AMPLIORE VE NUSTIOREMQ FORMAN REDEGIT ANNO D. MDCVI) According to this later inscription, the church was enlarged in 1606 during the episcopate of Bishop Gargallo, and the office of archpriest M. Burlo. This further enlargement must have consisted in the addition of a transept vaulted with a true Gothic quadripartite vault, which is an unusual feature in Maltese churches. The church also has a sizable parvis.

Using information from the apostolic visit by Mgr. Pietro Dusina in 1575, Gian Francesco Abela noted how the Cathedral precentor drew around 500 scudi in annual income from the lands belonging to St Catherine's Old Church.

According to a number of inscriptions, the bosses of the arches' intersections in the rib-groins were erected in 1593 and 1603 respectively. With the addition of the transept, this was the first church in Malta to be given the form of a latin cross. With the crossing of the main axis of the enlarged church, and the construction of a new transept, a dome was probably erected in 1606, the date in the dome inscription. The dome is low and saucer-like in shape, and is probably one of the earliest examples still in existence in Malta.

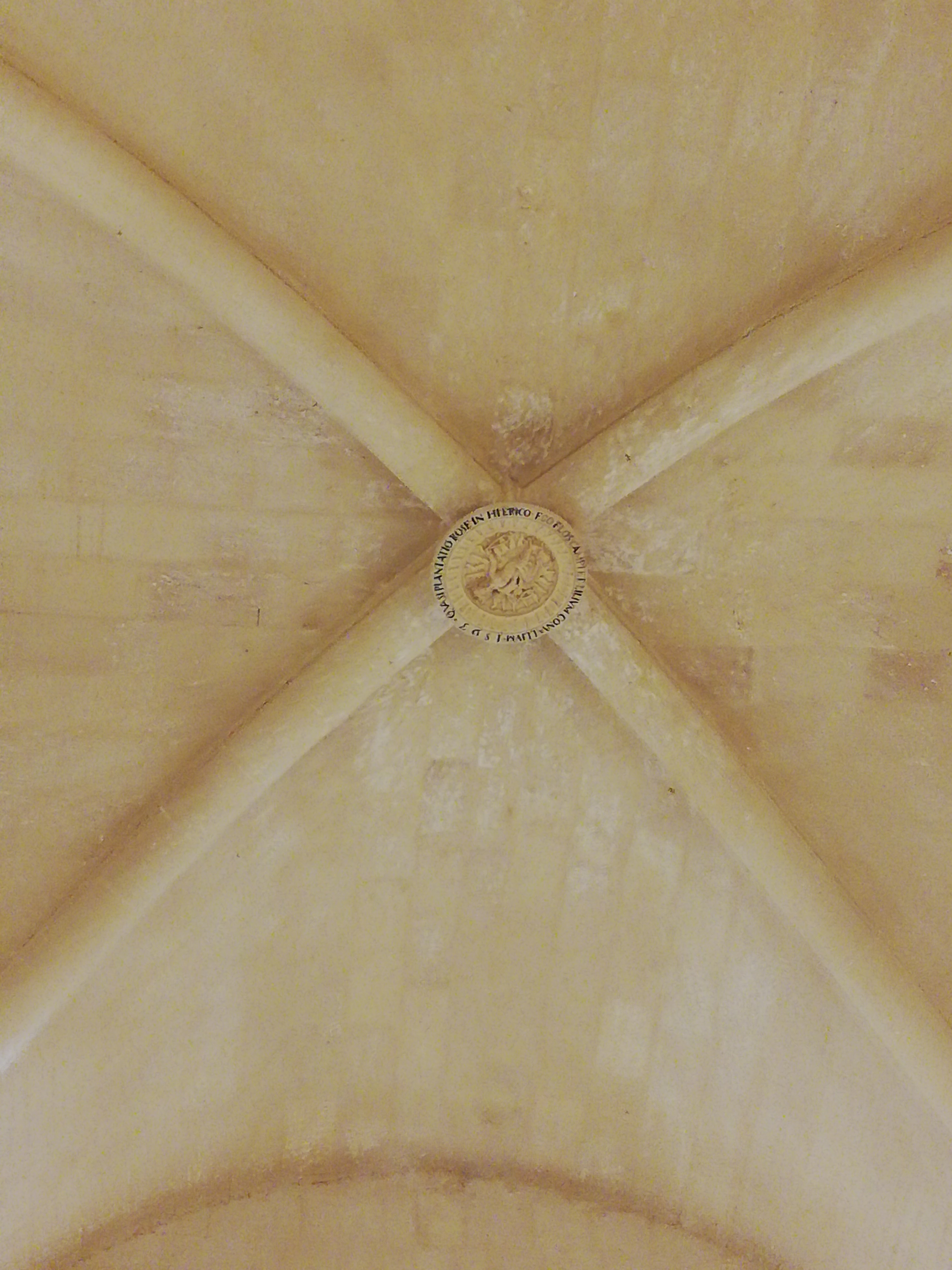
Detail of the northern semitransept of Saint Catherine's Old Church, with an inscription marking the year 1593.

The main façade has a Renaissance doorway, with flanked by a set of pilasters crowned by an architrave, a cornice and a circular oculus in the masonry above. A small bell-cot, probably added later and constructed out of reused stones, rests on the gable, which straightens out on each side with a low parapet wall. Both the transept and the parapet walls are buttressed externally. The buttresses on the nave walls were added in the 19th century, and were the design of Giuseppe Hyzler. The buttress supporting the transept's walls, however, is larger and far older – giving the eastern side of the church the appearance of a fortress.

In fact, the church was used as part of the defences of the Hospitaller Knights of St John the Baptist against the Ottoman Turks. The new transept, nearly a third higher than the nave, provided commanding views of the nearby bays. High within the walls of the transept, a corridor was inserted with windows lined up on the sites of two new low lying forts, which were to be built at St Thomas, Marsascala, and St Lucian in Marsaxlokk. Hence, St Catherine's old church became an intermediate military signalling point, forewarning Mdina, Cottonera and Valletta about any attack by Ottoman navy ships entering these nearby ports.

=== 1614 Raid ===
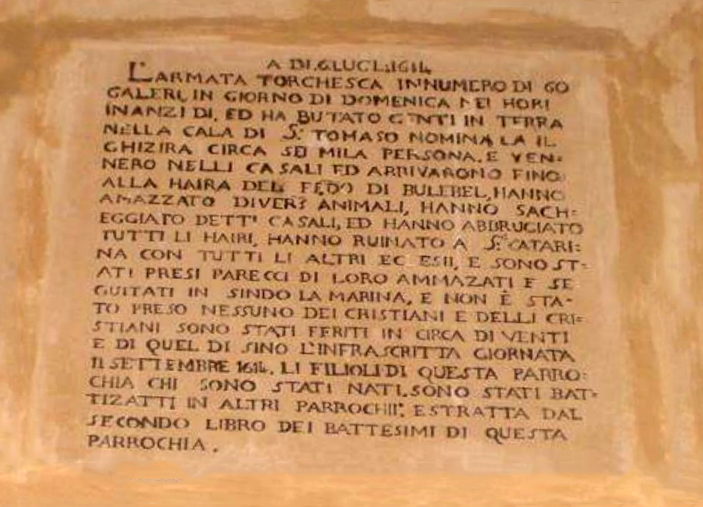
Commemorative plaque of the raid on St Catherine's Old Church.

On July 6, 1614, an Ottoman force of sixty ships (including 52 galleys) under the command of Khalil Pasha tried to land at Marsaxlokk Bay, but were repelled by the artillery from the newly constructed St Lucian Tower. The fleet laid anchor at St Thomas Bay in Marsaskala, and landed 5,000 to 6,000 men unopposed. Some of the Ottomans attacked St Lucian Tower, while the rest of the force pillaged the village of Żejtun. The raiders burnt the farms and fields of the area, and damaged St Catherine's Old Church. The attack is described in a commemorative plaque engraved close to the main altar of the church, which states that:

"In the early hours of Sunday, July 6, 1614, a Turkish army landed from 60 galleys, disembarking six thousand men in the place called Ghizira in Saint Thomas’ creek. The Turks raided the nearby casali, arriving right up to the farmlands held under the feud of Bulebel. They sacked these townships, burnt farmland and did much damage to the main church of Saint Catherine’s and all the others. Many were caught and killed, and they were made to retire back to the quays. No Christian was captured, but twenty were injured in the attack. From that day until September 11, 1614, all those born in this parish had to be baptised elsewhere. Extracted from the second book of baptisms for this parish."

The finding of human bones in a number of secret passages of this church was, for many years, linked with this attack.

=== French period ===
During the Maltese uprising against the French, the church was fortified and used as a hospital for wounded soldiers.

=== Restoration ===
The church was restored in 2007, with public authorities investing Lm63,000 (€146,751) in rehabilitation works. While the condition of the church was good, localised defects were found in the masonry. Preventive protection works included the replacement of crumbling stone, the clean up of the front, the removal of the cement cover on the lower parts of the façades and re-pointing to avoid water seepage. Part of the church parvis was also re-laid.

== Interior description ==
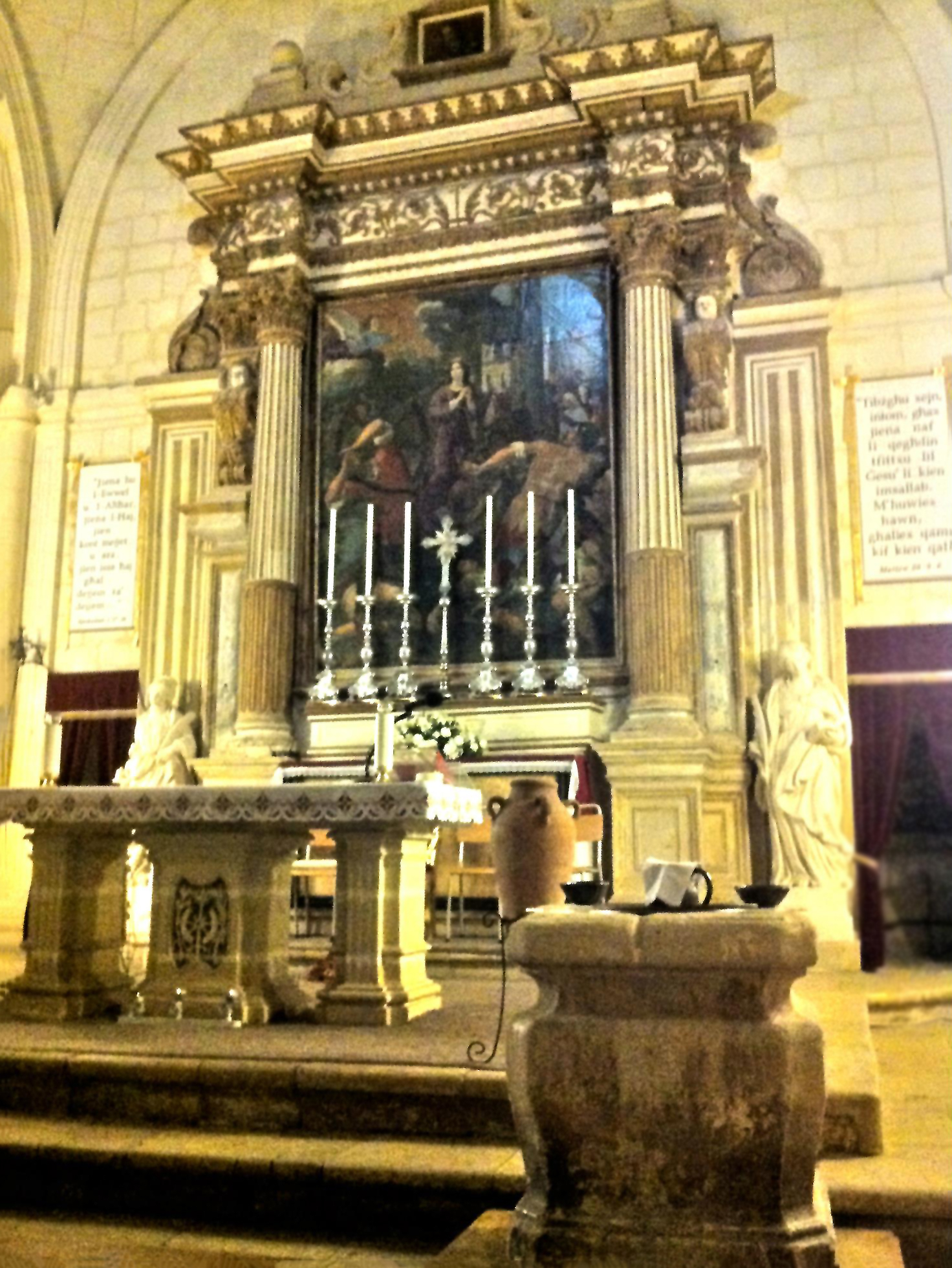
Main altar of St Catherine's Old Church.

The interior of the church blends various architectural styles, with notes of vernacular artistry. The church has three altars. The high altar piece depicts the martyrdom of St Catherine, and is an interesting 17th century work of art. The side altars are dedicated to Pope St. Gregory and Our Lady of Mount Carmel. The latter bears the coat-of-arms of Grand Master Perellos, while the former has the arms of the city of Mdina and a Prior of Iberia, Fra. Pietro Gonzales.

The painting on the main altar is not of high artistic quality, however it replaces another prestigious painting of the martyrdom of St Catherine – now housed at the Żejtun Parish Museum – which is attributed to the Maltese painter Cassarino, in imitation of Caravaggio. This latter painting returns striking similarities with the Beheading of Saint John the Baptist and other famous paintings by Caravaggio. The titular painting rests in a stone framework, with a statue on each side. On the left, there is a statue of St Catherine, while on the right one of St Euphemia. These statues used to adorn the Cappella d'Italia at St John's Co-Cathedral, and were placed in Żejtun once they were replaced by marble statues.

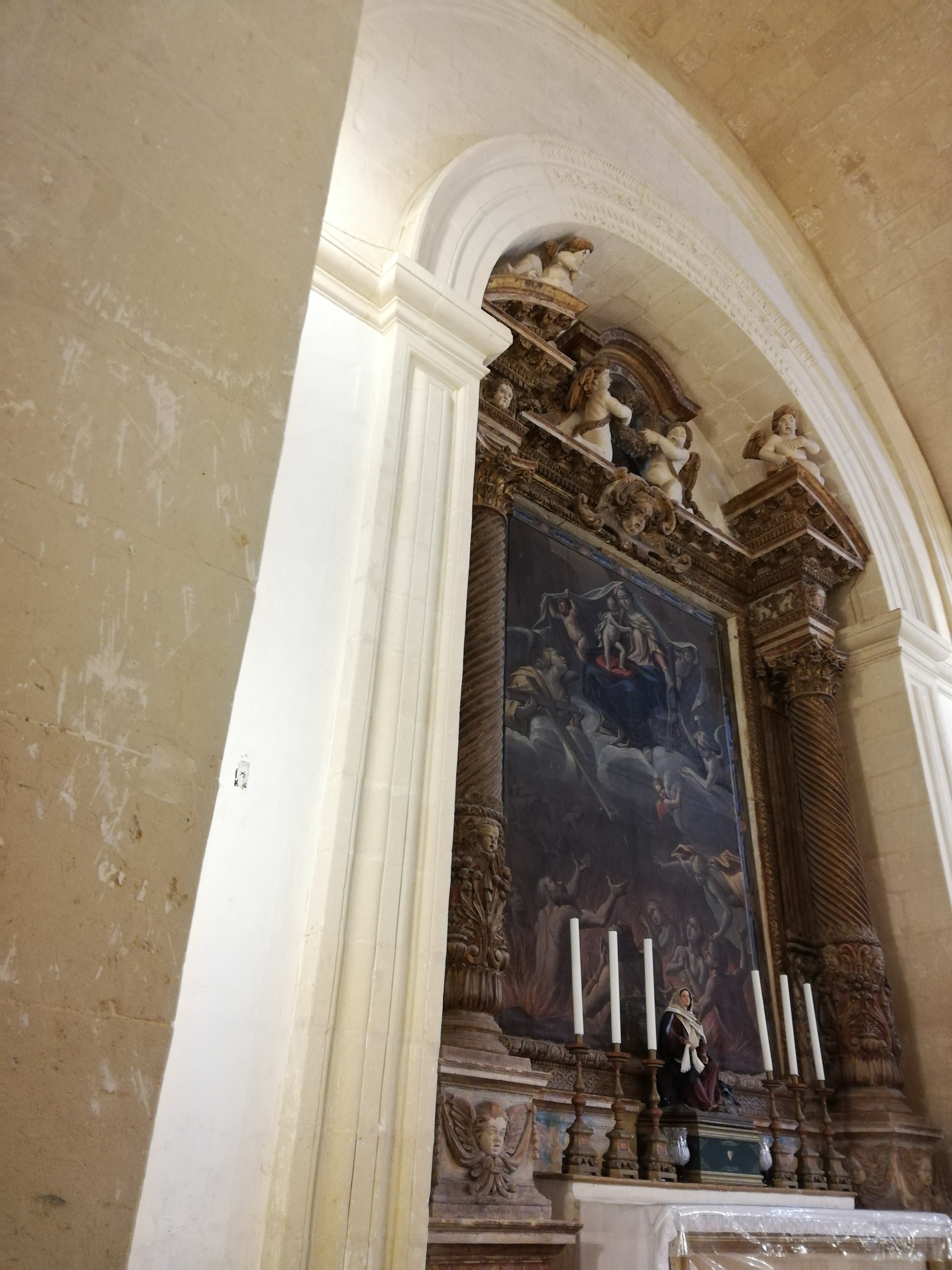
The northern altar at the Church, now dedicated to Our Lady of Mount Carmel, was originally dedicated to Our Lady of the Rosary.

The northern altar, today dedicated to Our Lady of Mount Carmel, was originally dedicated to Our Lady of the Rosary. The old painting of this original dedication is also found in the Parish Museum, and was named by Bishop Cagliares in his pastoral visit in 1615. While the author of the current painting of Our Lady of Mount Carmel remains unknown, it was paid by Grand Master Perellos, whose coat-of-arms is included in the painting. The façade of the altar is enriched by Baroque sculpture and columns, adorned with the coat-of-arms of Grand Master Cotoner. This altar also houses a statue of St Michael, a Spanish school wood carving, which was brought to the church in the 19th century, along with another statue of St Joseph.

The southern altar is dedicated to Pope St Gregory, with another painting by Cassarino, following Caravaggio's methods. A Via Sagra cross, with the symbols of the Passion of Christ is also found on this side of the church. Two doorways allow access to the sacristy, which houses an impressive arched ceiling. This sacristy contains the coat-of-arms of the precentors of the Mdina Cathedral. Each precentor's years in office are marked, and his life and pastoral achievements are detailed in a short narrative. These start from the left-hand door, and keep running to the one on the right of the sacristy. These coat-of-arms are not contemporary with the two different church buildings dedicated to the St Catherine, as the first name listed, that of precentor R. Bartholomeus Asciach, served between 1372 and 1391, centuries before the sacristy was built.

=== Passageways ===
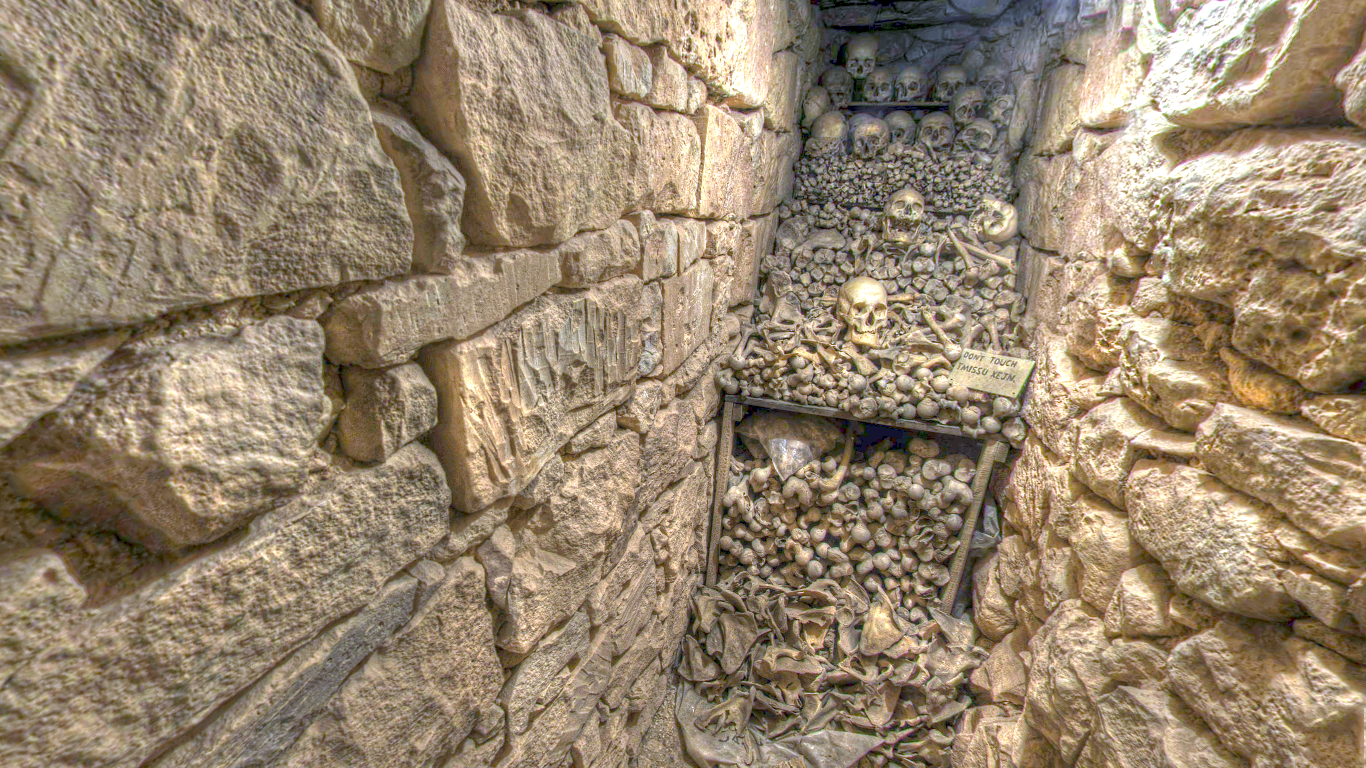
Secret passageway, with stacked bones, in St Catherine's Old Church.

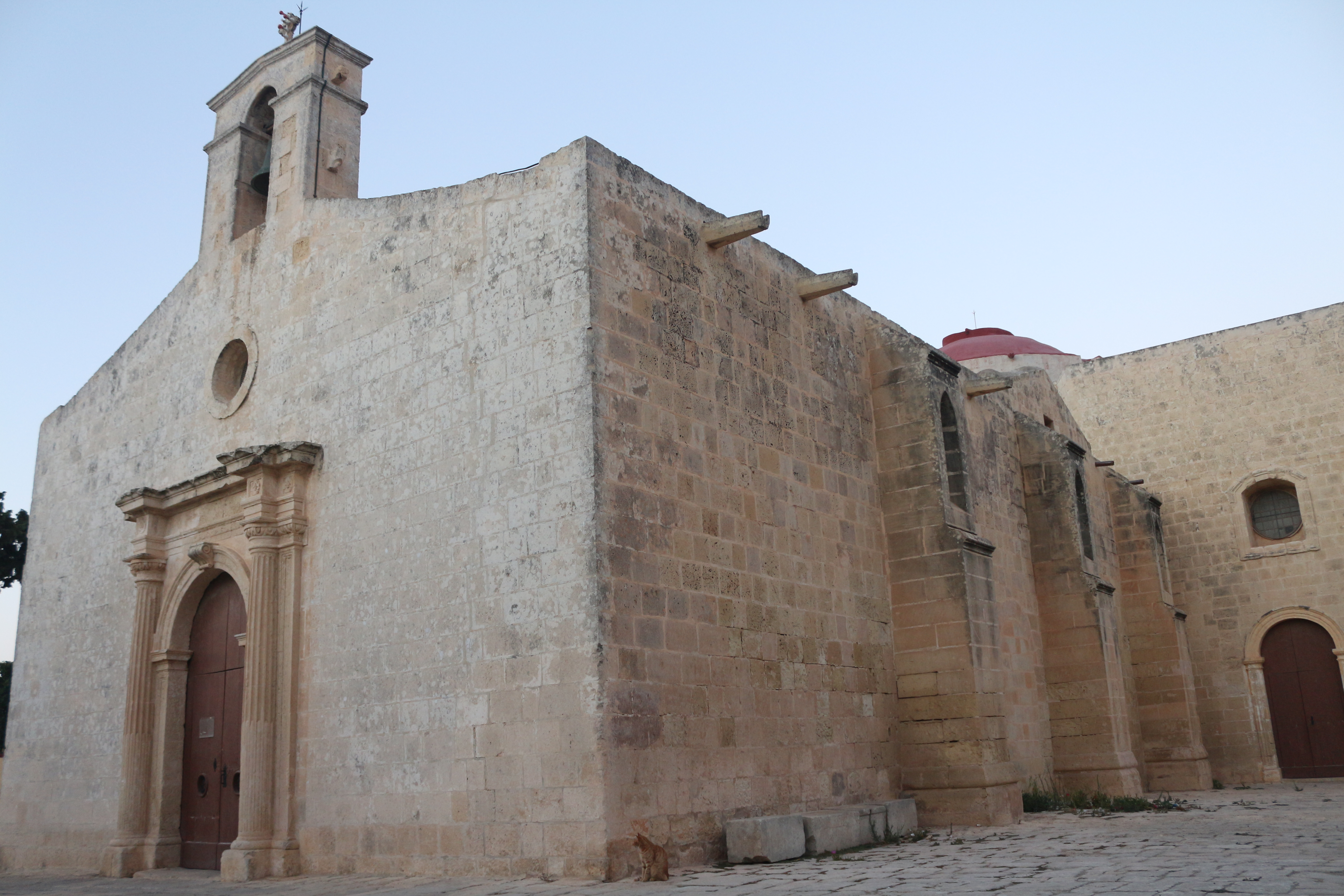
The secret passageways were found during waterproofing works on the dome.

In April 1969, local newspapers reported the finding of a large number of human bones, and three secret passageways which were uncovered by workmen. Local legends always narrated the existence of secret passages within the walls of the old church, but over the years attempts to prove this proved futile.

The discovery took place when three workmen, Ċikku Żammit, Carmelo Spiteri and his sixteen year old nephew Grezzju Vella were waterproofing the church's vaulted roof. Vella was working near the flat dome of the church and unwittingly began to scrape at a narrow crack between two stone slabs. When the crack widened, he threw a stone inside, expecting to hear it go down into the church. Instead it appeared to fall nearby, and Vella realised that there must be something underneath the roof. Vella called the others, and soon they were joined by Fr. Palmier, who was responsible for the church, and by Ġan-Marì Debono, who was the sacristan.

On removing of a large stone slab, a dark void appeared. As only Vella could pass through the hole in the roof, he was tied to a rope and given a box of matches to inspect the site. The boy came upon a number of human skeletons, a discovery which left him deeply traumatised. Vella only returned to the church in 2011, notwithstanding that he lives only a few kilometres away.

At the beginning of the third secret corridor, some engravings bearing the initials V.A. and C.Z. were found – along with the date 19.02.09. This indicated that the corridors had already been discovered prior to 1969. After the last discovery, the parish priest traced a certain Carmelo Zahra who confessed that he had entered the passages when he was a young boy together with some other individuals. He claimed that they had seen skeletons dressed as soldiers in the passages and that they had some weapons and flags with them. According to Zahra, these remains disappeared and he was warned not to mention the discovery again.

The few remains that were collected during the 1969 discovery included a wooden shoe sole with a high heel, a small gilded wooden cross of Byzantine design, odd bits of a gilded wooden frame (perhaps an icon), three coins (two bronze with the cross of the Order, the other gold), pieces of pottery of the 16th and 17th centuries, fragments of animal bones and a part of a chain-mail armour vest. These remains are stored in one of the rooms of the church.

No evidence exists on the provenance of the bones, or how they ended up in these secret passages. Speculation suggests that these were the bones of unfortunate victims of the 1614 Turkish raid, while others suggest the void was used as an ossuary. Between 1978 and 1980 studies on the bones indicated that the skeletons had probably been exhumed and moved there from a cemetery. Moreover, it was found that the skeletal remains belonged to individuals who had died within a short period of time.

== St Gregory's procession ==
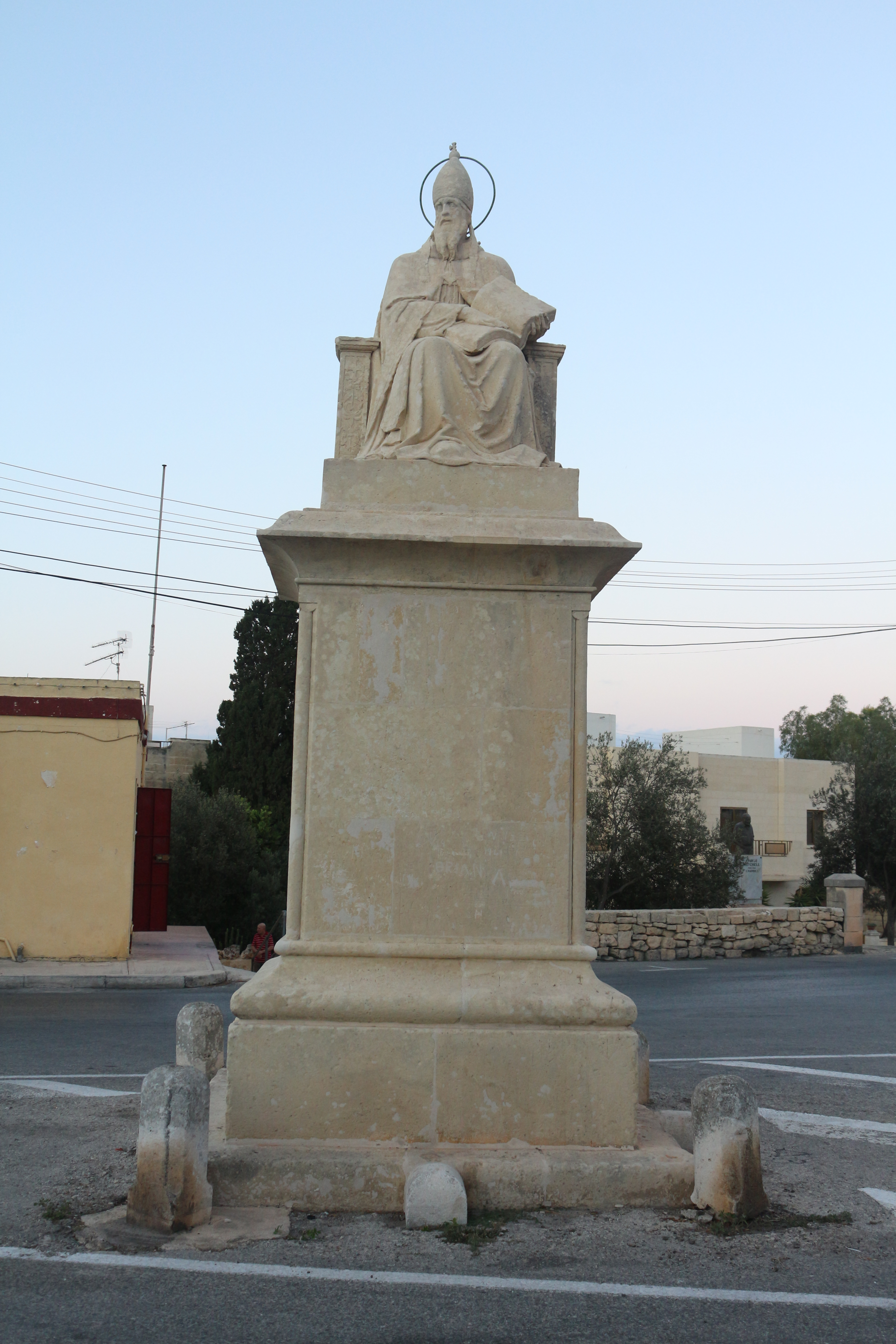
Statue of St Gregory the Great, outside the grounds of St Catherine's Old Church.

The feast of St Gregory was one of the principal traditional feasts on the islands, involving a procession composed of confraternities from all the parishes on the islands. The origin of this feast was unknown for centuries, with the common belief that it related to a general vow by the populace on their deliverance from a great plague in 1519. Recent studies have concluded that the procession was first held in 1543 by Bishop Domenico Cubelles, in response to a papal call for prayers for peace. Originally the feast was held on March 12, the feast day of St Gregory, and was later moved to Easter Wednesday.

The procession included the respective clergy from all the islands' towns and villages, the canons of the Mdina Cathedral and the bishop, who assembled together – initially starting from Mdina, thence walking to Żejtun. On their way, the whole company joined in the litany, as pronounced by the chief priest of each confraternity. On their arrival at Żejtun, the procession visits St Catherine's Old Church. At a particular point of the ceremony, the crowd exclaimed aloud for three times the word 'Misericordia.' The remaining part of the day was then spent in eating and feasting, and other kinds of amusements.

Grand Master Perellos built a palace in Żejtun, on the main road from Tarxien, to attend the feast on the occasion of the annual procession. Grand Masters took it upon them to visit this national procession, with a large following of noblemen and grandees. A large part of St Gregory Street in Żejtun, the main axis between the new parish church and St Catherine's Old Church, has palaces and grand houses built as residences for this feast day. In 1926, Bishop Mauro Caruana ended the participation of other parishes after arguments erupted between the clergy of Birkirkara and Isla, on the order of precedence in the procession. Following these simplifications, the procession began at Raħal Ġdid, or Tarxien.

A statue of Pope St Gregory stands outside the church's grounds. The statue is the work of Salvatore Dimech, based on designs by Vincenzo Hyzler. It was placed there in devotion to the annual procession held on the first Wednesday after Easter Sunday. The statue – like the original medieval chapel – looks on towards Mdina, whence the procession began.

== See also ==
- Culture of Malta
- History of Malta
- List of churches in Malta
- Religion in Malta

== Notes and references ==
Notes

== Bibliography ==
- Abela, Giovan-Francesco (1647). Della Descrittione di Malta Isola nel Mare Siciliano con le sue Antichita ed altre notitie. Vol. 3. P. Bonacota.
- Bacci, Michele; Rohde, Martin (2013). The Holy Portolano / Le Portulan sacré. Walter de Gruyter GmbH & Co KG. ISBN 978-3-11-036425-5.
- Badger, George Percy (1838). Description of Malta and Gozo. England: M. Weiss.
- Ferris, Achille (1985) [1866]. Descrizione storica delle chiesi di Malta e Gozo. Valletta: Midsea Books.
- Vella, E.B., (1927), Storja taż-Żejtun u Marsaxlokk. Malta.
