= Church of St Catherine, Żejtun =

Church of St Catherine
- The Parish church of St Catherine of Alexandria
- Knisja Arċipretali ta' Santa Katerina
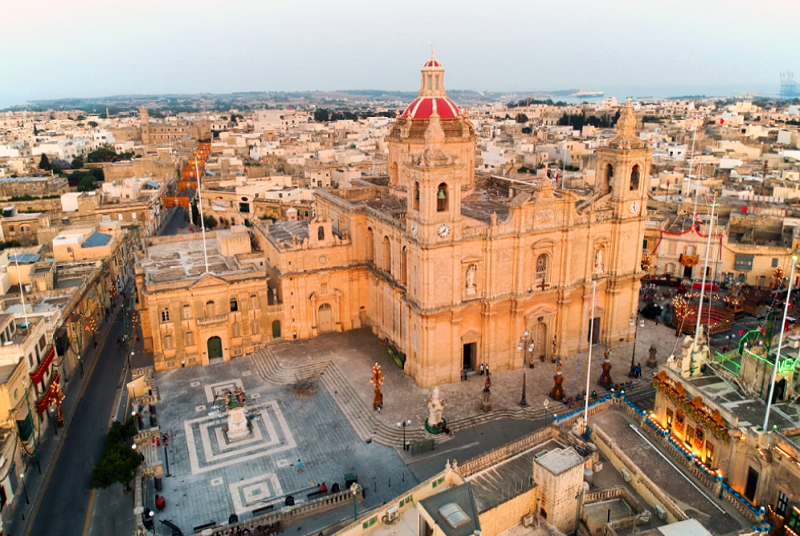
- Church of St Catherine
- 35°51′18.7″N 14°32′01.1″E
- Location: Żejtun, Malta
- Denomination: Roman Catholic
- Website: www.zejtunparish.com

History
- Founded: 1692
- Dedication: St Catherine of Alexandria
- Consecrated: 11 May 1742

Architecture
- Years built: 1692-1778
- Completed: 1778

Specifications
- Materials: Limestone

Administration
- Archdiocese: Malta

The Church of St Catherine (Maltese: Knisja Arċipretali ta' Santa Katerina), Żejtun, is a Roman Catholic church, the seat of the archpriest of Żejtun and the mother church of various parishes established from the originally larger territory of the Żejtun parish. The parish church, its oratory and an adjacent pastoral centre form a complex of Grade 1 and 2 listed buildings in the centre of town. The Church and its complex sit in front of the Il-Gwiedi quarter, commanding views from both the Tal-Barrani and Triq l-Aħħar Ħbit mit-Torok town approaches.

Its dedication to Catherine of Alexandria dates back to an original church standing 500 metres (1,600 ft) from this site, extant from at least the fifteenth century, and was one of the eight mother churches on Malta. The church, dating from the late 17th century, was designed in the Maltese baroque style by Lorenzo Gafà. Its construction was part of an urbanisation programme in Żejtun spearheaded by Gregorio Bonici. The church is one of the most famous and most recognisable sights of Żejtun. Its dome, framed by the spires of its clock towers, have dominated the town's skyline for 300 years.

Colloquially known as the Cathedral of the East (Maltese: Il-Katidral tal-Lvant), the church bears an imposing facade and a large internal dome. The church houses various important pieces of art, such as The Martyrdom of St Catherine, an 18th-century copy of the artwork by Mattia Preti in the Church of St Catherine in Valletta.

St Catherine's is a working church with prayer and daily mass services.

== History ==
The church was built to replace the old parish church of St Catherine, more commonly known as St Gregory's, which is located in the vicinity of the present parish church. The church was built as a result of Żejtun's increasing population. The land on which the church is built was donated by Girgor Bonici and Tumas Abela.

The villagers had preferred to build their new church to the west of St Gregory's, rather than the east, because this area was far too exposed to attacks from the enemy. A central location was chosen for the new parish church, which thus found itself in the focal point of the developing community. Today the church is located in the heart of the village. In 1692 Gregorio Bonici, a former mayor of Mdina, bought a large plot of land right in the centre of Żejtun to build the new church. He not only bought the land but also contributed substantially throughout the next 30 years to finance the construction of the church. The residents of Żejtun contributed by offering to work in the construction for free on holidays and in the evenings. The architect was the famous Lorenzo Gafà.

The foundation stone was laid by Bishop Davide Cocco Palmieri on 25 November 1692, with Ugolino Bonnici as archpriest. The church was consecrated on 11 May 1742. Artists such as Enrico Regnaud, Gio Nicola Buhagiar and Francesco Zahra all contributed towards magnifying the interior beauty of this church. The latter was the most talented artist of this period, whose presence in Żejtun was secured at an early age because his father, Pietro Paolo, was working on the stone carvings within the same church. The two side naves were finished in 1778.

The church is listed on the National Inventory of the Cultural Property of the Maltese Islands.

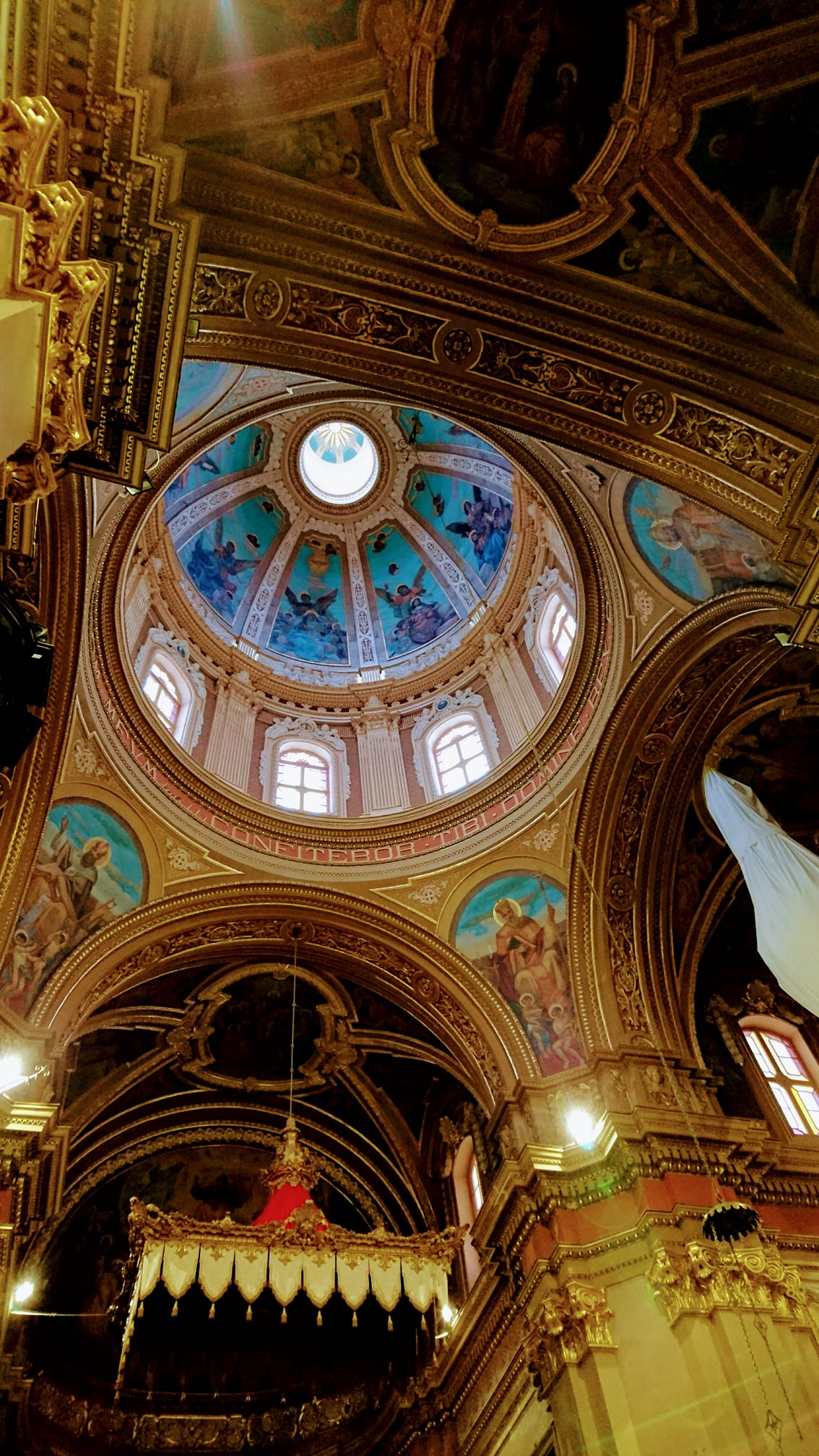
Dome and interior view of the Church, 2018.
