= Ħal Tmiem =

Ħal Tmiem Hal Tmim Rahal Timin
- Suburb
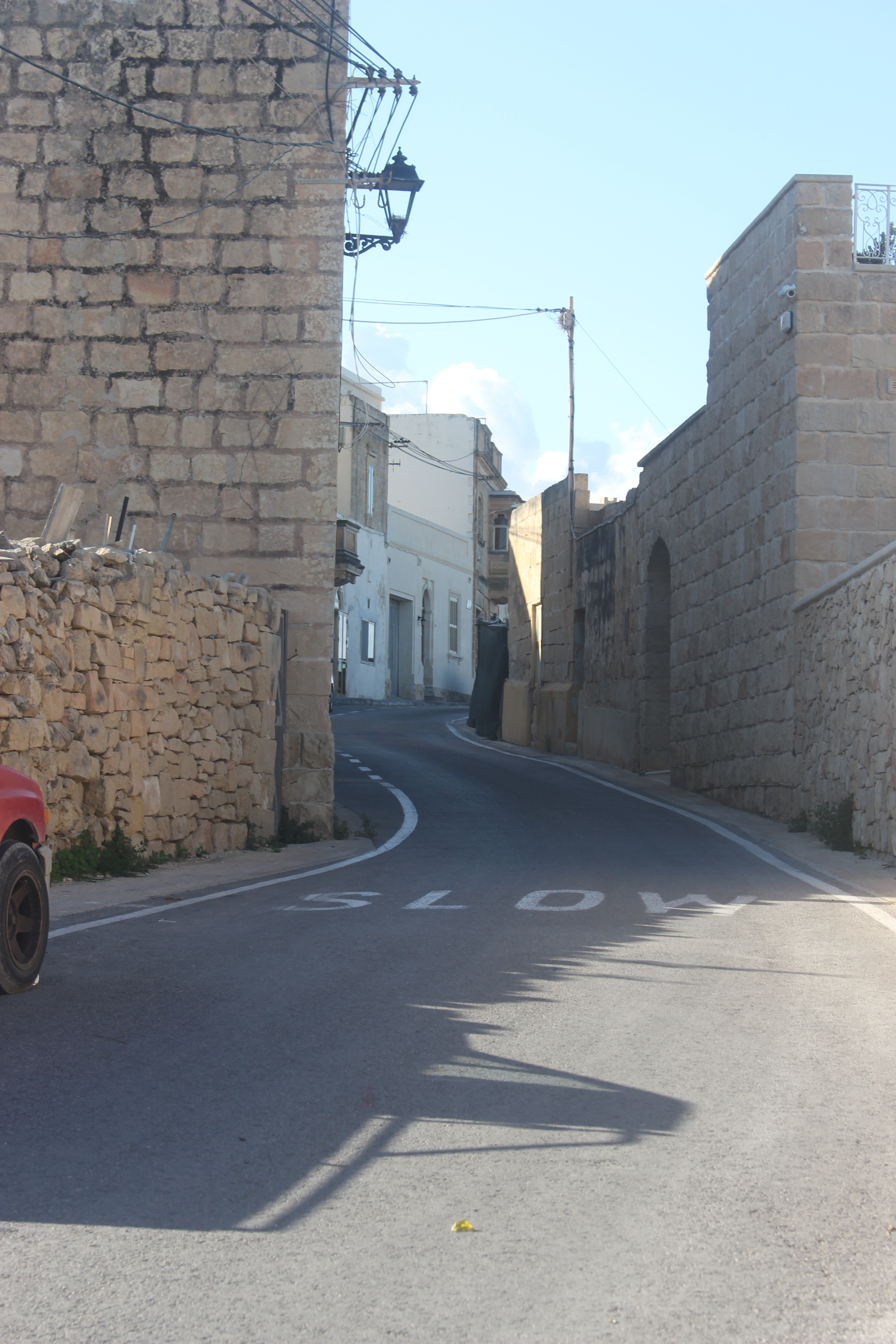
- "Triq Wied iz-Ziju". The main road within Ħal Tmiem

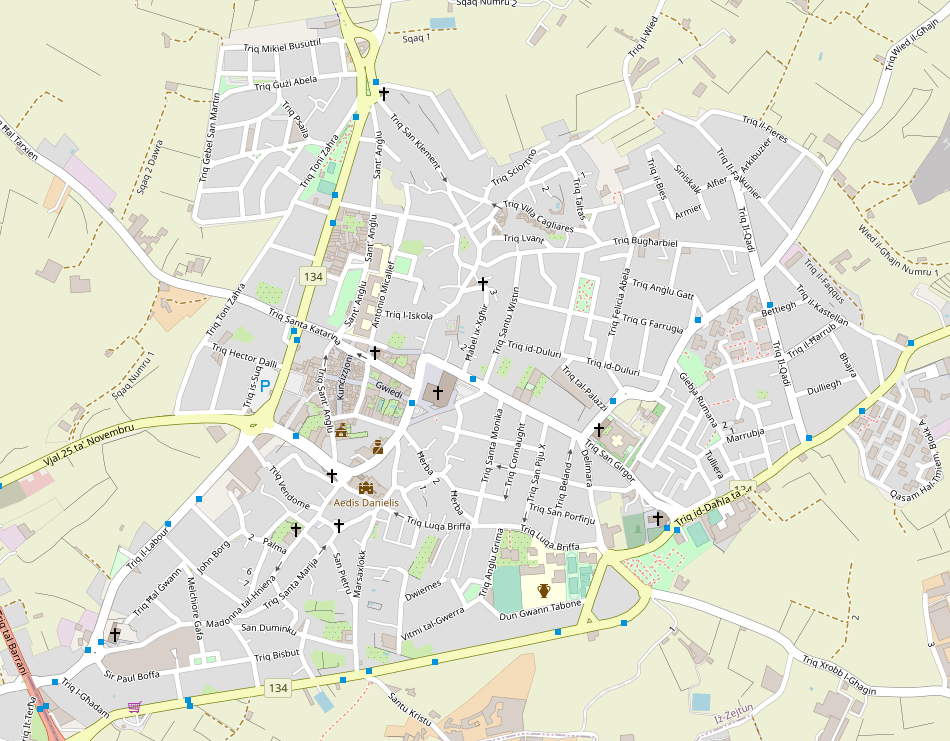

- Location within Malta
- Coordinates: 35°51′17″N 14°32′43″E
- Country: Malta
- Region: South Eastern Region
- District: South Eastern District
- Local council: Żejtun
- Established: 1419
- Founder: Leonardo Tabone
- Named for: Temim Assant

Area
  - Total: 0.11 km^{2} (0.042 sq mi)
- Elevation: 53 m (174 ft)

Ħal Tmiem is a suburb of Żejtun, Malta. Located 1.13 kilometres (3,700 ft) east of the city center, it covers an area of 0.11 square kilometres (27 acres).

== Name ==
Unlike common belief that the town is named "Tmiem"^{1} due to it being on the outskirts of the much-larger town of Zejtun, the suburb's name is actually derived from "Temim Assant" which is the name of an Arabic individual who lived in the area. Its name then changed through the following:

- “raħal timin” (1498)
- “raħal timil” (1534)
- “raħal Chimin” (1538)
- “racal timin” (1538)
- “ta’ ħal timin” (1593)

== Chapel of St Mary of Ħal Tmin ==
This chapel was founded in 1597 by Leonardo Tabone and is dedicated to the Assumption of Mary. It remains active and is used to teach catechism classes and other religions actives and meetings.

== Notes ==
- ^{1}"Tmiem" means "End" in the Maltese Language.
