= Dun Pawl Branchel =

Dun Pawl Branchel (Fr. Paul Branchel) was the first chaplain (Archpriest) of Zejtun. He was already chaplain in 1436 and stayed at this place till 1492. At that time the parish church of Zejtun was that of "San Girgor" (Saint Gregory), and also was smaller than today. The parish of Zejtun at that time was including also the new parishes of Zabbar, Ghaxaq, Marsaxlokk, Marsascala and part of Birzebbuga of today.
