= Andrea Belli =

Maltese architect and businessman (1703–1772)

- Born: 13 October 1703; Valletta, Hospitaller Malta
- Died: 19 October 1772 (aged 69)
- Occupations: architect and businessman
- Notable work: Auberge de Castille
- Style: Baroque
- Spouse: Teresa Gam (m. 1737)
- Children: 1
- Parents: Giuseppe Belli (father); Francesca Romano (mother)

Andrea Belli (13 October 1703 – 19 October 1772) was a Maltese architect and businessman. He designed several Baroque buildings, including Auberge de Castille in Valletta, which is now the Office of the Prime Minister of Malta.

== Life and career ==
He was born in Valletta on 13 October 1703 to the surgeon Giuseppe Belli and his wife Francesca Romano. He spent some time in Venice as a youth, and he later traveled to Austria and Germany.

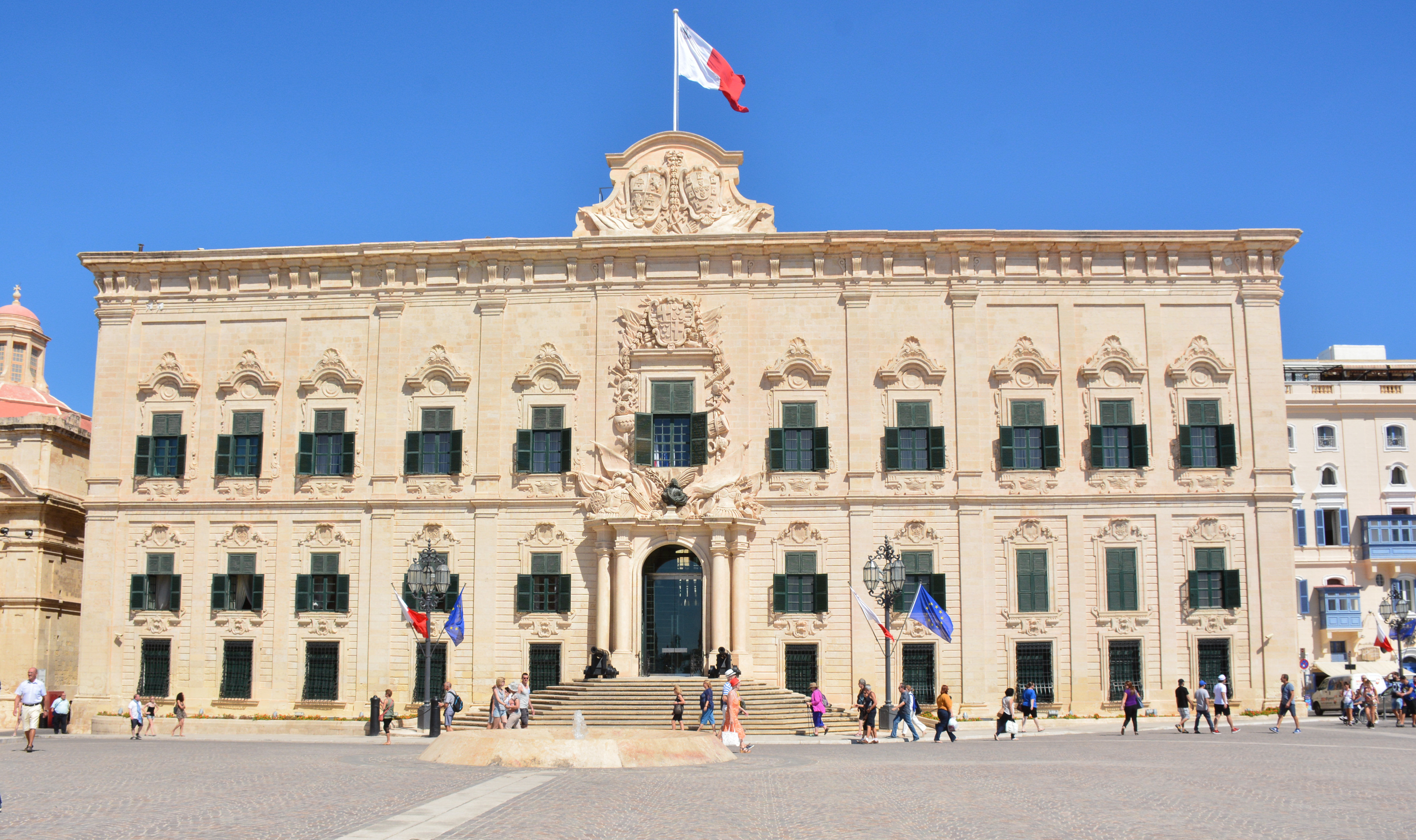
Auberge de Castille, Belli's masterpiece

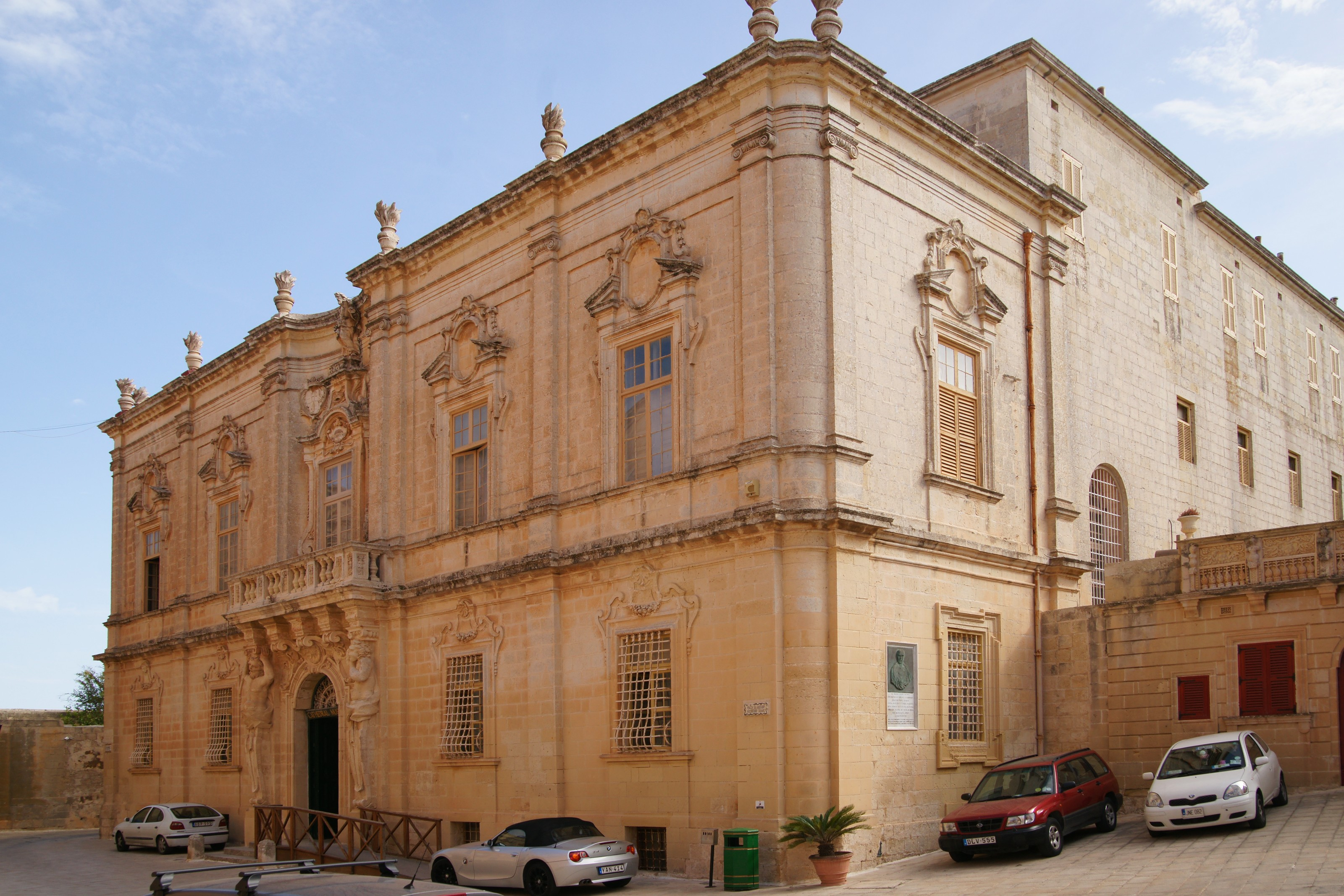
The Mdina Seminary (now the Cathedral Museum), which is attributed to Belli

As an entrepreneur, Belli became a successful businessman by having achieved monopoly from Grand Master Pinto over the export of Maltese limestone and other products to Africa, Asia and Europe.

Belli became an architect, and he designed several buildings in the Baroque style. A possible portrait of him with the design of Casa Manresa (today the Curia of the Bishop) dates to his lifetime.

Under the influence of his brother Gabriele, listener of the Master Mason Pinto, Andrea got regular commissioned works by the Order of Malta as designer of the main buildings of the 18th century Maltese Baroque architecture.

Notable buildings made or attributed to him include:

- Seminary (now the Cathedral Museum), Mdina (1733–42, attributed)
- Augustinian priory, Rabat (1740)
- Auberge de Castille, Valletta (1741–45)
- Bishop's curia, Floriana (1743)
- Centrepiece of Bishop's Palace, Valletta
- Church of Our Lady of Divine Providence, Siġġiewi (1750)
- Palazzo Don Raimondo (formerly the National Museum of Fine Arts), Valletta (1761–63)
- St. Philip Neri church, Birgu (attributed)
- Palazzo Bonici, Valletta
- Chapel at Villa Cagliares in Zejtun (attributed)

Auberge de Castille is regarded as his masterpiece. Belli was also involved in business, and in 1741 he took over the firm of the Manoel Theatre. Belli married Teresa Gam on 5 June 1737, and they had one son, Giuseppe. He died on 19 October 1772 at the age of 69.
