= Ħal Ġinwi temple =

Megalithic temple remains in Malta

- Location within Malta
- 35.848306°N 14.547225°E
- Type: Temple/Settlement
- Periods: Ġgantija phase
- Location: Żejtun, Malta

Site notes
- Material: Limestone
- Excavation dates: 1917
- Archaeologists: Albert V. Laferla; Themistocles Zammit
- Condition: Destroyed
- Owner: Government of Malta
- Public access: No

The Ħal Ġinwi temple (Maltese pronunciation: [ħɐl ˈd͡ʒɪnwɪ]) was a prehistoric megalithic temple site located southeast of Żejtun, Malta dating back to the Ġgantija phase (3600–3200 BCE). The site is located in an area bearing the same name, or alternatively Ħal Ġilwi, (Note: In certain sources, the area is referred to as Ħal Ġilwi, such that the two names are used interchangeably. Moreover, Sagona reports that a house with an olive oil installation was found close by, at a site called Ħal Ġilwi.) which is known for its archaeological remains, and lies around one kilometre from the Tas-Silġ multi-period sanctuary and archaeological site.

== History ==
Remains of the temple at Ħal Ġinwi were found in the vicinity of San Niklaw chapel, to the right of the main road from Żejtun to Marsaxlokk, between Żejtun and the Tas-Silġ temple. The site is today represented by a few ashlar blocks still visible in a field wall. More remains may survive beneath the soil, since its excavation was superficial. The site was originally excavated by Albert V. Laferla in 1917. Architect Albert E. Vassallo drew the site during Laferla's archaeological excavations. Themistocles Zammit, however, interpreted the remains as a possible domestic dwelling. John D. Evans suggested that the megalithic structures resemble more a dual temple site.

== Archaeology ==
The site has five semi-rectangular rooms enclosed within a megalithic wall, and like Tal-Qadi temple, it had an anomalous form when compared with other megalithic temples in Malta. The floors were paved in hard stone or covered in beaten earth (Maltese: torba). Many pottery shards were found on site, and stone whorls, while flint and chert remains were scarce. Part of a handled cup, with a decoration of pointillé triangles was found on site, which can be compared with remains found at Capo Graziano, Filicudi, an island off Lipari. The pottery dated mainly to the Ġgantija and Tarxien phase, with very few sherds from the Tarxien cemetery phase. The site included remains of a Roman period house, with mosaic floors.

== See also ==
- List of megalithic sites
