= Villa Cagliares, Żejtun =

Baroque country villa in Żejtun, Malta

Villa Cagliares
- It-Tempju
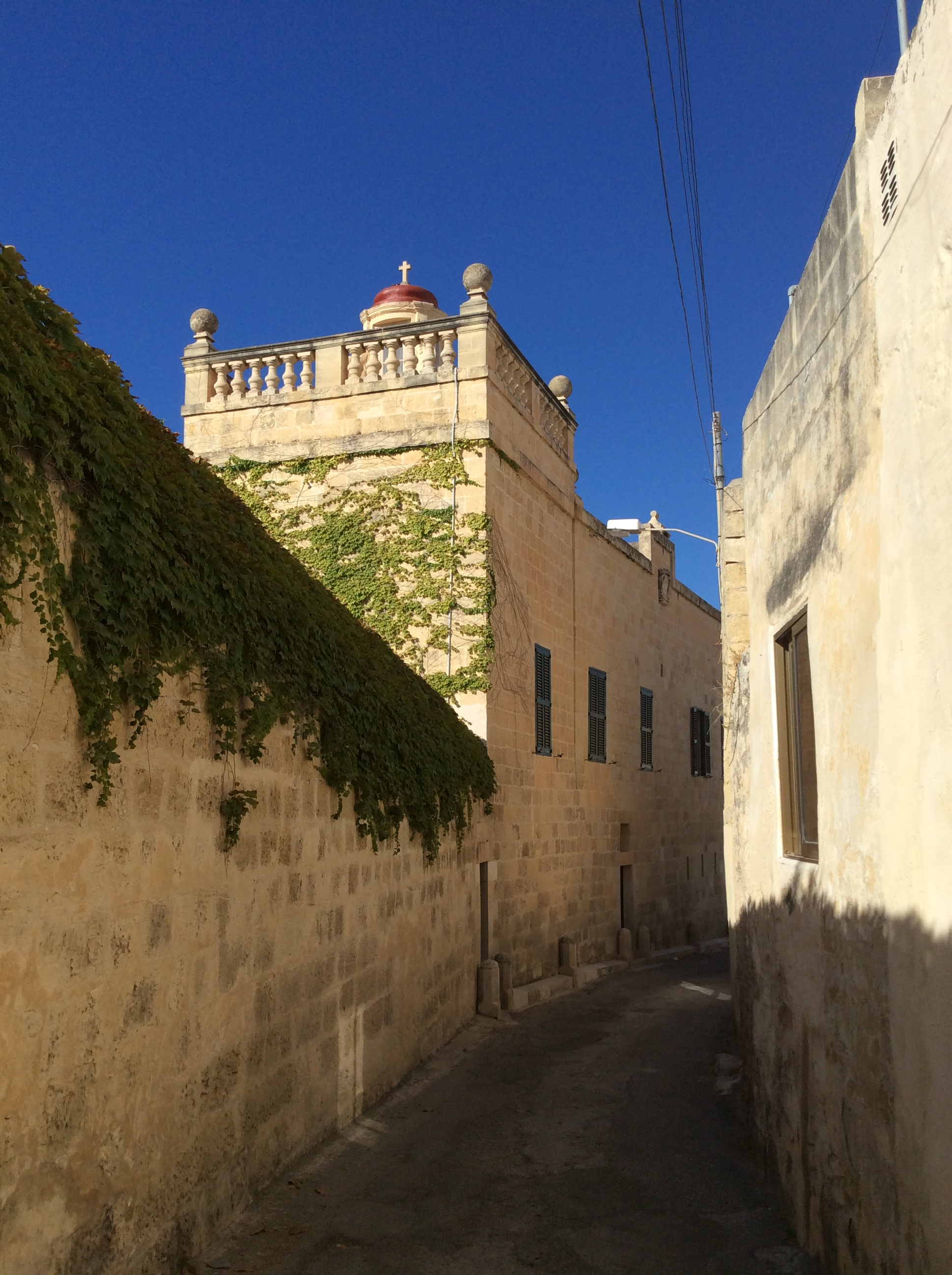
- Villa Cagliares after restoration
- Interactive map of the Villa Cagliares area

General information
- Status: Intact
- Type: Country villa
- Architectural style: Mannerist; Spanish Baroque chapel
- Location: Żejtun, Malta
- Coordinates: 35°51′34″N 14°32′11″E
- Current tenants: Private residence
- Completed: c. 1620

Technical details
- Material: Limestone
- Floor count: 2

Renovating team
- Architects: Andrea Belli (chapel attribution)

Villa Cagliares, also referred to as It-Tempju in Maltese, is a baroque country villa in Żejtun, Malta. It was built in the seventeenth century as a country villa and hunting lodge by Bishop Baldassare Cagliares. The mansion is set at the edge of Ħajt il-Wied valley, and it houses a chapel, a formal garden with a front court, and a number of unique architectural features. This villa is scheduled as a Grade 1 property by the Planning Authority.

The villa was completely restored by its present owners and serves as a private residence. In 2008, the restoration project of Villa Cagliares was awarded the Prix d'Honneur Conservation and Re-use by Din l-Art Ħelwa. The building is an important landmark in the surrounding farmland and countryside. Its small dome roofing the private chapel and surrounded by balustrades marks the skyline across the valley towards Ħaż-Żabbar.

== Early history and interior ==
Villa Cagliares stands at the edge of the town of Żejtun, in an area referred to by locals as ir-raħal t'isfel, or the lower village. While the exact date the villa was built is unknown, historians surmise it was built in the early seventeenth century when Cagliares was already a bishop. This is based on a date found on a doorway, which shows that the building was under construction around 1620. The areas around Żejtun were still subject to intermittent raids and attacks. The closeness of the area to the coast may have contributed to the villa's austere appearance. The ground floor had few windows and openings, and the ones in place acted as musket slits. On the upper part, the façade has a coat of arms - belonging to the Testaferrata family - carved in stone. A similar coat of arms is carved on a fountain in the main garden of the villa. Over time, the villa changed ownership and passed to the Testaferrata family, who oversaw the enlargement of the building.

This austere character means the building lacks the architectural elegance of noblemen's palaces. The villa was enlarged in the eighteenth century with the building of a number of structures at both ground and first floor level. The most important addition was a chapel, complete with dome and lantern. The chapel was dedicated to the Immaculate Conception. It may have been designed by Andrea Belli, as it is similar in style to other works by this architect. If not for the chapel's dome, surmounted by balustrades, the villa would be easily mistaken for a rustic farmhouse. This first floor contains a typical piano nobile with three-centred arches and large rooms with high ceilings.

Vella (1927) also referred to another coat of arms belonging to Bishop Cagliares. This was to be found on a door leading to the villa's courtyard. However, at some point in time, this family crest disappeared or was lost. The first floor has a number of large windows - contrasting with the lack of openings at ground floor level. Vella also describes the inside of the building, which by his time had long since been abandoned: "There are a number of large rooms in this villa, a chapel which is decorated with stone carvings (serving as a fodder store) and a number of prison cells."

== Later history and restoration ==
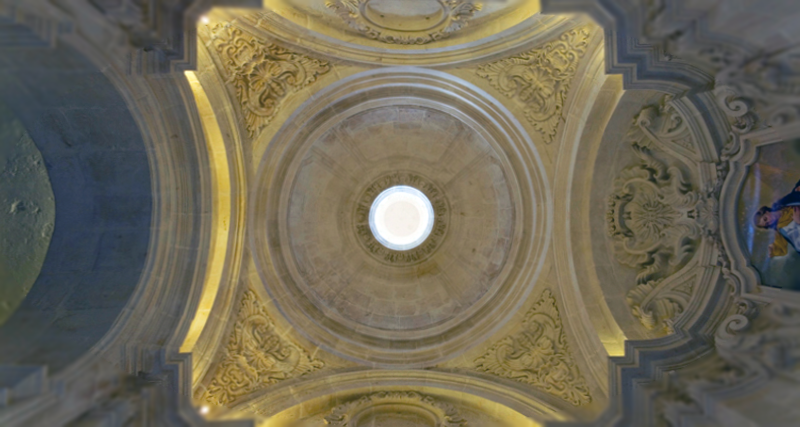
The restored chapel dome of Villa Cagliares.

By 2000, the country villa was in a state of advanced disrepair. The building was in a state of collapse, and was used as a farmhouse. The baroque front court was overrun with chickens, a donkey and goats, as were other rooms downstairs. Access to the higher floors was limited by a single external staircase. All windows were shuttered. Two large arched rooms upstairs had partly collapsed, with buckled floors and the baroque chapel still used as a store for hay. The present owners found the chapel in exactly the same condition as described by Vella in the 1920s. The building had been partly abandoned for many years without being repaired: most of the walls were buckling outwards, timber beams were rotten and stone ceiling slabs (xorok) had either fallen or cracked through.

The villa was restored between 2001 and 2005. The four year project included the complete restoration of the structure, as well as external landscaping works. The restoration consolidated the existing fabric of the building, led to the dismantling and rebuilding of an unstable wing of the villa, the construction of an internal staircase and the modernisation of the building for modern living purposes. As the fundamental guiding principle of the restoration project was to retain the original character of the building, only one new aperture was added at ground floor level. The Testaferrata family crest on the main façade was restored, while a new Cagliares family coat of arms - mentioned by Vella (1927) - was commissioned and reinstated on the main door to the courtyard. The interior of the dome, chapel sculptures and carvings were also restored. The current owners sometimes grant access to the villa for cultural and historical tours by local cultural organisations.

== Gallery ==
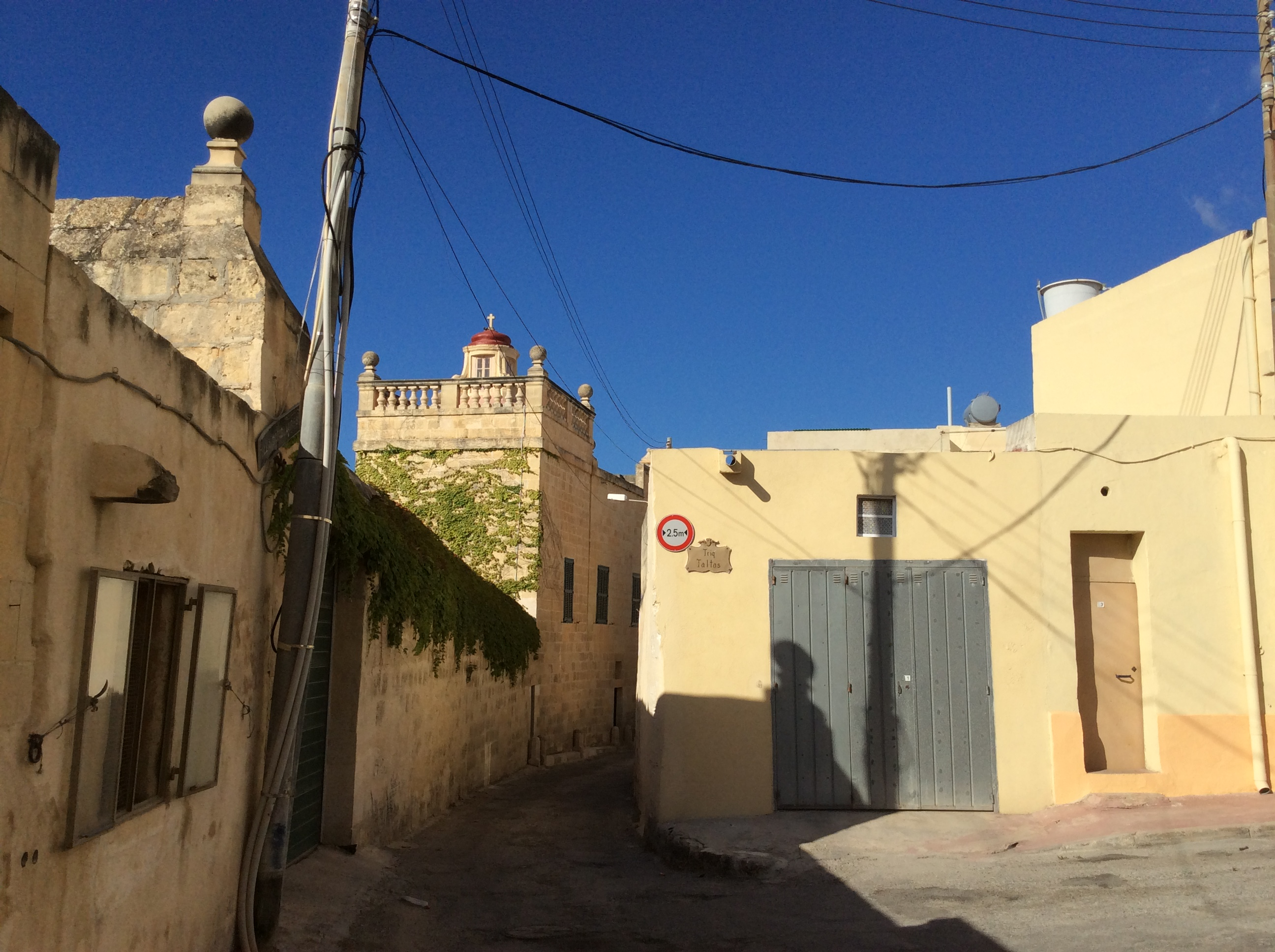
Main approach to the Villa.

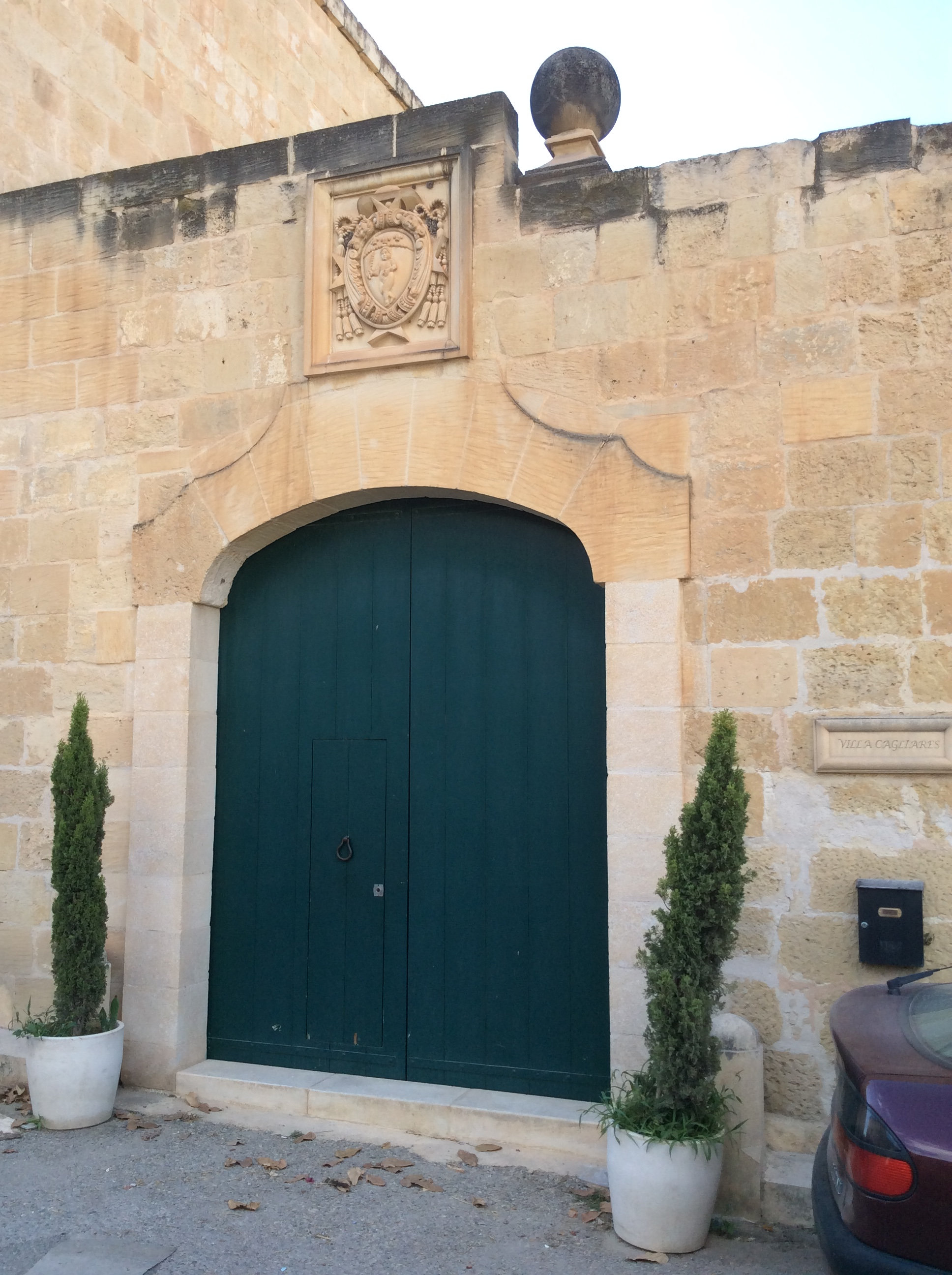
Cagliares coat-of-arms above courtyard entrance.

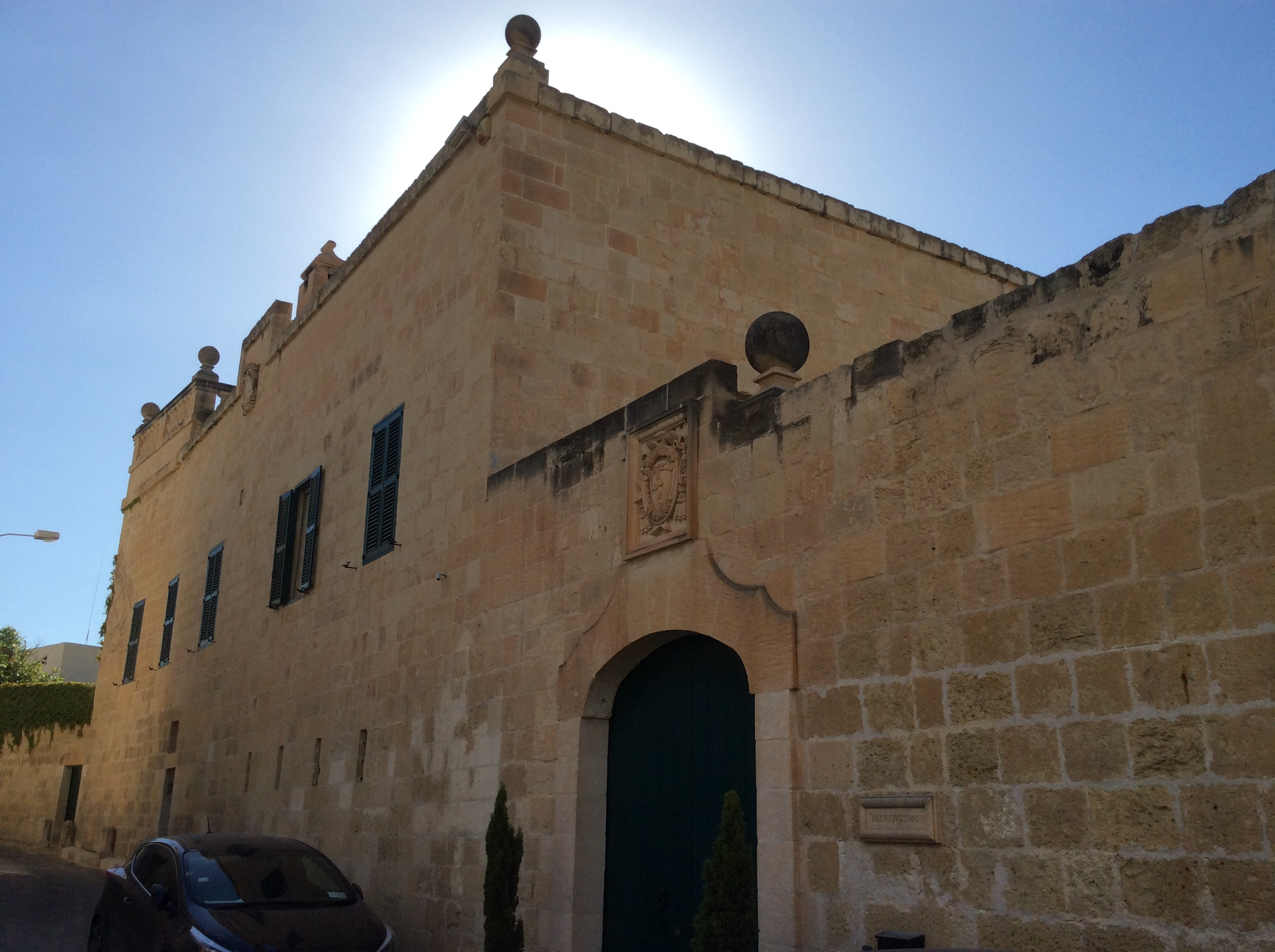
The Mannerist building.
