= Palazzo Fremaux =

- Interactive map of the Palazzo Fremaux area
- Alternative names: Palazzo de Fremaux; Villa Fremaux; Villa de Fremaux

General information
- Status: Demolished
- Type: Townhouse
- Location: Żejtun, Malta
- Coordinates: 35°51′23.5″N 14°31′48.9″E
- Named for: Count Formosa de Fremaux
- Completed: 18th century or earlier
- Demolished: 1990–2003

Technical details
- Material: Limestone
- Floor count: 2

Palazzo Fremaux, also known as Palazzo de Fremaux, Villa Fremaux or Villa de Fremaux, was a townhouse in Żejtun, Malta. The building, together with a next door townhouse, was used as a hospital during the French blockade of 1798–1800. Despite being a designated heritage building, it was demolished gradually between 1990 and 2003.

== History ==
Palazzo Fremaux was a townhouse surrounded by extensive gardens, which belonged to Count Agostino Formosa de Fremaux, a Maltese nobleman who was the Dutch Consulate, and who supported the Jacobins and the French occupation of Malta. Following the outbreak of the Maltese uprising against French rule in June 1798, Żejtun became an important headquarters for the Maltese insurgents and their British allies.

The British tasked Michele Cachia, one of the Maltese leaders, with finding a large building in Żejtun to serve as a hospital for wounded British troops. No single building was large enough to house a hospital for wounded British, Maltese and Neapolitan soldiers, so four sites were chosen. These were Palazzo Fremaux and its next door townhouse, the old church of St. Gregory, a villa belonging to Bishop Vincenzo Labini and another villa which also belonged to the Count de Fremaux (now known as Villa Arrigo).

The occupiers of Palazzo Fremaux damaged parts of the building throughout its use as a hospital, and some interior walls probably had to be demolished in order to enlarge rooms into hospital wards. After the blockade was over, Palazzo Fremaux was probably left unoccupied for some time. The building was later divided into several houses, being extensively modified in the process. It was included on the Antiquities List of 1925.

=== Demolition ===
In June 1990, an application to demolish the building and replace it with a maisonette and forty-four garages was submitted to the Planning Areas Permits Board. The permit was granted, and demolition began before it was stopped in early 1991 on the orders of the Museums Department.

Applications to renew the permit were made in 1992 and 1993, and an agreement to continue the demolition while preserving the façade was made in July 1993. In late 1994, the building was scheduled as a Grade 2 property, meaning that the interior could be altered or demolished but the façade must be kept intact.

An application to construct thirty-eight garages and twenty-five dwellings while retaining the façade was granted in 1998. An application to demolish the façade was made in 2001, but it was rejected according to the Grade 2 scheduling.

The Antiquities List ceased to have effect according to the Heritage Act of 2002. That year, the applicant asked for a reconsideration, and Minister of Education and Culture Louis Galea overruled the Director of Museums' recommendation to retain the façade. On 10 December the Development Control Commission approved the application, although this was against the Planning Directorate's recommendation. The façade was pulled down on 20 January 2003.

The demolition was opposed by local residents, and it was condemned by the Żejtun Local Council and the NGO Fondazzjoni Wirt Artna. Labour MP Evarist Bartolo formally called for the resignation of Louis Galea due to his backing of the façade's demolition.
