= Our Saviour's Chapel, Żejtun =

Our Saviour's Chapel
- The Chapel of the Transfiguration of Jesus
- Kappella tas-Salvatur
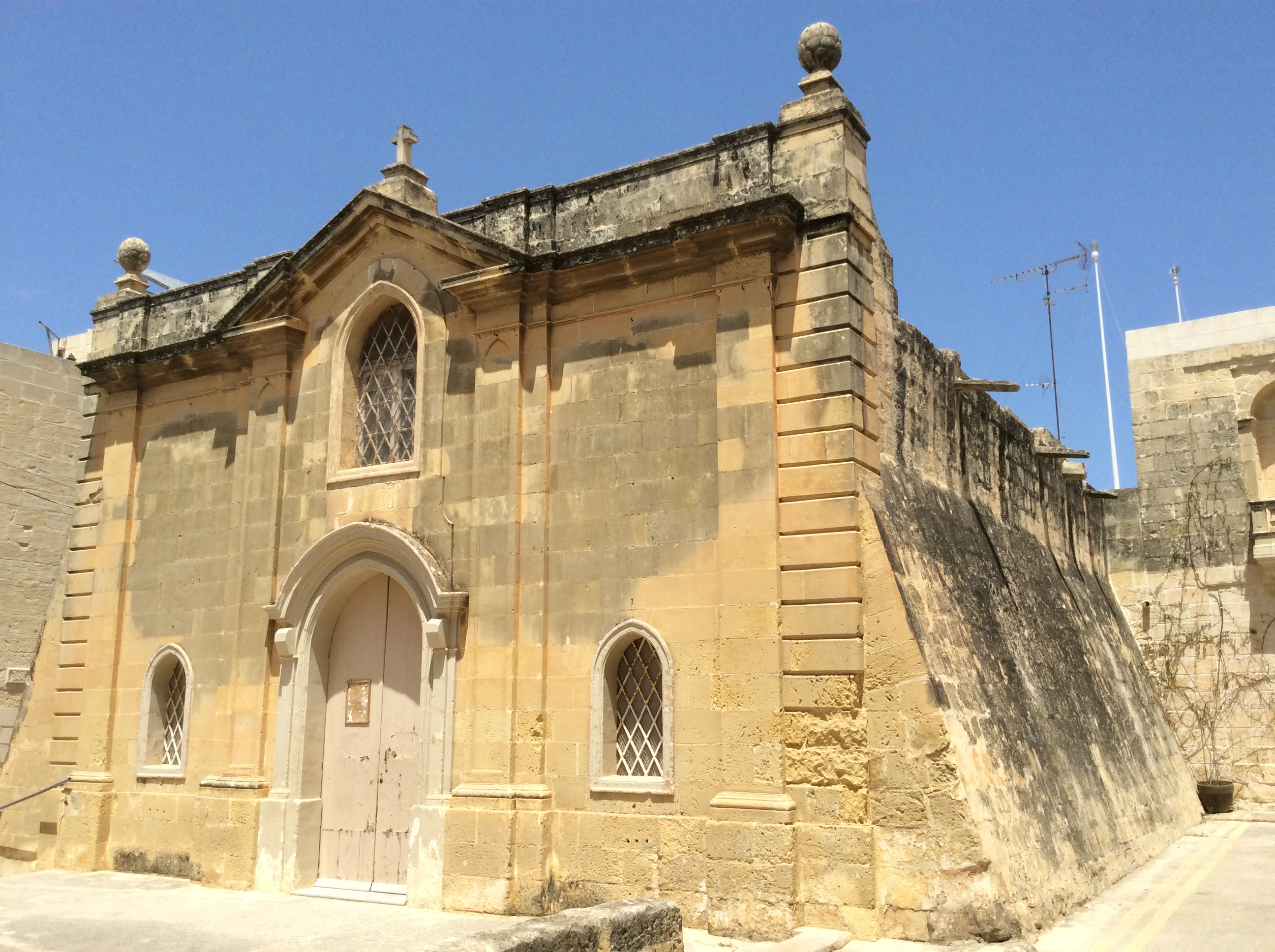

- Location within Malta
- 35°51′25.3″N 14°32′04.0″E
- Location: Żejtun
- Country: Malta
- Denomination: Roman Catholic

History
- Founded: 1500
- Dedication: Transfiguration of Jesus

Administration
- Archdiocese: Malta

Our Saviour's formally known as The Church of the Transfiguration of Jesus, popularly known in Maltese as Is-Salvatur is a Roman Catholic church located in the village of Żejtun, in Malta.

== Origin ==
During the middle ages, Żejtun was divided in various small hamlets. Our Saviour's was located in what was then known as Bisqallin. As the parish church of St Catherine was located at a much further distance, these small hamlets had small chapels which they could use to avoid walking the long distance to the parish church. Bisqallin had two chapels, one dedicated to the Visitation and the other to Our Saviour both built around 1500 and both built beside each other. Both chapels are mentioned in inquisitor Pietro Dusina's report of 1575. However Dusina reports that Our Saviour's lacked all necessarily items to use for religious services. He even mentions that the chapel did not have a door. Consequently he ordered that a door be installed.

== New chapel ==
During the 18th century, Our Saviour's was in need of great renovation and thus it was decided to combine both chapels into one. Our Saviour's was demolished and a new one built combining with the medieval chapel of the Visitation which was then turned into the sacristy. Thus Our Saviour's has an 18th century front and a medieval back side. The chapel's facade was rebuilt in the 20th century in a neo-gothic style.

== Interior ==
The chapel has a stone altar and a painting depicting the Transfiguration of Jesus, the work of Toussaints Busuttil. Other paintings depict the Visitation of Mary to her cousin Elizabeth and another depicting Saint Anne, the former commemorating the medieval chapel of the Visitation.

== See also ==
- Culture of Malta
- History of Malta
- List of Churches in Malta
- Religion in Malta
