= Żejtun dialect =

Dialect of Maltese

- Żejtuni dialect
- Żejtewni
- Region: Żejtun and surrounding area
- Native speakers: About 12,000 (2020)
- Language family: Afro-Asiatic: Semitic; West Semitic; Central Semitic; Arabic; Maghrebi Arabic; Pre-Hilalian; Sicilian Arabic; Maltese; Żejtun dialect
- Writing system: Maltese alphabet

Language codes
- ISO 639-3: –
- IETF: mt-u-sd-mt67
- Żejtun in Malta

One of the dialects of the Maltese language is the Żejtun dialect (Standard Maltese: Djalett taż-Żejtun or Żejtuni; Żejtun Maltese: Żejtewni). This dialect is used by many of the inhabitants of Żejtun and in other settlements around this city such as Marsaxlokk, and spoken by about 12,000 people.

The following three words are examples; there are many more that make it into the list of vocabulary found in this dialect.

- For 'kite' the Standard Maltese word is tajra, but in this dialect it is found as manuċċa.
- For 'foggy weather' the Standard Maltese word is ċpar, but in this dialect it is found as ċlambu.
- For 'slingshot' the Standard Maltese word is żbandola, but in this dialect it is found as steringa.

All the vocal letters in this dialect possess a liquid versatility which allows the position, emphasis and tone of the vowels to change without any distinct rule; in some words the consonant letters are found to change as well. Such variations in the dialect are innate to native speakers.

== Phonology ==
=== The vowel A ===
The vowel a in the Żejtun dialect changes into /u/ or /e/. For example:

English	Maltese	Żejtun dialect
newspaper	gazzetta	gezzette
meat	laħam	leħem
fat	xaħam	xeħem
coal	faħam	feħem
water	ilma	ilme
burner	spiritiera	spiritiere
home	dar	dur

This change happens to roughly all of the words that end in the vowel a, but when the syllable structure does not allow the vowel a to change into e, such as in the Maltese equivalent of potato, i.e. patata, a different vowel has to be used to elongate the syllable. Here, the word does not become petete but changes into û, becoming patûta.

=== The vowel E ===
The vowel e changes into the vowels /a/ or also /i/. For example:

English	Maltese	Żejtun dialect
wild	selvaġġ	salvaġġ
seriousness	serjetà	sirjitu
seminary	seminarju	siminurju
when	meta	mite

=== The vowel O ===
The vowel o in this dialect changes into u, however it demands an element of phonetical emphasis to differentiate this changed u from the previous one. In philology such emphasis requires an accent, hence it is notated as ù. Example:

English	Maltese	Żejtun dialect
school	skola	skùla
wheel	rota	rùta
pan	borma	bùrma
sack	xkora	xkùra
corner	rokna	rùkna
roll	romblu	rùmblu

This change occurs in many other words that have o as their first vowel.

=== The vowel U ===
When the last vowel of the word is u, it changes into the diphthong /ow/. Sometimes the u is changed into ew. Example:

English	Maltese	Żejtun dialect
ship	vapur	vapowr
Mr.	sinjur	sinjowr
stick	bastun	bastown
vase	vażun	vażown
money	flus	flews
fish	ħut	ħewt
shop	ħanut	ħenewt
