= Chapel of St Mary of Ħal Tmin =

Chapel of Saint Mary of Ħal Tmin
- Chapel of the Assumption of the Virgin Mary of Ħal Tmin
- Kappella ta' Santa Marija ta' Ħal Tmin
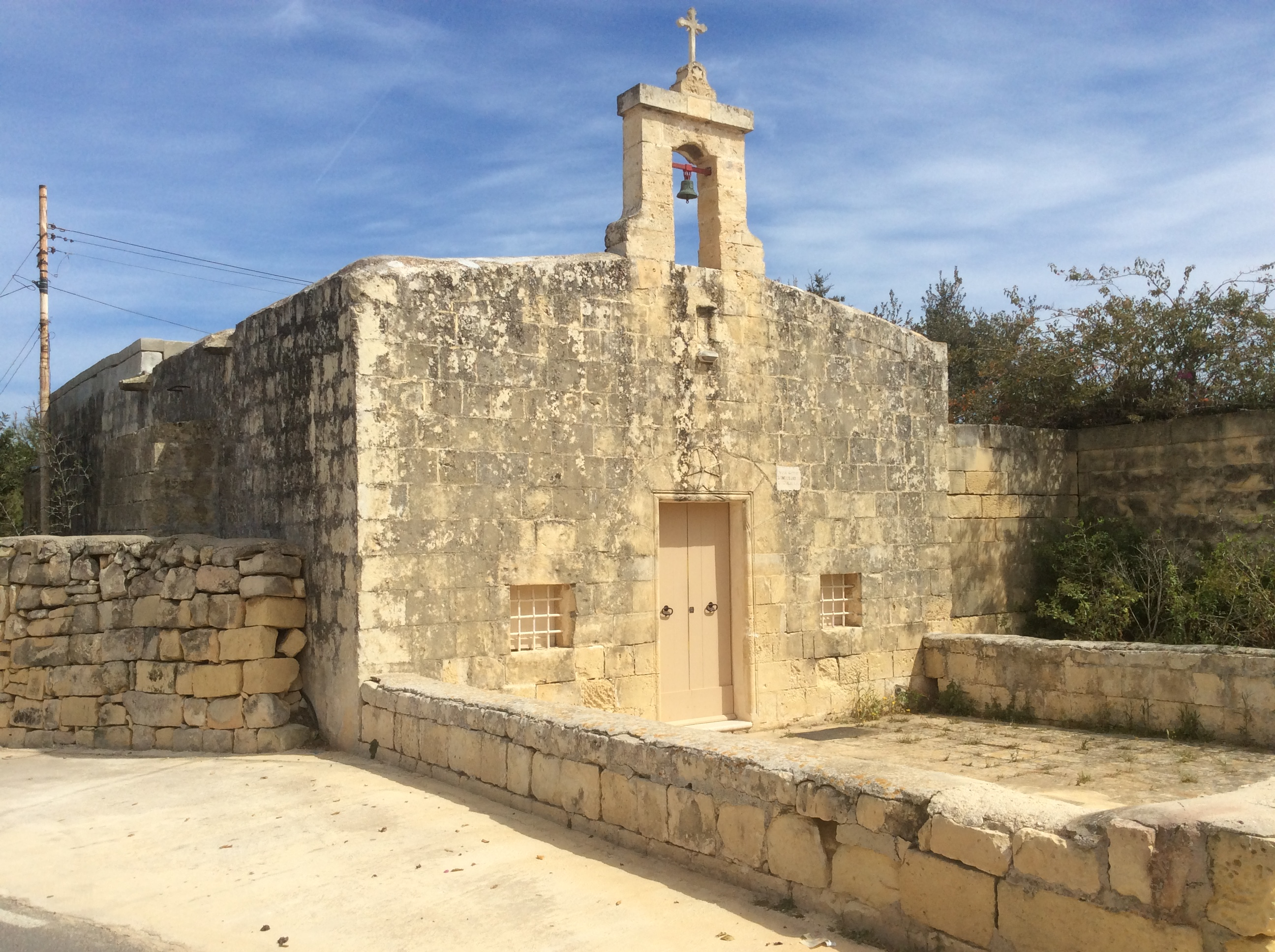
- Chapel of Saint Mary of Ħal Tmin
- 35°51′21″N 14°32′56″E
- Location: Żejtun
- Country: Malta
- Denomination: Roman Catholic

History
- Status: Active
- Founded: 1597
- Founder: Leonardo Tabone
- Dedication: Assumption of Mary

Architecture
- Functional status: Church

Administration
- Archdiocese: Malta

Clergy
- Archbishop: Charles Scicluna

The Chapel of Saint Mary of Ħal Tmin (Maltese: Santa Marija ta' Ħal Tmin) is a Roman Catholic 16th century chapel located in the outskirts of the village of Żejtun in Malta. Today the church remains in very good condition, with the teaching of catechism classes and other forms of religious activities and meetings organised in it. The chapel building is placed on the list of National Inventory of the Cultural Property of the Maltese Islands.

== History ==
The chapel stands in the area known as Ħal Tmin, on the road running from the old church of Saint Catherine (San Girgor) to Saint Thomas' Bay. It was built in 1597 by Leonardo Tabone, an influential member of a family who had long settled in this area. The chapel was dedicated to the Assumption of the Mother of God.

The year of the chapel's foundation is engraved on a limestone block along with a Maltese cross, placed above the doorway of the chapel. The chapel is not believed to have existed prior to 1575, as it was not mentioned in that year's report of the papal visitor Pietro Dusina.

Holy mass was celebrated in the chapel with vespers in the evening, on the feast of the Assumption, of Saint Catherine of Alexandria and Saint Leonard. Mass was also celebrated on every other feast relating to Saint Mary. A visit by Bishop Balaguer Camarasa in 1659 confirms that on the patronal feast of the chapel, three holy masses were celebrated.

The church served the villagers for many years. Masses were held each Sundays, and in October, the month of the Holy Rosary, daily rosary service were also held. During the Lenten period, a retreat took place in the chapel, while catechism classes was taught throughout the year. Over time, along with the depopulation of Ħal Tmin, most of these activities were discontinued. During World War II, the rear part of the chapel was damaged in an air raid.

=== Legacy ===
Leonardo Tabone left a legacy with notary Andrea Albano, with the purpose of providing a dowry to a poor maiden annually. The legacy, instituted on August 20, 1625 (other sources give the date September 12, 1628 or 1629), amounted to 54 gold coins representing the annual income from a lease of three of the Tabone family's fields. This income was to provide the dowry for one poor maiden, alternating annually from Birgu, where Leonardo's wife came from, and Żejtun, where the Tabone family resided.

According to the Leonardo Tabone, the bride from Birgu was to be chosen by the members of the Rosary Brotherhood from the Dominican Church in Birgu, and she would receive the sacrament of marriage in front of the altar of Our Lady of the Rosary. The bride from Żejtun should be chosen by the council of the parish, and would be married on August 15, on the feast of the Assumption, in the chapel of Ħal Tmin. For twelve days preceding the ceremony, she was to pray for the Tabone family. Some time later, Tabone enlarged the legacy, allowing two brides to be chosen annually.

== Architecture ==
The chapel is typical of the late sixteenth century, with a squarish layout, a simple façade and a flat, slightly gabled roof. The chapel is accessible through a small, rectangular parvis, surrounded by a low wall. Its facade is characterised by a simple rectangular entrance, on both sides of which there are low square, barred windows. The windows served for private adoration while the chapel was closed. The façade is topped by a belfry with a small bell, and a cross on top.

=== Interior ===
Originally, the chapel was rectangular, with a roof of longitudinal stone slabs (xorok) supported by three Norman arches, supported by the walls of the building. The rear part of the roof was damaged during World War II, and was hurriedly repaired with concrete. The third arch was demolished, and replaced by one in modern stone. A small sacristy was added to the back as well as, in the part of the garden, a room for parish meetings.

The titular image shows Saint Mary carried by angels to heaven.
