= Chapel of St Nicholas, Żejtun =

Chapel of St Nicholas
- The Chapel of Saint Nicholas
- Kappella ta' San Nikola; Kappella ta' San Niklaw
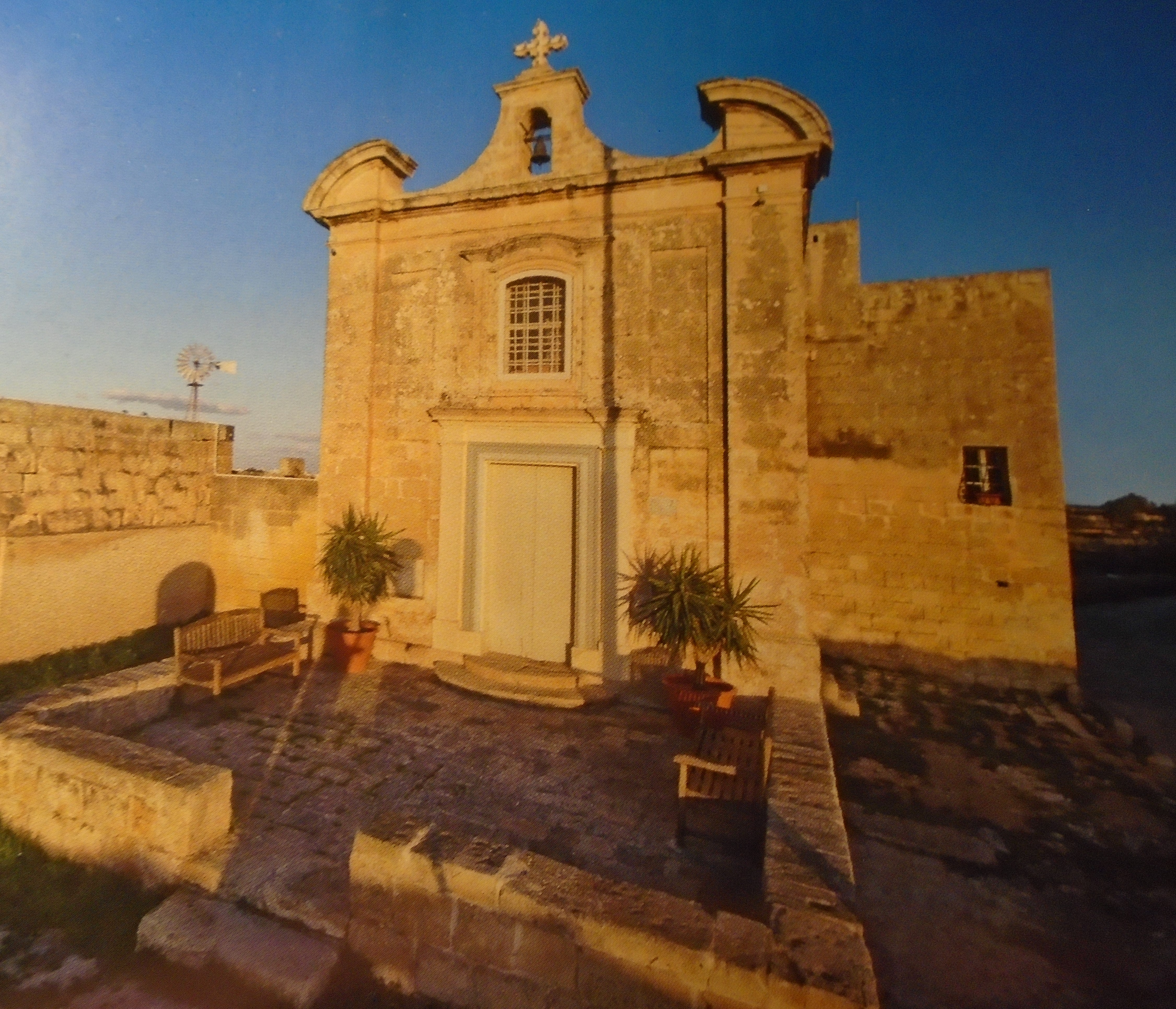

- 35°50′55.6″N 14°32′50.9″E
- Location: Żejtun
- Country: Malta
- Denomination: Roman Catholic

History
- Dedication: Saint Nicholas

Administration
- Archdiocese: Malta

The Chapel of St Nicholas also referred to as the Chapel of San Niklaw is a 17th-century chapel located in the outskirts of Żejtun, in an area referred to as Ħal-Ġinwi in Malta.

== History ==
The cult of Saint Nicholas was probably introduced in Malta by devotees from Sicily during the Middle Ages. The area were the chapel arises was originally known as Il-Kasar, although by 1500 it was already known as San Niklaw. Some records mention that the chapel was built in 1504.

Reference to this chapel is made by inquisitor Pietro Dusina during his apostolic visit to Malta in 1575. The 1575 report mentions that the feast of St Nicholas was celebrated with vespers and mass and that the chapel fell under the jurisdiction of the parish of Żejtun. The chapel served the people living in small hamlets, now disappeared, which existed in the chapel's vicinity.

The present chapel was built in 1640, reflecting 17th century architecture. Nowadays the chapel is part of the privately owned San Niklaw Estate which cares for the chapel and celebrates the annual feast of St Nicholas on December 6.
