= Ħajt il-Wied =

Zone in Żejtun, Malta

Coordinates: 35°51′46″N 14°32′02″E

Ħajt il-Wied, is a zone in the north of Żejtun, Malta. Wied Mazza (Mazza Valley), separates Żejtun from Żabbar and Marsaskala.

Hunting is permitted in this area.

== Climate ==
The rainy water of Żejtun first goes to this valley, before it runs into the sea. The southern part is known as "Ħajt il-Wied", meaning wall of the valley.

== Architecture ==
Many medieval buildings located here date to the Norman period.
