= Żejtun =

City in the Southern Region of Malta

Żejtun Iż-Żejtun Città Beland, Casale Santa Caterina; Bisqallin; Casal Bisbut
- Local council
- Iż-Żejtun
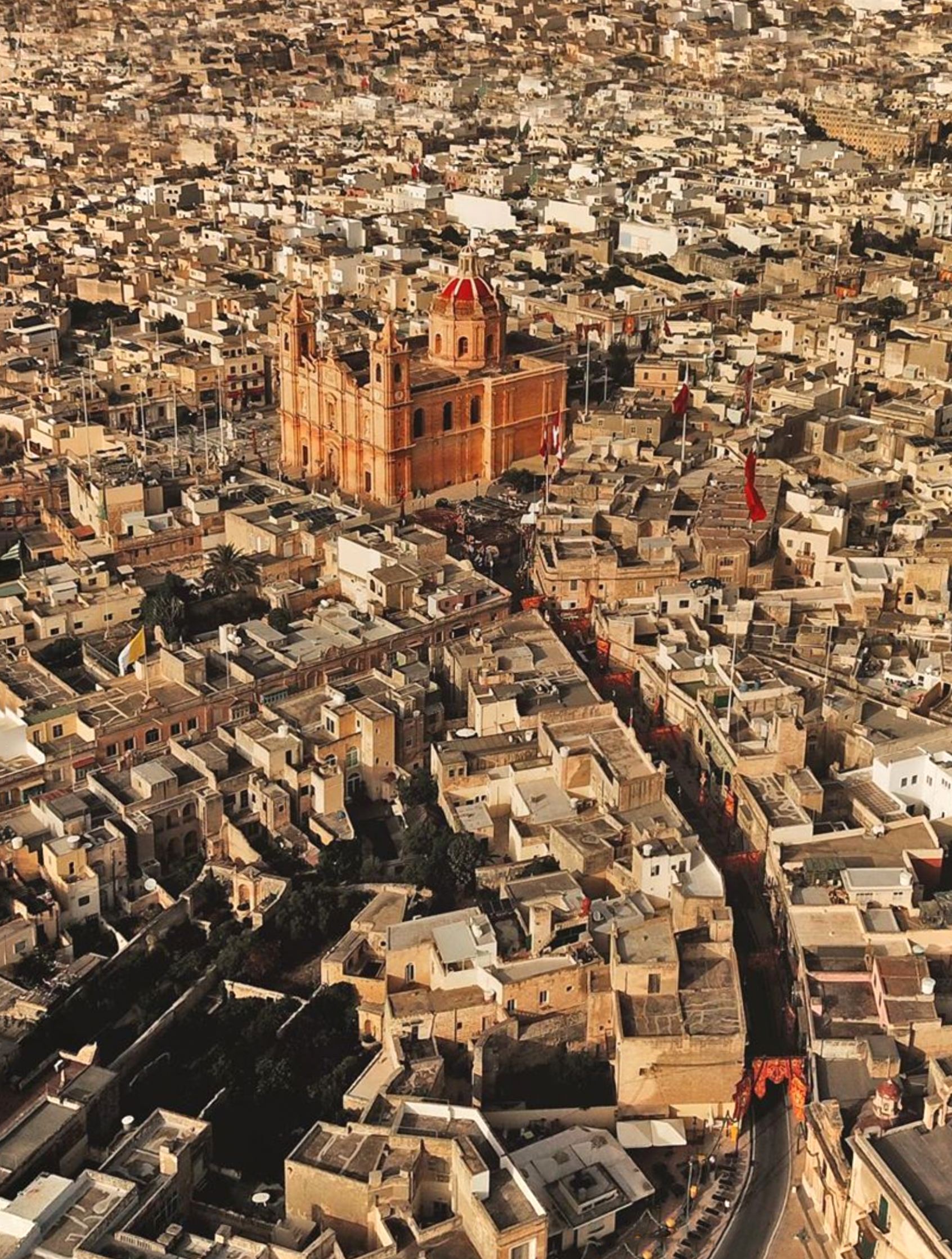
- Aerial view of Żejtun with the parish church at the centre

- Flag Coat of arms
- Motto: Palladis clara munera
- Interactive map of Żejtun
- Coordinates: 35°51′20″N 14°32′0″E
- Country: Malta
- Region: Southern Region
- District: South Eastern District
- Borders: Fgura, Għaxaq, Marsaskala, Marsaxlokk, Santa Luċija, Tarxien, Żabbar

Government
  - Mayor: Joan Agius (PL)

Area
  - Total: 7.4 km^{2} (2.9 sq mi)
- Elevation: 60 m (200 ft)

Population (Jul. 2024)
  - Total: 12,783
  - Density: 1,700/km^{2} (4,500/sq mi)
- Demonym(s): Żejtuni (m), Żejtunija (f), Żwieten (pl)
- Time zone: UTC+1 (CET)
  - Summer (DST): UTC+2 (CEST)
- Postal code: ZTN
- Dialing code: 356
- ISO 3166 code: MT-67
- Patron saint: St. Catherine of Alexandria
- Day of festa: Third week of June / 25 November
- Website: Official website

Żejtun (Maltese: Iż-Żejtun [ɪzːɛɪ̯ˈtuːn]) is a city in the Southern Region of Malta. Żejtun is traditionally known as Città Beland, a title conferred by the grandmaster of the Order of the Knights of Malta, Ferdinand von Hompesch zu Bolheim in 1797. Before that, the village was known as Casale Santa Caterina, named after its patron saint and parish titular.

The population of Żejtun was 12,783 in July 2024. This included 6,541 males and 6,242 females; 11,732 Maltese nationals and 1,051 foreign nationals.

The old urban cores, called Bisqallin and Ħal Bisbut, largely retain their narrow medieval streets and ancient boundaries. Since at least the 19th century, the name Żejtun, or Casale Zeitoun, has referred to the settlement which developed around these two core villages. Together with a number of small hamlets in the vicinity, the bulk of the conurbation forms the city of Żejtun, administered by the Żejtun Local Council. Over successive centuries, Żejtun lost to urbanisation a number of villages and hamlets that used to form part of its territory, which originally covered most of the south eastern part of Malta. The city experienced extensive urbanisation over the 1970s and 1980s, with the completion of numerous infrastructural and urban projects designed to relieve housing pressure in the neighbouring Three Cities area leading to a significant increase of the town's population. The town and its surrounding satellite villages are said to typify the basic Maltese conception of village life.

Żejtun is a major centre on the islands, with a significant contribution to the islands' history, arts and commerce. One of the country's principal industrial estates, Bulebel, can be found on the city's borders. Żejtun contains a number of important heritage sites, such as St Catherine's Parish Church, St Catherine's Old Church – known as St Gregory's, numerous votive chapels, and the remains of a Roman villa. The parish of Żejtun is one of the oldest on the islands and already existed in 1436. The original parish church was built in the 12th century, and rebuilt in 1492. The current mayor is Doris Abela. The archpriest is Fr Nicholas Pace.

== Toponymy ==
The etymology of Żejtun has been studied over the ages. It takes its name from the Sicilian Arabic for olive – zaytun (Arabic: الزيتون) – one of the ancient agronomic industries on Malta. This was confirmed by Ciantar, who stated that "...the town was very pleasant, due to the great quantity of olive groves, from whence it got and still retains the name Zeitun, which means olive; there is also the tradition that olive oil in abundant quantity used to be made here." (Note: (in Italian) "Questa contrada (Żejtun) era molto amena per la gran quantità di oliveti che vi verdeggiano; onde trasse, ed ancora conserva, il nome di Zeitun, che significa olive; essendovi anche tradizione, che vi si facesse dell'olio in abbondanza.") While the Sicilian Arabic word zaytun refers to the fruit of the tree, the olive tree itself is called zabbūğ or zanbūğ.

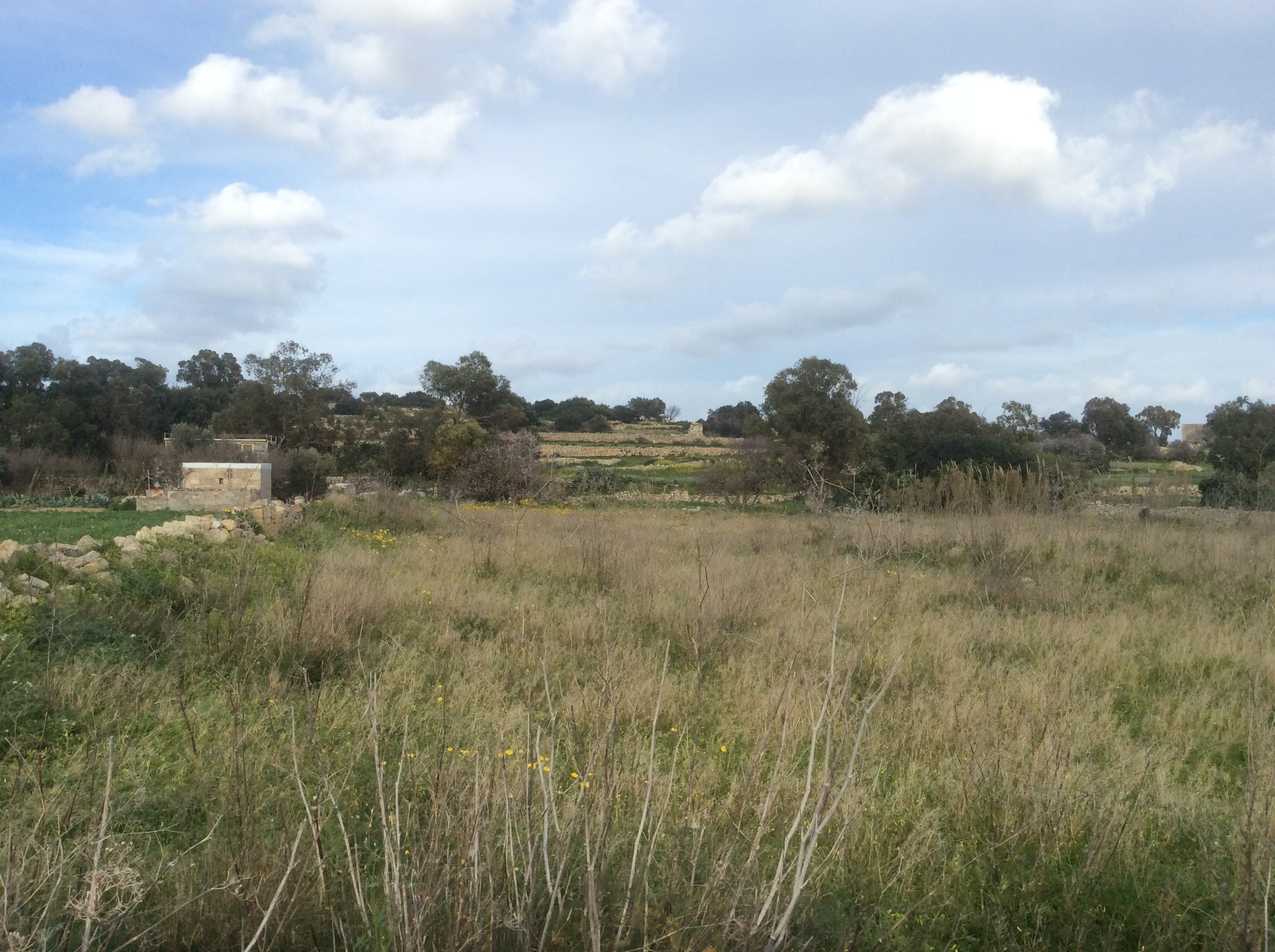
Farmland in Żejtun.

The Arabic origin of the town's name was again recorded in the first Maltese language dictionary as "Żejtun, in the eastern part of the island of Malta, there is a large, rich and thriving town with this name, which incorporates another area called Bisqallin, and the village of Bisbut. In the Saracen era, there must have been olive groves here, for the area to retain its true name." (Note: (in Italian) "Zejtun, con questo nome vi e’ all’oriente di Malta una terra grande, ricca e trafficante, che comprende ancora la terra detta Bisqallin, ed il villaggio Bisbut. Al tempo dei Saraceni vi dovevano essere degl’oliveti di cui conserva il vero nome.")

In his commentary on Maltese history, Gio. Francesco Abela claimed that the eastern half of Malta, from the old city to the coast was often divided into two further halves. To the east, all the land was called Zeitun, while to the other side - that is, from Marsamxett to all the old territory of the Birkirkara parish - the land was called Araar. Abela claims to have seen this notation in plans drawn by Girolamo Cassar, and that these two contrade were covered with the two respective trees.

The name Żejtun was used to refer to the general south eastern region of Malta. In 1372, for example, King Frederick of Sicily granted fiefs in contrata de lu Zeituni, and again in 1373 in contrata de Lu Zayduni. The use of the name Żejtun for the urban core and town, as used today, does not go back further than the mid-17th century. In population censuses taken by the Order, reference is always made to the parish or chapel of St. Catherine. The name Żejtun began to refer to the town, instead of a district or contrada, by the 1650s.

Over the centuries, the region of Żejtun included a number of smaller settlements and villages. Casale Santa Caterina, Ħal Bisbut, Ħal Ġwann, and Bisqallin were used interchangeably to refer to both specific areas, or to the whole settlement. The name Bisqallin, which is the name of the lower part of the city, is traditionally linked with the arrival of Sicilian settlers, however this claim is contested by modern historians who link it with the diminutive form for Ħal Baskal or Baskal iż-Żgħir. Over time, the name was also corrupted into the Italian Casal Pasqualino.

Żejtun shares its name with a number of settlements and areas in Greece, North Africa and the Near East. Today, Bisqallin (Biskallin) is known as ir-raħal t'isfel, the 'lower village', while Ħal Bisbut is referred to as ir-raħal ta' fuq, the 'upper village.' The historic motto of the city of Żejtun is Palladis clara munera, indicating the town's position on a hill gifted it with clear and commanding views over the south eastern part of Malta. The motto according to the Żejtun Local Council is Frott iż-Żebbuġ Ismi, meaning that the city derives its name from the fruit of the olive tree.

== Topography ==
The core of Żejtun is located on a hill, rising 60 metres (197 feet) above sea level. The promontory is marked to the north by Wied iz-Ziju, which separates Żejtun from Tarxien and the outlying high ground. Another valley, Wied iż-Żring, is partly obscured by the Bulebel industrial zone, and an old road which links Tarxien to Żejtun, as well as by the widened arterial road of Tal-Barrani. The valley meanders until it reaches the harbour of Marsascala. To the south, the Żejtun promontory is bounded by a gentle slope which then forms the greater port area of Marsaxlokk. The higher ridge of Żejtun is marked by the late medieval chapel of Saint Catherine of Alexandria, known as Saint Gregory's Church, and the important crossroads of Bir id-Deheb. The Ħal Tmin district lies on the eastern outskirts of the village, and is known for the Chapel of St Mary of Ħal Tmin.

Żejtun is surrounded on all sides by the rural areas of Għaxaq, Marsaxlokk, Żabbar and Marsascala, with a distinct gap existing between Żejtun and the other localities, except in Bir id-Deheb.

== History ==
=== Prehistory and antiquity ===
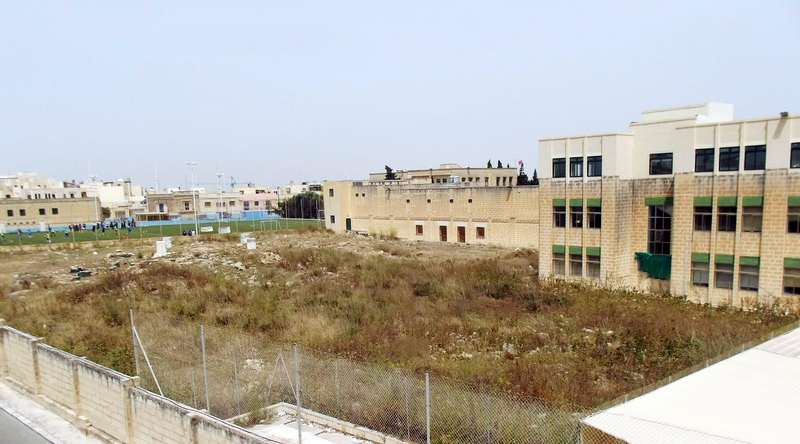
The Roman villa complex in Żejtun.

Żejtun is strategically located between three important ancient harbours, that of Marsa to the north, and those of Marsaxlokk and Marsascala to the south. The area was occupied since prehistory. Late Neolithic remains were found near the megaliths of Ħal Ġinwi, as well as the megalithic remains at Tas-Silġ, found on a hillock between Żejtun and Marsaxlokk. Remains of the temple at Ħal Ġinwi were found in the vicinity of San Niklaw chapel, between Żejtun and the Tas-Silġ temple. The site is today represented by a few ashlar blocks still visible in a field wall. More remains may survive beneath the soil, since an excavation in 1917 was superficial. These sites remained in use during the Bronze Age, as well as during later historical periods. Pottery shards possibly carrying the inscribed name of the Phoenician god Ashtart were also found. Other minor remains, now lost, include a menhir towards Marsascala and a stone circle at Bir id-Deheb.

Along the southern edge of Żejtun, excavations led to the discovery of an ancient Roman villa. The remains still contain areas of the original Roman tiling and coloured stucco. The complex was an active settlement since the Bronze Age, although the presently visible remains can be dated from the Punic period right up to Late Antiquity. More evidence of ancient habitation in the area comes from burial grounds, such as those around St Gregory's Church, Tal-Barrani, Tal-Ħotba and Bulebel. The excavation site at the villa confirms the presence of a thriving olive oil industry at the southern end of the islands. Modern historical studies and topology confirm that the area between Żejtun and Marsaxlokk was covered in vegetation and pasture land.

=== Medieval Żejtun ===
With the collapse of Roman rule in the early 5th century, the Roman villa in Żejtun entered a period of long decay. The Christian religion and Byzantine civilisation, however, clung on at Tas-Silġ, with the construction of a three-aisled basilica built atop pagan temples. The basilica remained in use until the Arab invasion of AD 870.

The historian Ibn Hawqal wrote about the invasion of AD 870, describing how the whole islands were depopulated. Modern scholars debate whether the invasion marked an outright "ethnic break and not merely a cultural and religious switch on the Maltese islands." Little is known about Żejtun under Arab rule. Outside Mdina and possibly Birgu, hardly any village existed. However, a number of Late Medieval place-names in the general area of Żejtun, such as Bir id-Deheb, Ħajt il-Wied, Tal-Ħotba and Bulebel il-Kbir serve to highlight the intensity with which the area was used. One such name, il-Minżel, in Bulebel iż-Żgħir, can be translated as 'field at the descent' or the 'field at the house,' with the word manzil meaning a resting place, a place of alighting, settlement or abode. A large number of place-names implies the accessibility of the land, and therefore its use. Hence, the area was extensively used, with the Arabs using the established agroindustrial infrastructure as the basis for their presence in Malta and Gozo.

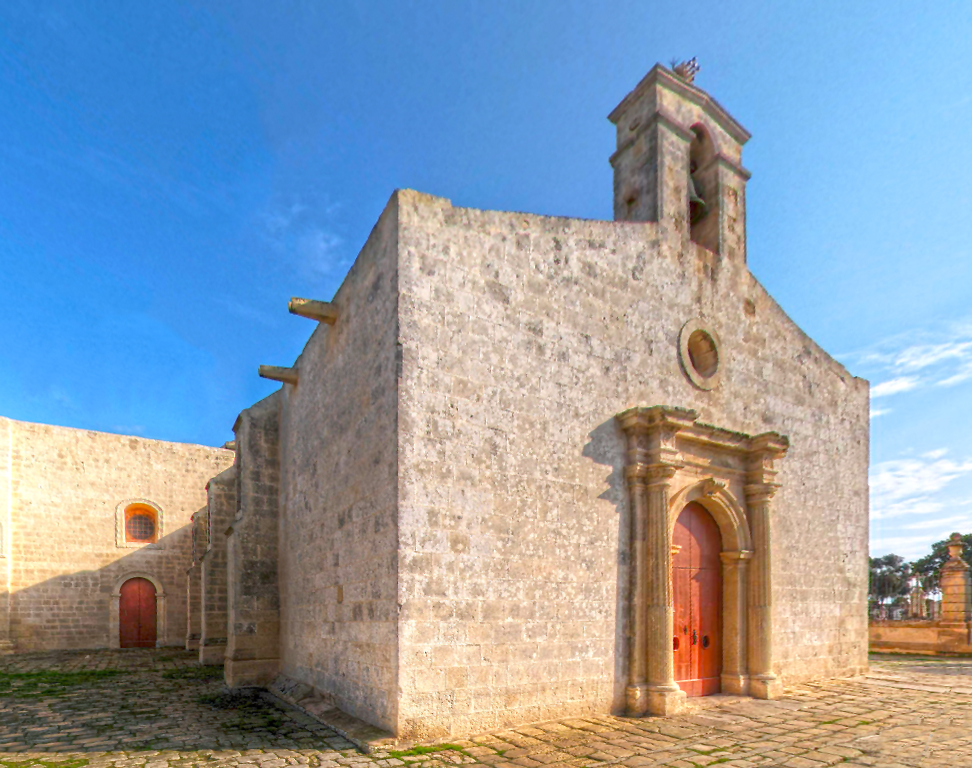
The old Church of Saint Catherine of Alexandria, commonly known as St Gregory's.

With the Norman occupation of 1091 and re-establishment of Latin rule in 1127, a slow re-Christianisation process began with monks from the monastery of Saint Basil arriving to Malta from Sicily and Pantelleria. These were devoted to various saints, particularly Saint George and Saint Catherine of Alexandria. The devotion towards the latter led to the dedication of a number of chapels to the saint. One of these was the Church of Saint Catherine of Bisqallin, now known as Saint Gregory's church. This church was renowned across the islands for its age, being one of the first built in Malta following the end of Saracen rule.

In 1223, Emperor Frederick II, ordered the exile of the entire male population of Celano to Sicily and Malta. An established tradition held in both Żejtun and Celano claims that some of these exiles settled down in Żejtun.

The island's communal organisation in this period pitted the Mdina town-council, or Universitas, against the independent entity centred around the Castrum Maris. Many inhabitants of Birgu, and the neighbouring villages argued that they were not liable to pay taxes to the Mdina town-council, as they fell within Castrum Maris jurisdiction. This was the case with the inhabitants of Żejtun, who refused to pay the taxes due to the Mdina council in 1473. However, as late as 1494, in case of attack the inhabitants of Żejtun were expected to take refuge in Mdina. The villages' lack of defences, and proximity with the sea, made all casali in the south-east of Malta exposed to raids and incursions.

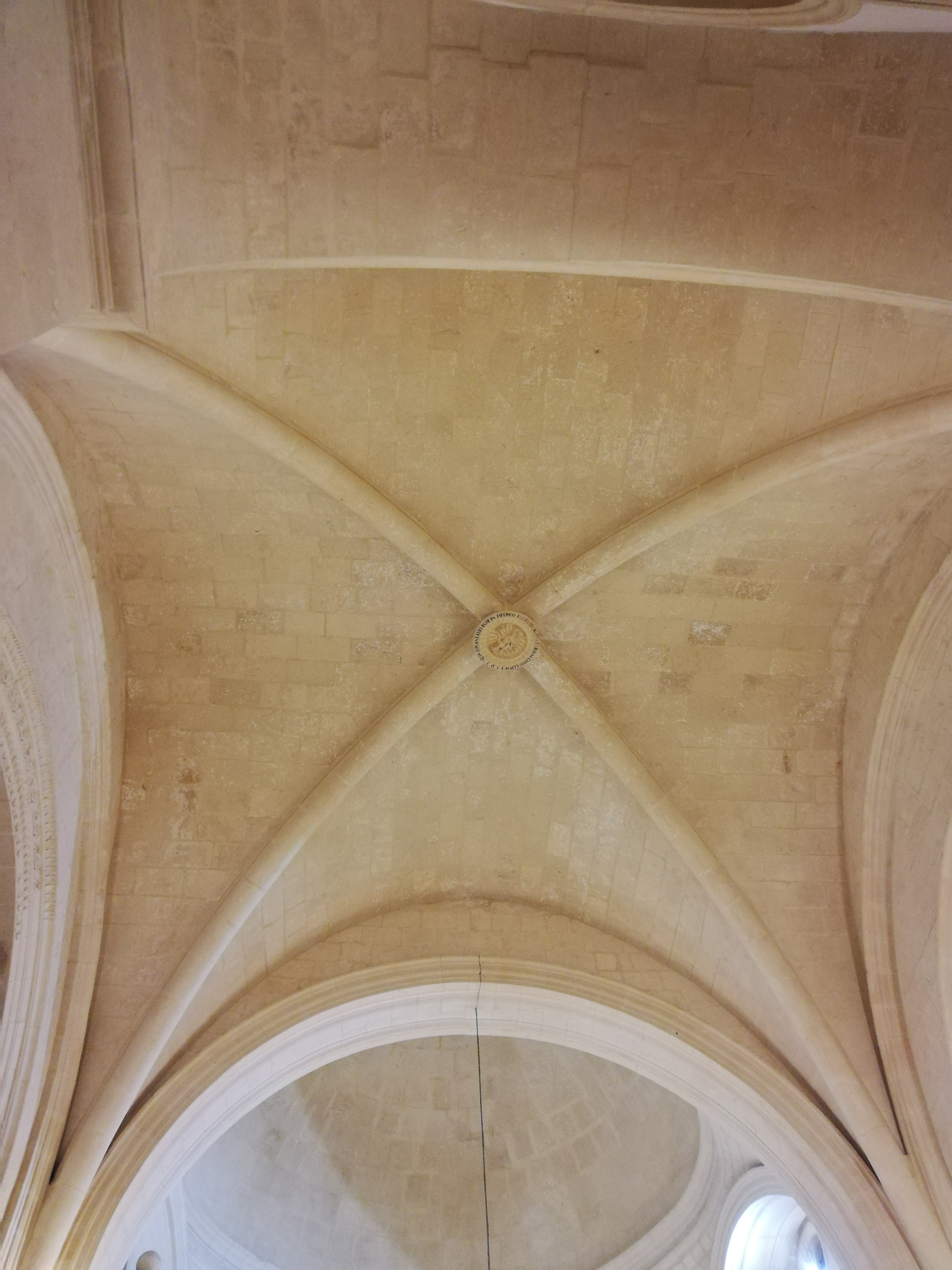
The vault of the northern semitransept of Saint Catherine's Old Church, completed in 1593.

The chapel of St Catherine was already a parish church in 1436 as one of the eight mother churches on Malta. This chapel stood halfway between Bisqallin and Ħal Bisbut, a distance of half a mile from each village. This medieval chapel remained in use until 1492, when it was rebuilt and enlarged to its present state. This was commemorated by an inscription. (Note: (in Latin) Hoc opus fieri fecerunt Venerabilis Czullus dictu Baldu, et honorabiles Paulus Dalli, et Jacobus Bonnici Procuratores S. Catharinae de Zeitun – MCCCCLXXXXII – Ultimo Februarii X indictionis)

The present church was built on the footprint of the old chapel, with the current building's nave now corresponding with the old chapel walls. The chapel was enlarged in 1593 and again in 1603, with the additions of a transept and an altar. With the addition of the transept, this was the first church in Malta to be given the form of a latin cross.

The ruins of a chapel dedicated to St. Leonard, dating back to the 1600s, may still exist in the limits of Żejtun.

==== Feast of Saint Gregory ====
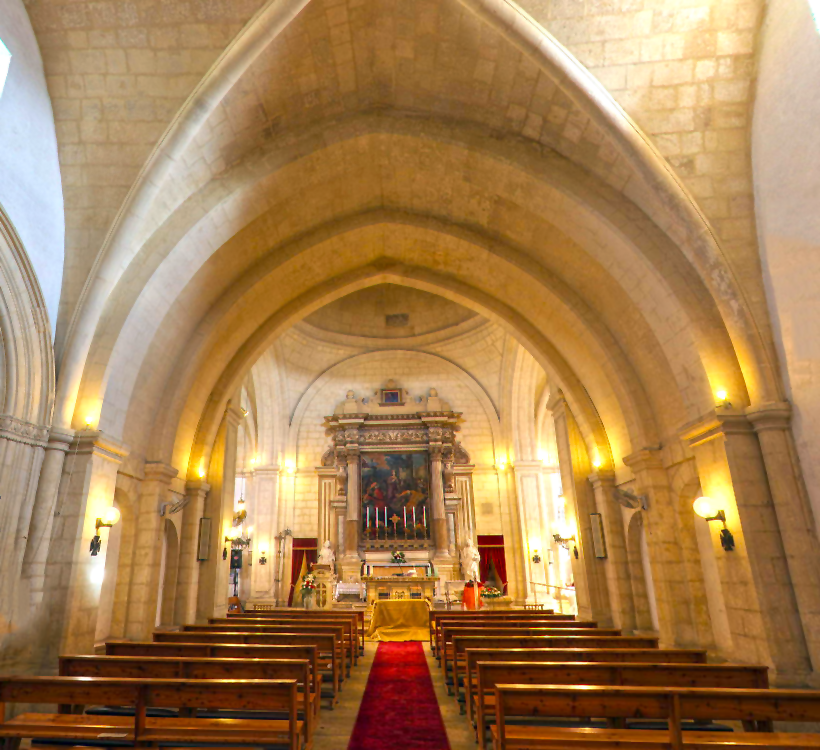
The nave of the church of St Gregory, in Żejtun.

The feast of Saint Gregory was one of the principal traditional feasts on the islands, involving a procession composed of confraternities from all the parishes on the islands. The origin of this feast was unknown for centuries, with the common belief that it related to a general vow by the populace on their deliverance from a great plague in 1519. Recent studies have concluded that the procession was first held in 1543 by Bishop Cubelles, in response to a papal call for prayers for peace. Originally the feast was held on 12 March, later moving to Easter Wednesday.

The procession included the respective clergy from all the islands' towns and villages, the canons of the Cathedral and the bishop, who assembled together – initially starting from Mdina, but later beginning at Raħal Ġdid, or Tarxien, thence walking to Żejtun. On their way, the whole company joined in the litany, as pronounced by the chief priest of each confraternity. On their arrival at Żejtun, the procession visited the church of Saint Gregory. At a particular point of the ceremony, the crowd exclaimed aloud for three times the word Misericordia. The remaining part of the day was then spent in eating and feasting, and other kinds of amusements.

The modern procession begins at the Chapel of Saint Clement, which is just over a kilometre away from the church of Saint Gregory. On the way, it enters the current parish-church of Żejtun, then continuing to Saint Gregory's. On arrival, a mass is celebrated by the Cathedral Chapter's dean, with the archbishop presiding the ceremony. Traditionally, after the ceremony those in attendance go to the nearby harbour of Marsaxlokk for their first swim of the year. Traditional food stands and fairs are held throughout the day. Historically, it used to be customary for the bridegrooms to take their spouses to this feast as part of their marriage contract.

=== Early modern ===
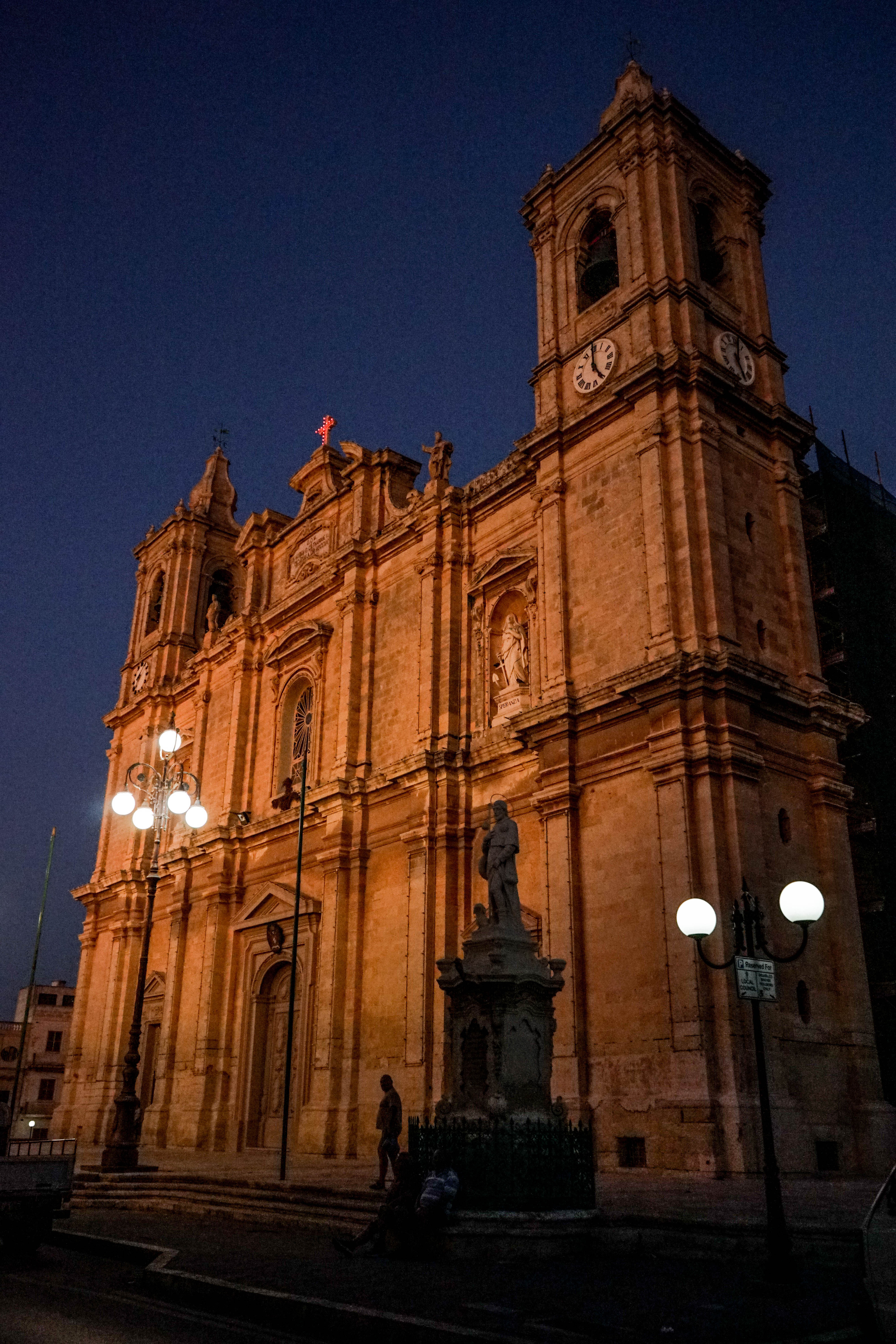
The parish church of Saint Catherine of Alexandria, V.M., finished in 1778.

By 1575, the parish of Żejtun contained nineteen churches, seven in Żejtun, three in Ħal Għaxaq, five at Żabbar and four rural chapels. On 6 July 1614, a considerable Turkish force of sixty galleys laid anchor at Marsascala and St Thomas' Bay. The Turks pillaged Żejtun, damaging the church of St Gregory's, and the surrounding villages. The attack continued until the Turkish pirates were forced back to their ships by the Maltese cavalry and militia. A member of the Żejtun contingent, Clemente Tabone, built a chapel dedicated to St Clement, possibly in commemoration of the deliverance from the attack. This attack confirmed the need of the coastal towers of St Thomas and St Luciano, in Marsascala and Marsaxlokk respectively. Increased population, and the extensive size of the parish led to an eventual reorganisation. On 23 December 1615, Bishop Baldassere Cagliares separated Żabbar from the parish of Żejtun, while Ħal Għaxaq was recognised as a parish on 1 January 1626. Cagliares also built a country house on the edge of the valley between Żejtun and Żabbar.

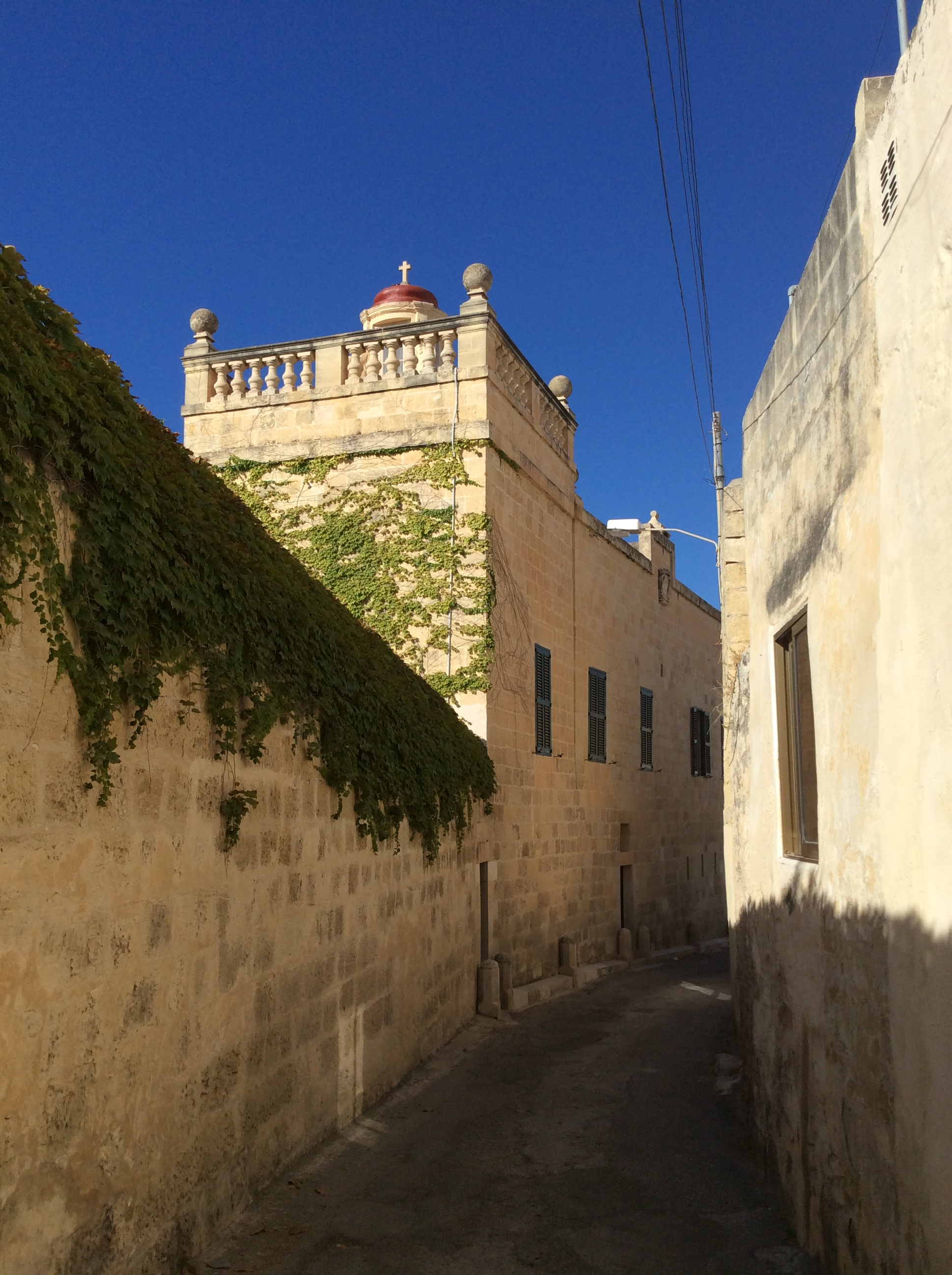
Villa Cagliares, a baroque country villa built by Bishop Baldassare Cagliares.

In 1637, Grandmaster Giovanni Paolo Lascaris set out to levy a tax of 50,000 scudi on the Maltese for the construction of the Floriana Lines. The Grandmaster ignored a protest against the tax by the Maltese clergy, lodged with Pope Urban VIII. The Pope sided with the Order against the laity and the clergy, and the Grandmaster ordered taxmen to start their collections. The tax collectors met immediately with opposition and an uprising began in September in Żejtun, the first village where collection was attempted. The leaders hoped to assemble the people at Marsa, then to march on Valletta as a procession with a cross or some statue of a saint. The parish priest of Żejtun was alarmed at these preparations, particularly the suggestions to bear arms in the protest, and informed Bishop Miguel Juan Balaguer Camarasa. The Bishop sent the priest to the inquisitor, Fabio Chigi, later Pope Alexander VII, who ordered him to report everything to the grandmaster. The latter imprisoned the lay leaders of the revolt. Acting on Chigi's advice, the grandmaster did not arrest local priests, even if there were suspicions they were involved in the revolt.

Around half a century after the reorganisation of the south-eastern parishes, Gregorio Bonnici, a local nobleman, bought a tract of land for the construction of a new parish church. The foundation stone was laid by Bishop Davide Cocco Palmieri on 25 November 1692, with Don Ugolino Bonnici as archpriest. The church was designed by Lorenzo Gafà, with the lateral wings being later additions. The church was consecrated on 11 May 1742, with the anniversary of the consecration celebrated on the fifth Sunday of Easter. The church became a focal point for the south east of the island, providing new and ample wall space for the artists of the late Maltese Baroque. Artists such as Enrico Regnaud, Gio Nicola Buhagiar and Francesco Zahra all executed works in this church. The latter was the most talented artist of this period, whose presence in Żejtun was secured at an early age because his father, Pietro Paolo, was working on the stone carvings within the same church. The two side naves were finished in 1778.

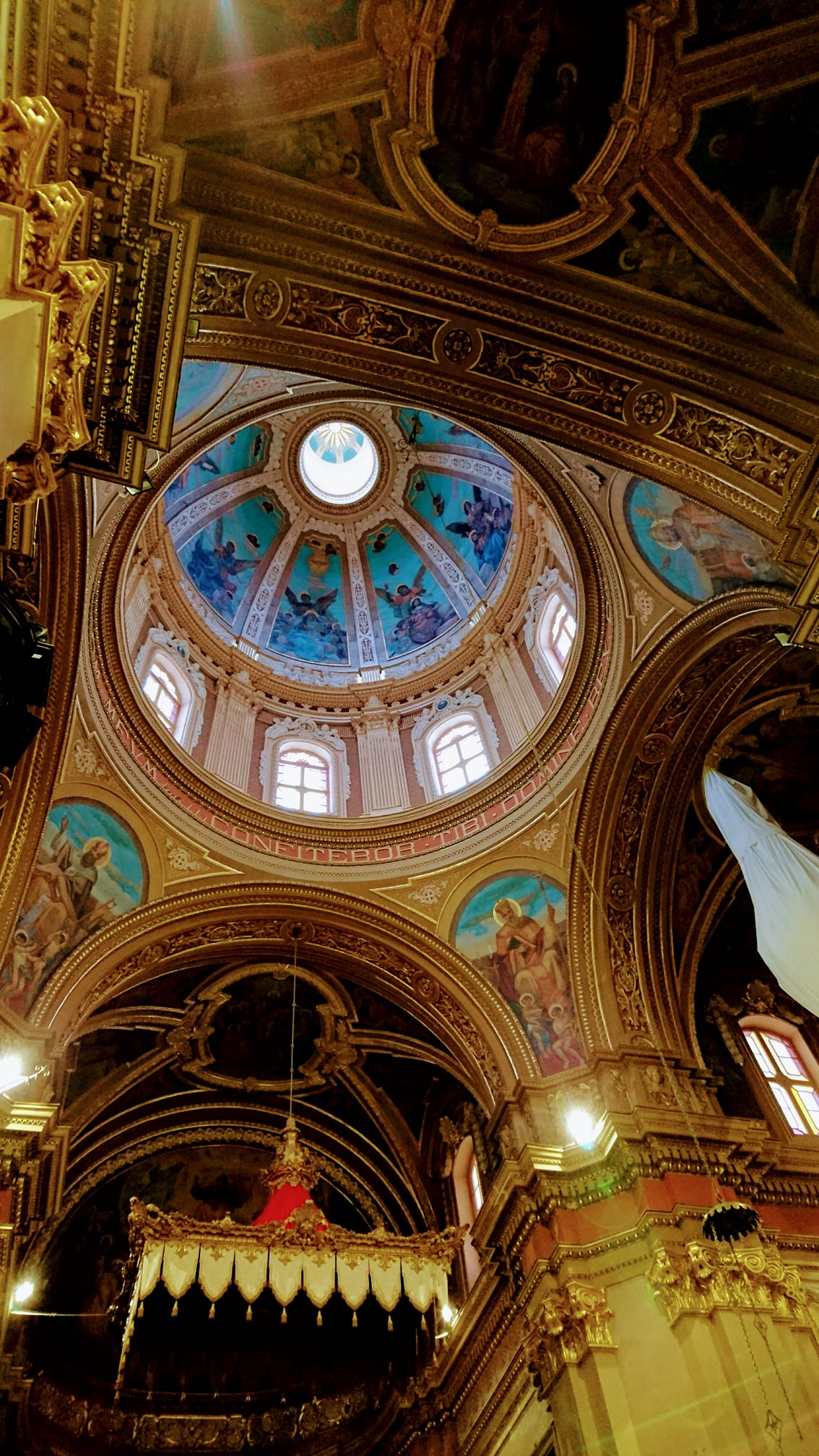
Dome and interior view of the parish church of Saint Catherine of Alexandria.

The area in front of the new parish church, which lay between the two old cores, was built up immediately after construction works began on the church. This land, known as Gwiedi, includes a number of palaces, chapels and large houses. Gregorio Bonnici's palace, Ædes Danielis, stands to this day on the main thoroughfare to the parish church. Grandmaster Perellós built a summer residence, Casa Perellos in the narrow streets of Gwiedi, as a country residence during the feast of Saint Gregory.

A 1791 report by the Maltese Chamber of Commerce lists Żejtun, along with Valletta and four other cities, as one of the principal trading and commercial centres on the island. In fact, Żejtun was a principal residence for Maltese merchants in the late seventeenth century. Around 19% of Maltese merchants in El Puerto de Santa María, Andalusia in 1791 came from Żejtun. In 1771, of the total number of Maltese merchants in Valencia, 55% of merchants came from Senglea or Cospicua, while 32% resided in Żejtun. Such was the city's importance to commerce that seventeenth century contemporaries requested the construction of a public school in Żejtun, as it was a city where many merchants were to be encountered.

In 1797, Grandmaster Ferdinand von Hompesch zu Bolheim was invited by the parishioners of Żejtun for the feast of St Catherine. After the feast, Don Giacomo Michele Tortella, in the name of the clergy of Żejtun and the villagers, petitioned the Grandmaster to raise the village of Żejtun to the status of a city, on grounds of the town's large size, its established commercial interests and military contribution. The petition was received, and on 30 December 1797, Grandmaster Hompesch recognised Żejtun as a city, granting it the title Ċittà Beland, this being his mother's maiden name. (Note: (in Latin) "Fiat p. perpetuite sub nomine Beland.")

During the French Blockade, Żejtun was garrisoned by Maltese irregulars and British elements. The Maltese built a number of batteries to protect the city. By the end of December 1799, the bulk of the 30th (Cambridgeshire) Regiment of Foot was stationed in the city, with advanced posts at Żabbar, and San Rocco Battery close to the coast. In case of a French incursion from behind the Cottonera Lines, the Maltese troops in Żabbar were to pull back rapidly and concentrate their forces on Żejtun. The town was ideally placed for defence, standing on a hill two hundred feet high, and surveying the surrounding countryside all the way to the Three Cities. Moreover, the old town core of Żejtun was easily defended, being a tightly packed maze of houses and narrow streets. During the blockade, the Żejtun regiment mounted an attack on an enemy entrenchment on Fort San Salvatore. During the same attack, the regiment went on to clear Villa Bighi from French forces and then snatched from under the French held fortifications a large wooden cross, which stood in the front parvis of the abandoned Capuchin Friary at Kalkara. The Friary later hosted a battery manned by Maltese insurgents. The cross, held as a war trophy, was displayed in the main square of the city, as a reminder for future generations of the bravery of its people.

Four buildings in Żejtun – the old church of St. Gregory, a villa belonging to Bishop Vincenzo Labini, and two villas belonging to Count Agostino Formosa de Fremaux (Palazzo Fremaux and Villa Arrigo) – were used as hospitals for invalids in the insurgency against the French. Captain Alexander Ball, stayed at Żejtun on 15 January 1799, in order to meet with the leader of a group of irregulars, Vincenzo Borg "Brared". The meeting was not held due to the latter's ill health. In recognition of the villagers’ participation in the revolt against the French, a garden was built in 1802 by Alexander Ball, then British High Commissioner, as a gift to the leading representative of Żejtun, Ġuzè Abela. The garden, named Ġnien il-Kmand, served for administrative and embellishment purposes. The garden was designed by Michele Cachia.

=== Late modern and contemporary ===
The first British governor of the islands, Sir Thomas Maitland, instituted a number of reforms to the administrative and judicial systems of Malta. An important reform set-up local governments, first abolishing the old Luogotenente system by a proclamation issued in 1815. In its place, the post of Luogotenente di Governo was established, with the new official being entrusted with the responsibility of administering one of six districts. Żejtun, along with Għaxaq, Żabbar, Tarxien, Paola, Gudja and Luqa, formed the District of Żejtun. The first Luogotenente di Governo of the Żejtun District was Baron Pascalo Sciberras.

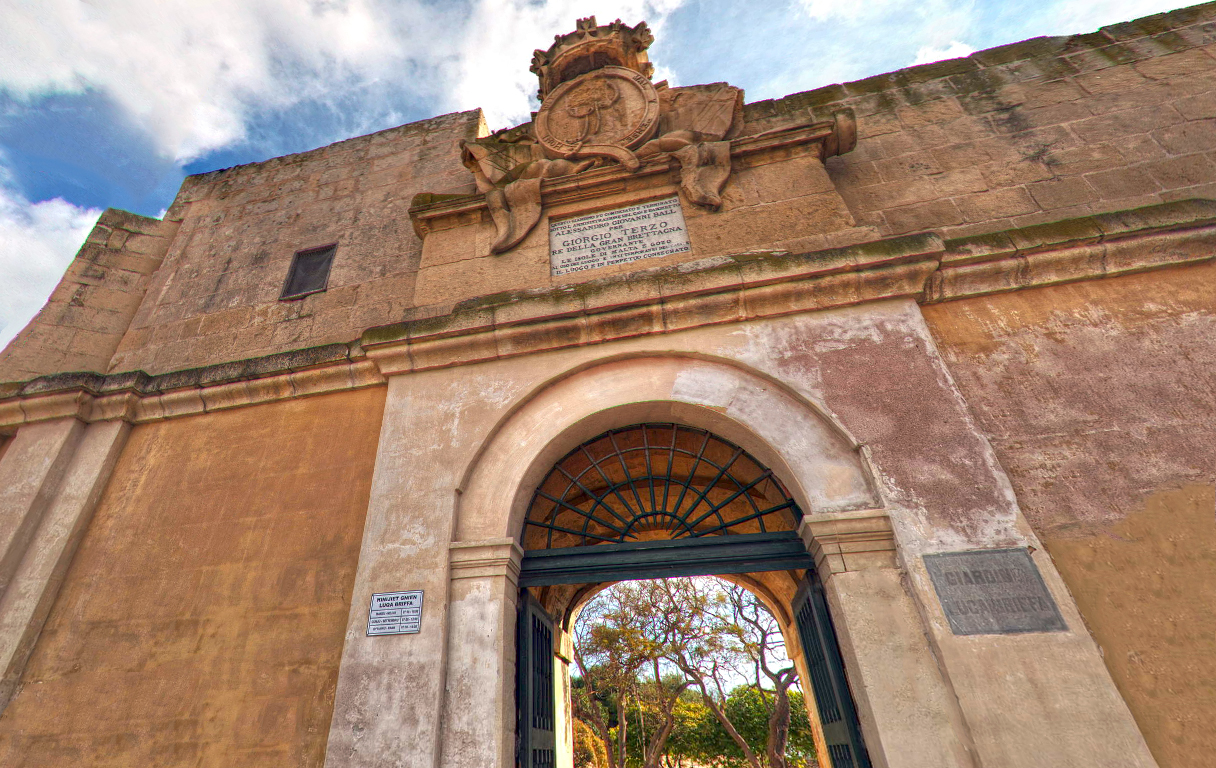
Luqa Briffa Garden or Ġnien il-Kmand was designed by Michele Cachia.

Around the beginning of the 19th century, Żejtun continued to be a major contributor to the islands' agrarian economy. Many of the Maltese merchants and traders hailed from the city. Żejtun had the largest amount of arable land devoted to food production on the island, amounting to 8,585 acres (3,474 ha), or 15.1% of total land under cultivation. Żejtun was the cotton producing centre of the islands, producing 10,312 cwt (hundredweights) of cotton, or 20.8% of the total production in 1836. Such was the importance of the town for commerce, that a local merchant owned a single deck polacre, named Zeitun. As Malta's economy shifted to the servicing of the Royal Navy, much of the islands' commercial activity moved to the fortified cities around the harbour. The importance of the town declined gradually over time.

A venture by the British Irish and Colonial Silk Company to introduce silk production in Malta led to the planting of many mulberry trees in Żejtun in 1826, along Triq l-Aħħar Ħbit mit-Torok. Over the years, the trees became so deep-rooted in local history that their stretch of the main road from Fgura to Żejtun became known to locals as Triq iċ-Ċawsli (Mulberry Road).

Żejtun was linked with a main aqueduct providing water from Fawwara, with the project commissioned by Governor Henry F. Bouviere. The aqueduct began providing water to the town in 1845. Twenty years later, in 1865, a cholera outbreak led to 84 deaths in the city out of a total population of 5,491. These were concentrated in the highest part town, near a windmill in the "upper casal, or el rahal ta' fuk."

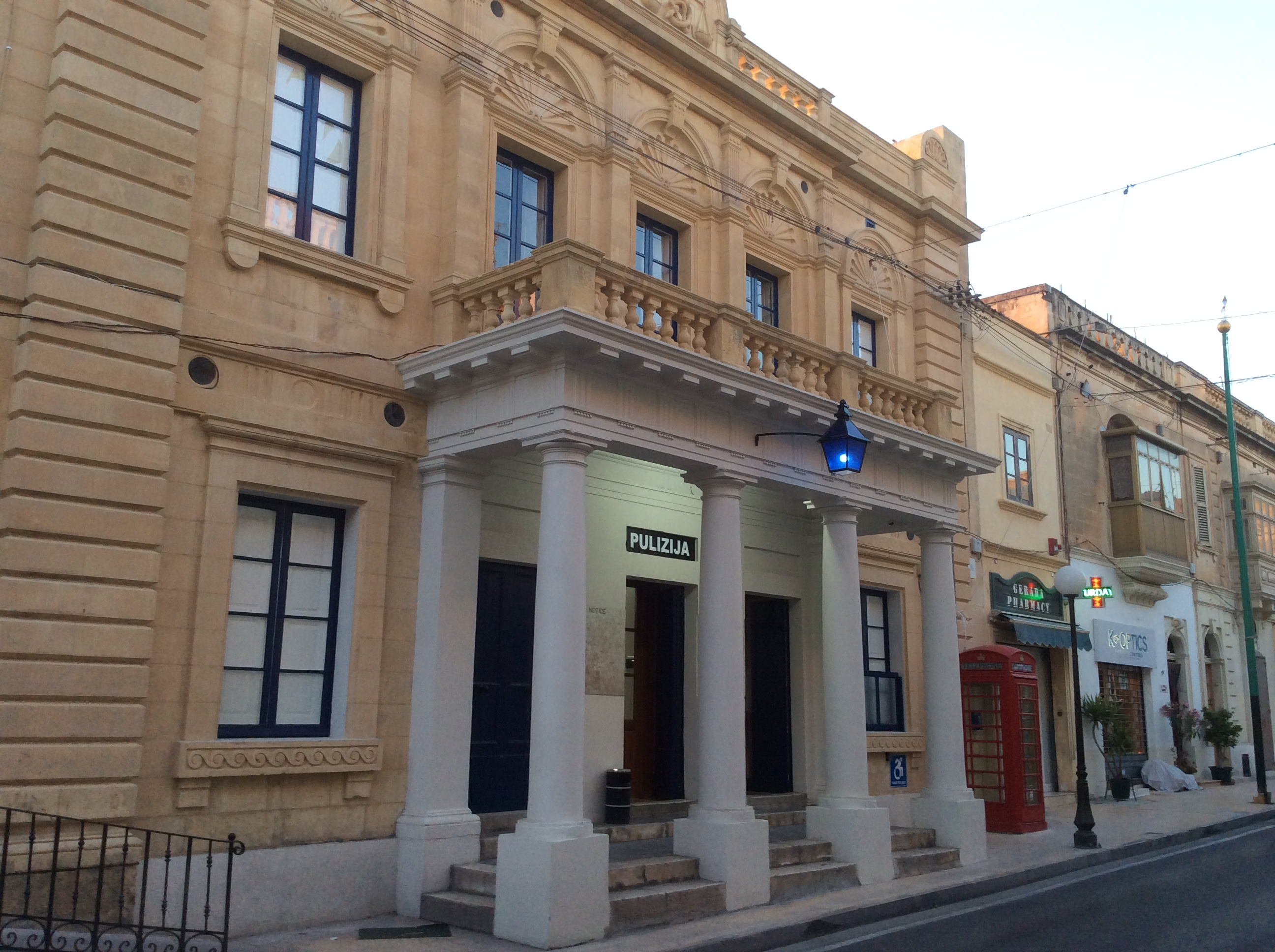
The Żejtun Police Station was built in a Neo-Classical style.

Most of the fishermen who worked out of Marsaxlokk bay hailed from Żejtun, commuting back and forth from the shore. Around 1846, the first houses began to be built in Marsaxlokk, as fishermen from Żejtun settled there permanently. Eventually, the fishing village of Marsaxlokk was separated from Żejtun and became a distinct parish in January 1897. As the town of Żejtun continued to develop, the British colonial administration built a police station and a public school. The latter was completed in 1908. Both buildings are built in a Neo-Classical style, synonymous with public buildings under British Rule.

A year later, in 1909, the Daughters of the Sacred Heart set up a children's home in the town. In 1913, Josephine Curmi established a home for girls in Żejtun, which was eventually transferred to its current premises in 1925 - the Jesus of Nazareth Home. The charitable institute was placed under the care and direction of the Missionaries of Jesus of Nazareth.

In the 1930s, the Żejtun parish minted 6000 aluminium token coins inscribed Zeitun to use as change when renting a chair during religious functions. The locals began to use the tokens as currency, until they were banned by the authorities. The tokens were collected back and stored in the parish treasury, and were forgotten. They were rediscovered in 2011, with the parish selling them to fund the restoration of the church's chandeliers. They have since become collector's items.

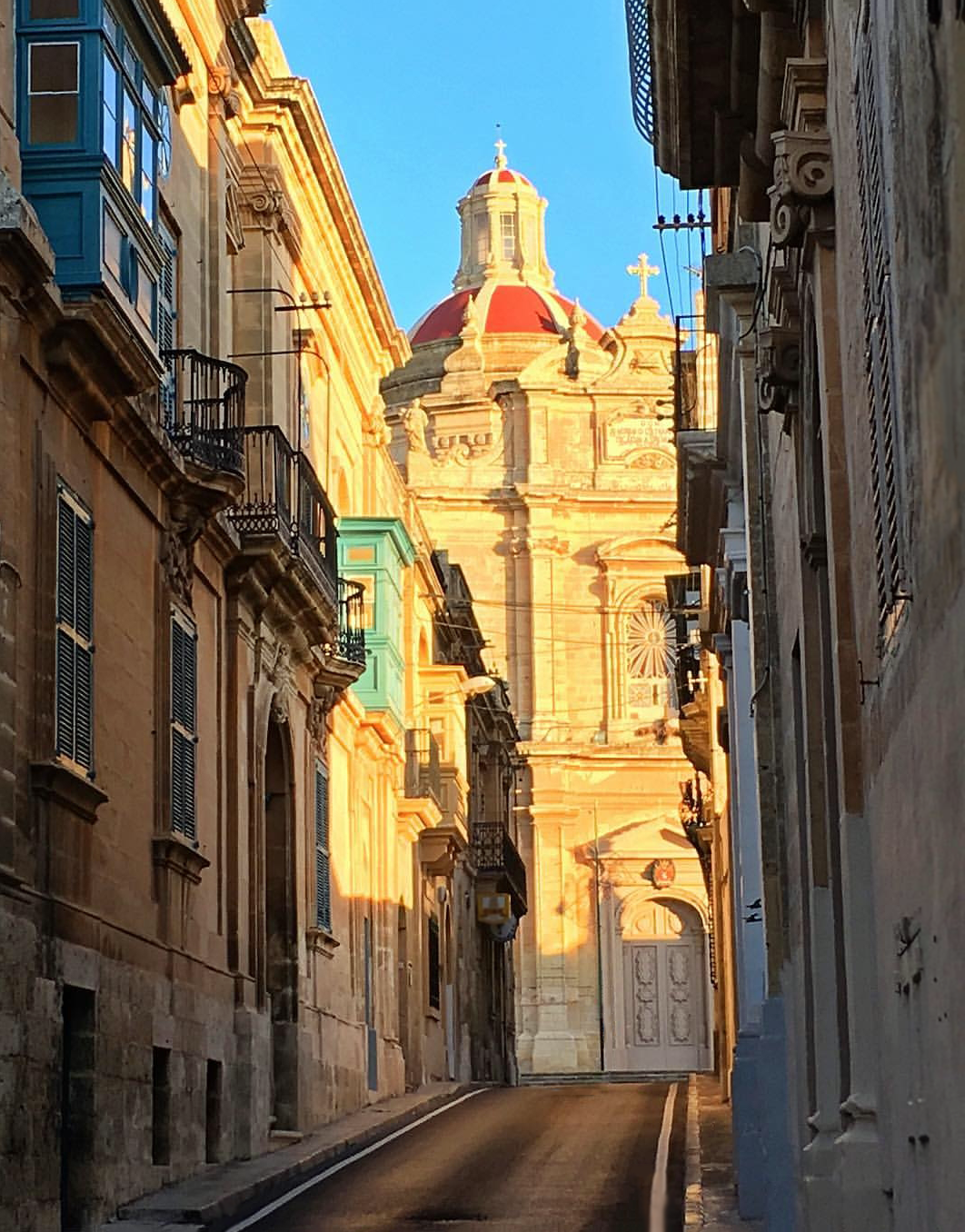
Streetscape view with Żejtun's parish church, taken from Triq Santa Katerina in Gwiedi.

Part of Żejtun's school served as a hospital in the Second World War, also housing the Dorsetshire Regiment. The number of victims from Żejtun during this war amounted to 113, with the city suffering a number of air raids due to its relative proximity with the dockyards. A marble plaque in the main square commemorates a particular air raid on the city.

After the war, a number of urbanisation projects were designed around Żejtun. These include housing estates in Ġebel San Martin, Ħal Tmin and Ta' Ganza. Home ownership schemes and the availability of housing plots led to increased urban sprawl and congestion. The town, however, retained some of its rural character. As early as 1952, the region around Żejtun was identified as one of the areas best suited for irrigation with treated second-class water. The suitability of the quadrangle between Żejtun, Marsascala, Marsaxlokk and St Thomas' Bay was highlighted because it contained sufficient area of gently sloping land that could be irrigated by gravity. An FAO study in the early 1970s confirmed two areas in the South-East Malta, centred around Żejtun, which were deemed suitable for second-class water irrigation.

In the 1980s, Żejtun was known for fervent political rivalry which culminated in 1986, with an infamous riot involving supporters of Malta's two main political parties. The clashes took place on 30 November 1986 after the Nationalist party proposed to hold a mass meeting in the town, traditionally regarded as a staunch blue collar area dominated by the Labour party. The incidents sparked some of the most serious episodes of political violence in Malta and eventually, a crucial constitutional amendment guaranteeing majority rule. The confrontations took place on the main road approaching the town, known as Tal-Barrani. Reconciliation and peace, however, prevailed.

In recent years, Żejtun has benefited from a number of infrastructural projects and road upgrades, including the opening of Malta's first segregated bidirectional bike lane linking Żejtun to Żabbar. The Malta Business Registry inaugurated its head office in Żejtun in 2019. A local NGO, Wirt iż-Żejtun, successfully pressured government to withdraw plans to extend Bulebel industrial estate over nearby farmland, in order to protect the heritage of the south of Malta.

== Government ==
Historical population
Year	Pop.	±%
1667	1,222	—
1679	1,575	+28.9%
1687	1,607	+2.0%
1716	2,224	+38.4%
1720	2,375	+6.8%
1725	2,497	+5.1%
1730	2,643	+5.8%
1735	2,665	+0.8%
1740	2,989	+12.2%
1744	2,985	−0.1%
1779	3,610	+20.9%
1782	3,687	+2.1%
1797	4,665	+26.5%
1805	4,024	−13.7%
1833	5,250	+30.5%
1839	5,113	−2.6%
1851	5,188	+1.5%
1865	5,491	+5.8%
1890	6,720	+22.4%
1931	8,731	+29.9%
1948	11,980	+37.2%
1957	11,665	−2.6%
1967	10,440	−10.5%
1985	11,321	+8.4%
1993	12,164	+7.4%
1994	11,326	−6.9%
1995	11,314	−0.1%
1996	11,379	+0.6%
1997	11,519	+1.2%
1998	11,722	+1.8%
1999	11,649	−0.6%
2000	11,331	−2.7%
2001	11,841	+4.5%
2002	11,793	−0.4%
2003	11,810	+0.1%
2004	11,758	−0.4%
2005	11,713	−0.4%
2006	11,789	+0.6%
2007	11,777	−0.1%
2008	11,558	−1.9%
2009	11,388	−1.5%
2010	11,417	+0.3%
2011	11,368	−0.4%
2012	11,302	−0.6%
2013	11,252	−0.4%
2014	11,262	+0.1%
2015	11,245	−0.2%
2016	11,218	−0.2%
Source: Status Animarum 1679 – 1833, NSO 1931 – 2011, NSO 2012 – 2016

=== Local Council ===
The Local Council is presently represented by Joan Agius (PL) as Mayor, Raymond Caruana as Vice Mayor (PL) together with seven councillors, namely Enya Abela (PN), Christian Attard (PL), Anton Aquilina (PL), Dorcas Camilleri (PL), Roderick Caruana (PN), Ivan Giardina (PL) and Luke Doublet (PL). The current Executive Secretary to the Town Council is Anton Falzon. The term of the current local council was not extended to five years with last elections having been held in June 2024.

== Education ==
Żejtun has a secondary school for girls, St Margaret's College, located close to Saint Gregory's Church. The primary school, consists of two primary schools, Żejtun Primary 'A' Dun Alwiġ Camilleri and Żejtun Primary 'B'. A kindergarten school and a church school, Theresa Nuzzo School, can also be found in Żejtun.

== Culture ==
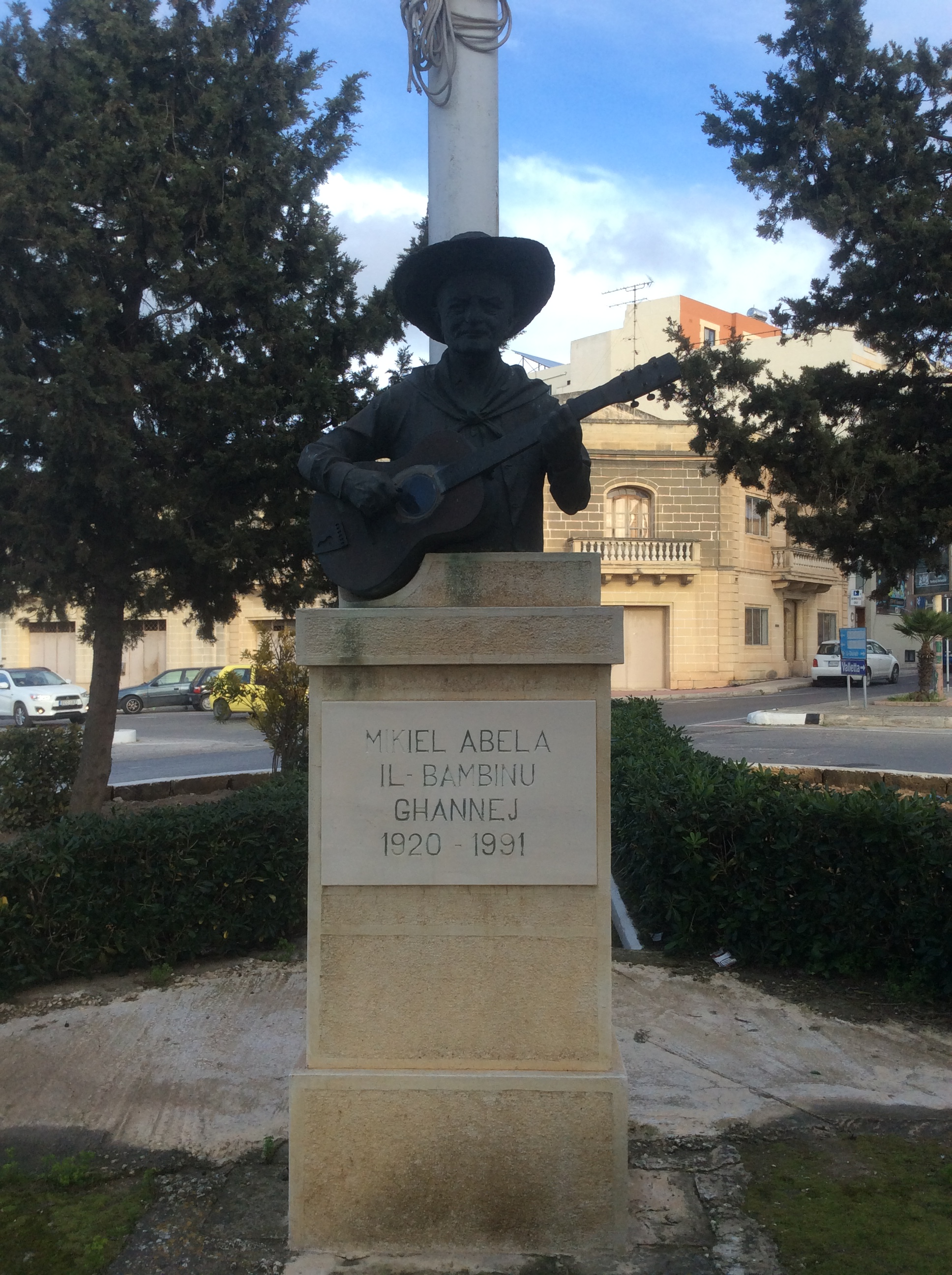
Statue of Mikiel Abela Il-Bambinu

=== Dialect ===
The Żejtun accent long ago acquired the label of a dialect, and is similar to many accents of the south east of Malta. In Maltese this is termed as Żejtuni and by the speakers as Żejtewnij. The dialect is spoken by local inhabitants and those in neighbouring settlements around the city, such as Marsaxlokk.

Żejtun is considered the hub of Maltese folk singing, l-għana and the city has given Malta many of its most respected folk singers. These include Pawlu Seychell l-Għannej (1907–1992), Pawlu Degabriele il-Bies (1908–1980), Mikiel Abela il-Bambinu (1920–1991), Żaren Mifsud Ta' Vestru (1924–1999), and Frans Baldacchino il-Budaj (1943–2006). Famous contemporary Żejtun folksingers include Fredu Abela iż-Żejtuni and Mikiel Cutajar is-Superstar.

=== Religion ===
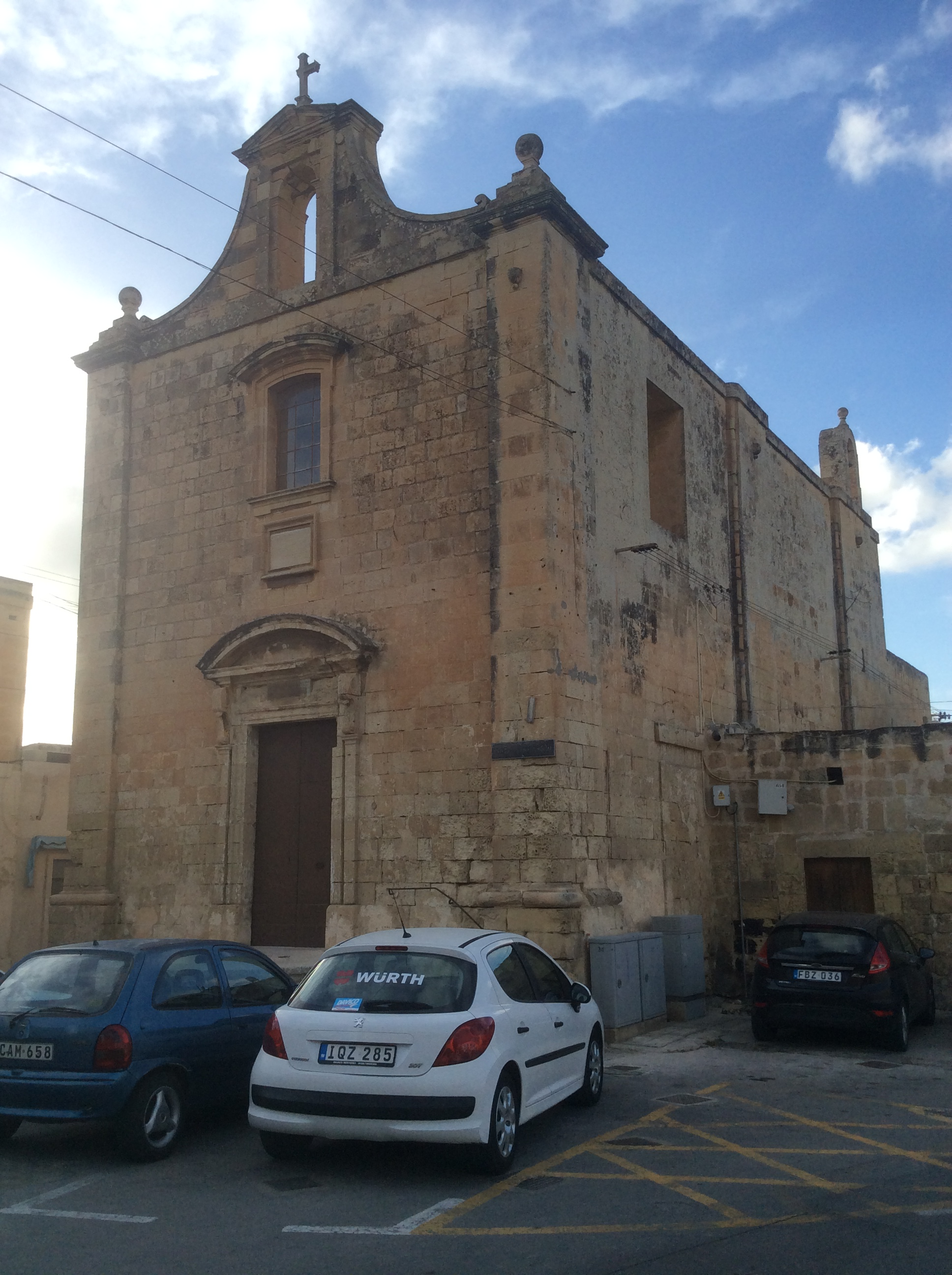
Church of St. Angelo

An important event taking place in the town during the year is the feast of St Catherine of Alexandria, which is now celebrated in summer and not in the traditional date of 25 November. On this day Żejtun's two rival musical bands, the Banda Beland and the Żejtun Band, perform in Gregorio Bonnici Square. The anthem dedicated to St. Catherine of Alexandria, which is played during the feast, was written by Emmanuele Palmier-Cecy, and was composed by Don Lorenzo Mifsud.

On 3 October 1987, a referendum was held for Żejtun residents to see whether they wished the feast to be moved to summer, instead of its traditional day on 25 November. The referendum was held after a proposal by one of the town's feast organisations. The two village bands refused to have anything to do with the referendum, fearing it might incite division between the inhabitants. Of the 8,000 eligible voters, around 2,200 voted – roughly 25% of the electorate – of which 1,917 preferred the feast to remain in winter. 348 preferred the feast to be held in summer instead. In that year, the two village bands did not take part in the November feast events.

Żejtun boasts a large number of chapels such as the one dedicated to Saint Clement (San Klement), Our Lady of Good Counsel (Il-Madonna tal-Bon Kunsill), the chapel of Our Saviour (Tas-Salvatur) and the chapel of The Assumption (known as Santa Marija in Maltese), the chapel of the Holy Spirit (L-Ispirtu Santu) in Gwiedi, Saint Angelo (Sant' Anġlu), Saint Nicholas (San Niklaw), Our Lady of Mercy (Il-Madonna tal-Ħniena), Our Lady of Lourdes (Il-Madonna ta' Lourdes), and Saint Mary of Ħal Tmin (Santa Marija ta' Ħal Tmin). Other chapels that in the recent past were part of the Żejtun parish are the chapel of Saint Anthony (Sant' Antnin) and the chapel of Saint Gaetan (San Gejtanu) in the limits of St Thomas' Bay.

=== Dress ===
The Maltese traditional dress, the għonnella, was worn in all villages on the islands. In the south eastern corner of Malta, in particular in Żejtun, however, the traditional black faldetta was instead tailored in blue fabric. In Żejtun, this type of dress for women was called xurqana.

=== Gastronomy ===
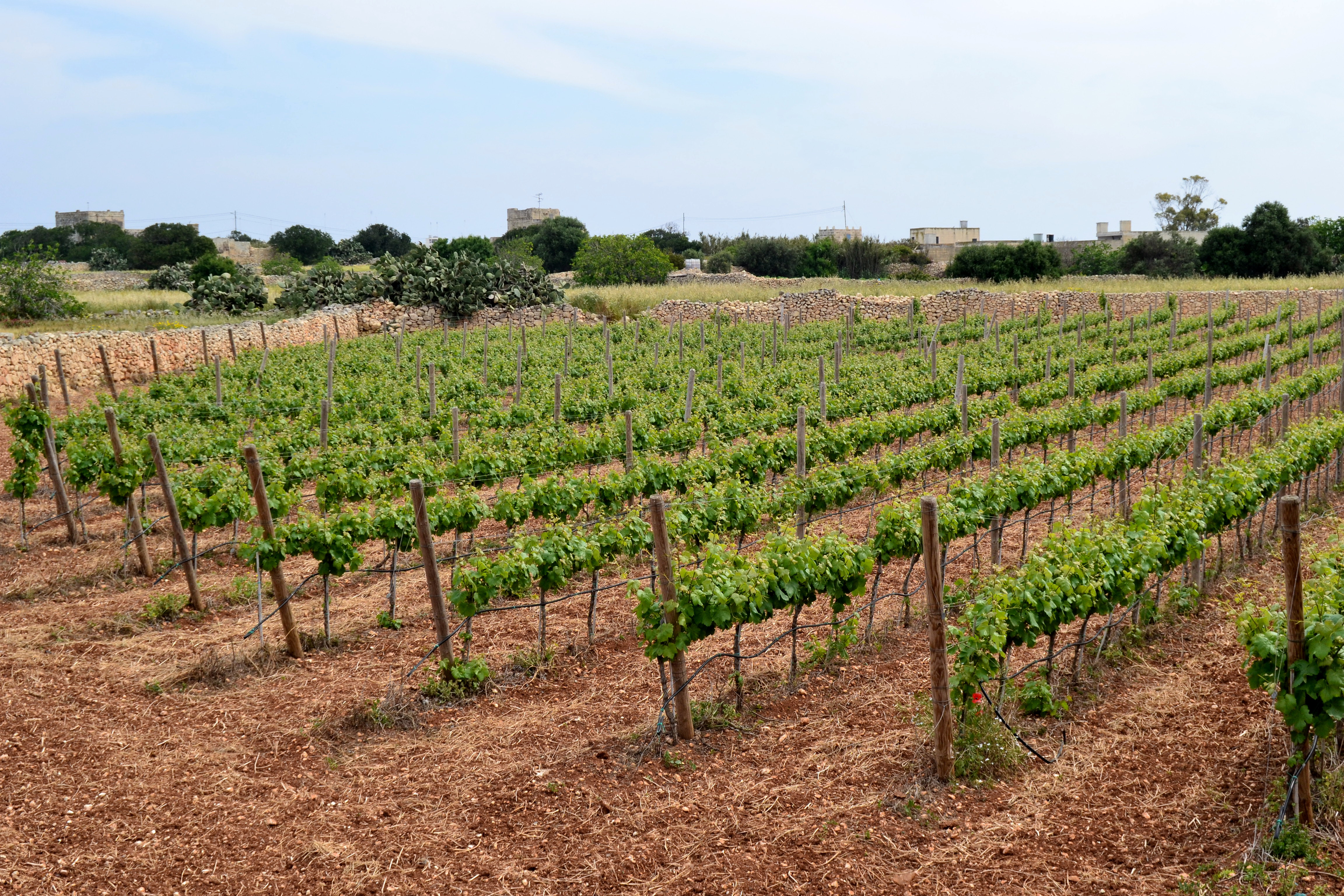
Vineyards in Żejtun

Each September, Żejtun hosts an annual festival celebrating the olive picking season and olive pressing for oil. The aim of the festival is to highlight the intimate link between the city and olive trees, and the promotion of local olive cultivation. The activity starts with a defilé delivering the olive harvest, including the reading of a proclamation, or bandu, and the blessing of the olives prior to pressing. The city is also known for its wine production, with the Marnisi wine producing estate.

== Twin towns – sister cities ==
Żejtun is twinned with:

- Birzeit, Israel
- Avola, Italy
- Celano, Italy
- Tocina, Spain
- Oborniki, Poland
