= Paolo Biancucci =

Italian painter

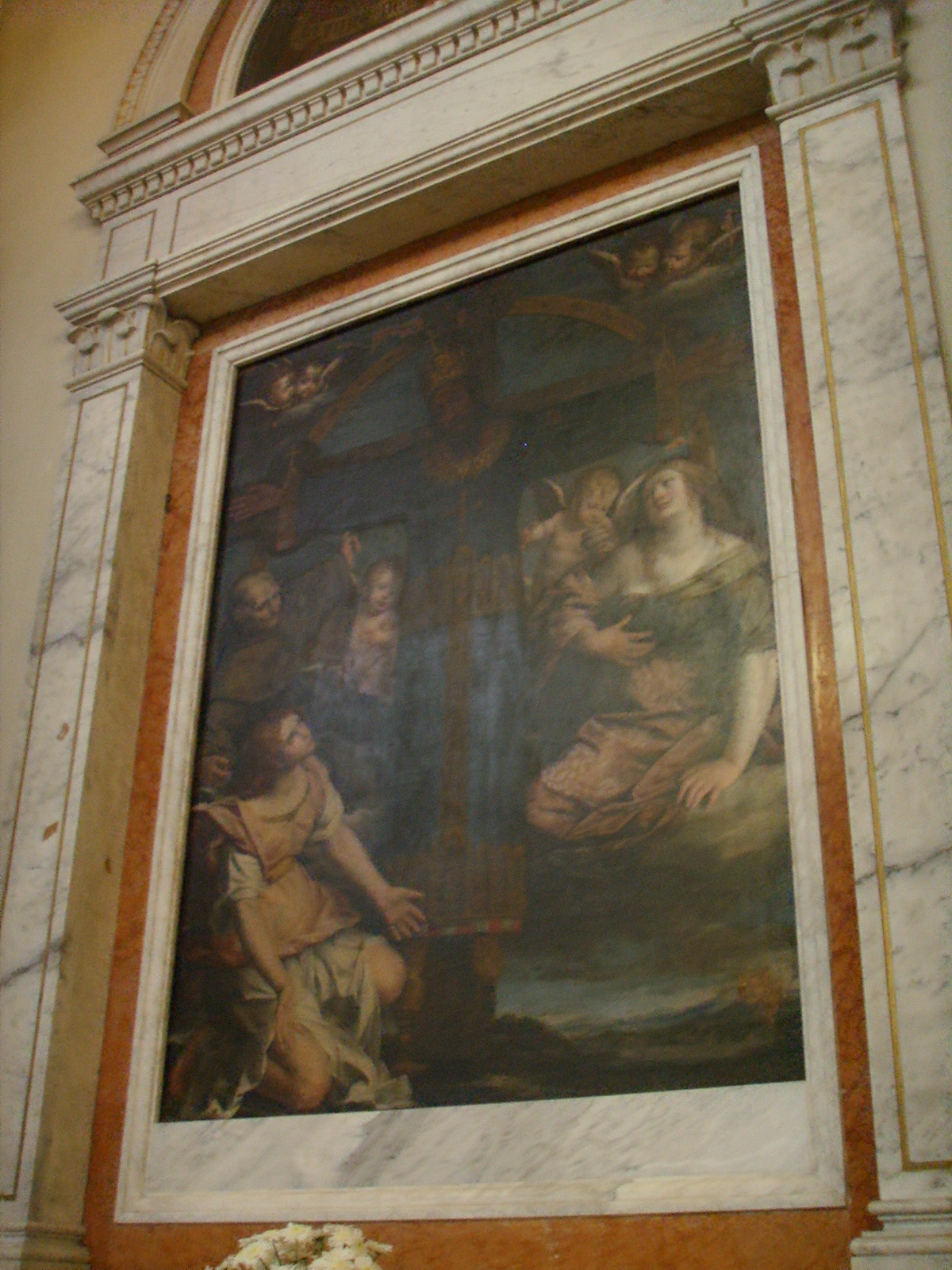
Paolo Biancucci, Saints Adore the Holy Face of Lucca, 1314

Paolo Biancucci (1583–1653) was born in Lucca and was a pupil of Guido Reni, and influenced by Sassoferrato. He painted a Purgatory, for the church of the Suffragio, and an altar-piece of several saints for San Francesco.
