= Church of the Holy Spirit, Żejtun =

Holy Spirit Chapel
- Kappella tal-Ispirtu s-Santu
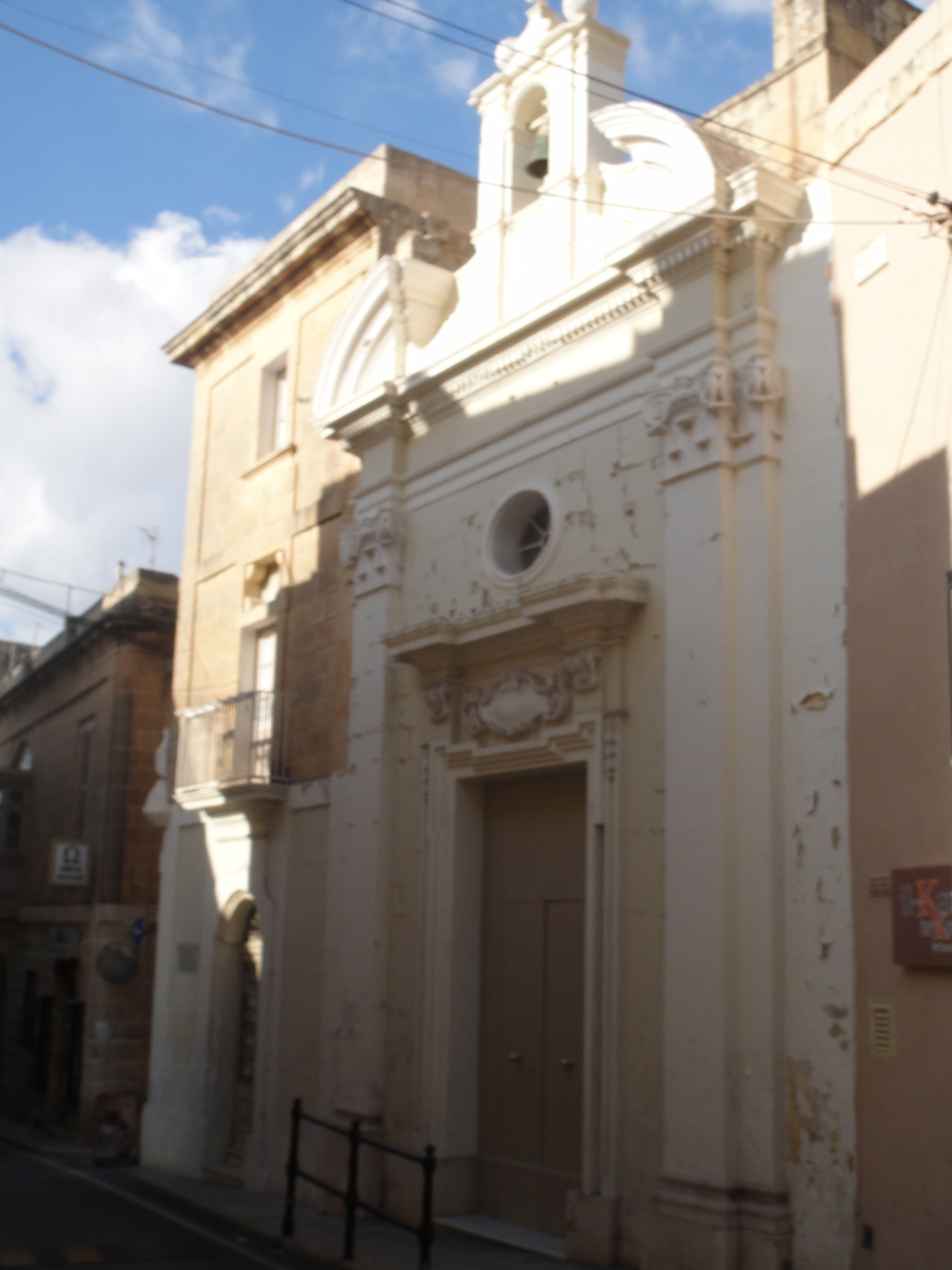

- Location within Malta
- 35°51′20.7″N 14°31′55.8″E
- Location: Żejtun
- Country: Malta
- Denomination: Roman Catholic

History
- Status: Active
- Founded: 1688
- Founder: Giovanni Cassar
- Dedication: Holy Spirit

Architecture
- Functional status: Church
- Architect: Lorenzo Gafà
- Architectural type: Greek Cross
- Style: Baroque

Administration
- Archdiocese: Malta

The Church of the Holy Spirit is a small Roman Catholic baroque church located in Żejtun, Malta.

== History ==
Plans to build this Christian church were made on November 21, 1618, when Giovanni Cassar left a piece of land in his will which was to be used to build a church dedicated to the Holy Spirit. The present church was built in 1688 to plans by Lorenzo Gafà. Nonetheless, between 1788 and 1798 the church was extensively restructured, which gave it the form in which it is today. Prior to this restructuring, the church's facade was where today's back side is and vice versa. The church was also built on a crypt, the only church to have a crypt in the village.

== Interior ==
The painting above the high altar, dating from either the 17th or 18th century depicts the descent of the Holy Spirit on the Apostles on Pentecost. There are also two painting on the side of the main painting, one depicting the Archangel Raphael with Tobias and the other depicting St Jude the Apostle. There are a total of 3 altars, 2 being side altars. One of these is dedicated to Our Lady of the Pillar. Above the altar is a statue of the Virgin of the Pillar the work of Marjamu Gerada. The other altar is dedicated in honor of Our Lady of Sorrows with a paint of the same dedication by Toussaints Busuttil dating from 1945.
