= Francesco Buonamici (architect) =

Italian architect (1596–1677)

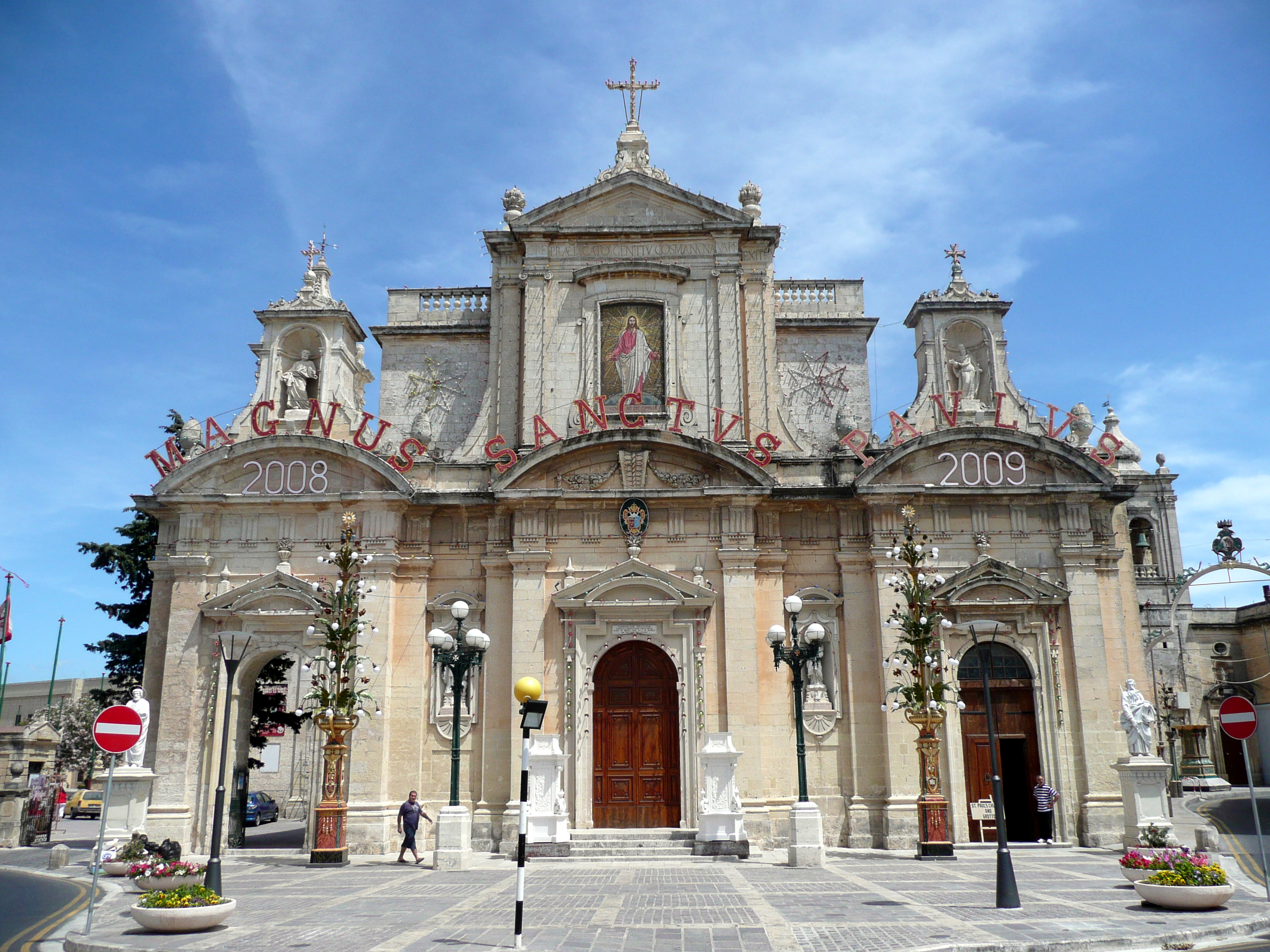
- Born: 1596; Lucca, Republic of Lucca
- Died: 26 June 1677 (aged 81); Lucca, Republic of Lucca
- Resting place: Church of the Suffragio, Lucca
- Education: Accademia di San Luca
- Occupation: Architect
- Style: Baroque
- Parents: Antonio Buonamici (father); Anna Pistelli (mother)

Francesco Buonamici (1596 – 26 June 1677) was an Italian Baroque architect, painter and engraver who was active in Lucca, Malta, Sicily and Rome during the 17th century. He played a significant role in the introduction of Baroque in Malta.

== Biography ==
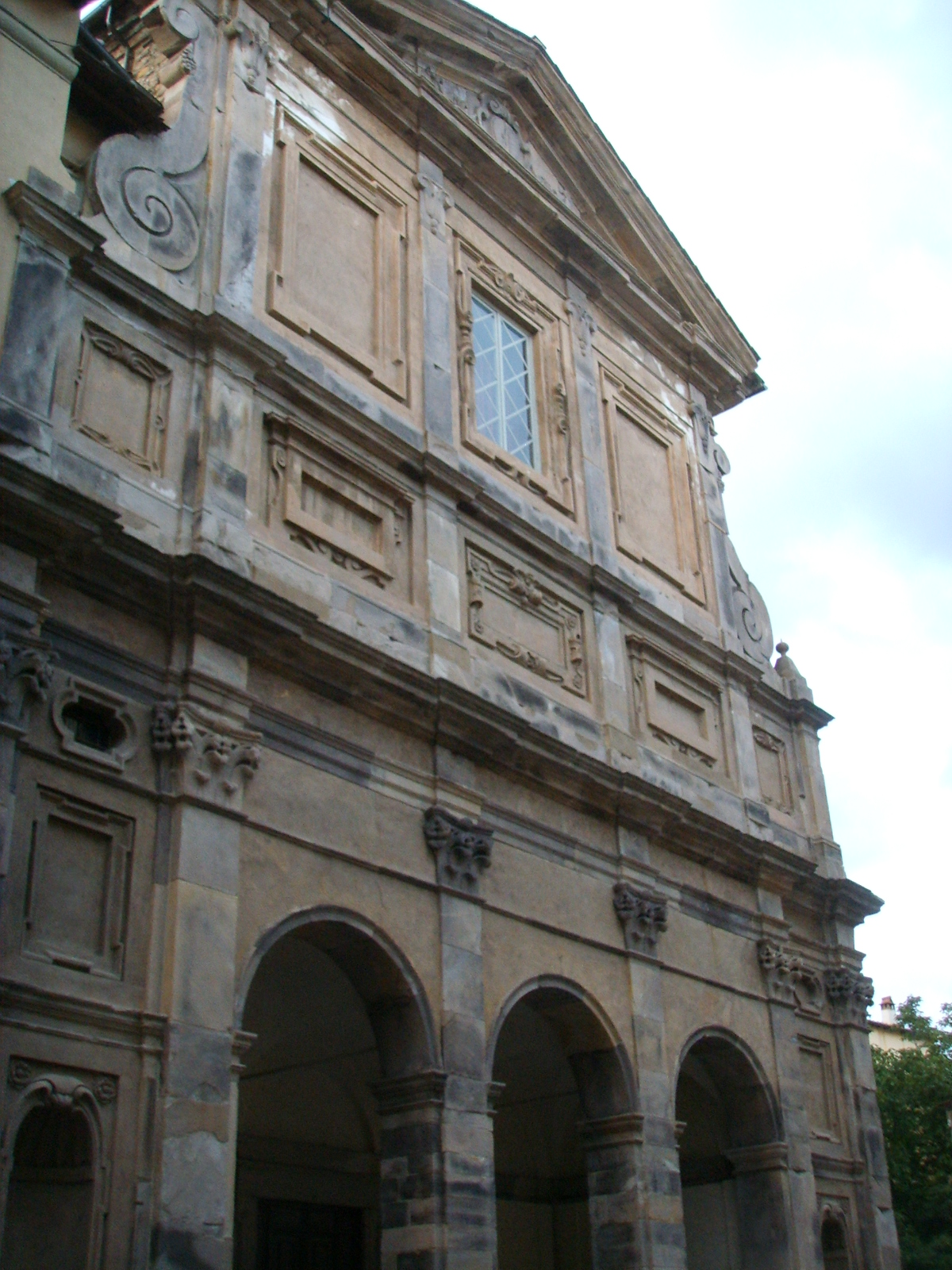
Church of the Suffragio, Lucca

Buonamici was born to Antonio Buonamici and Anna Pistelli in Lucca in 1596. He spent his youth in Rome, where he studied at the Accademia di San Luca. Some details of his life and career are unclear since there are contradictory sources, and he is sometimes referred to as Vincenzo Buonamici. It is possible that he started his career in Rome, but after the plague of 1630–1631 he was active in his hometown Lucca, where he designed the Suffragio church on the site of a cemetery for plague victims. While in Rome in 1634, he painted theatre scenes for the opera Il Sant'Alessio.

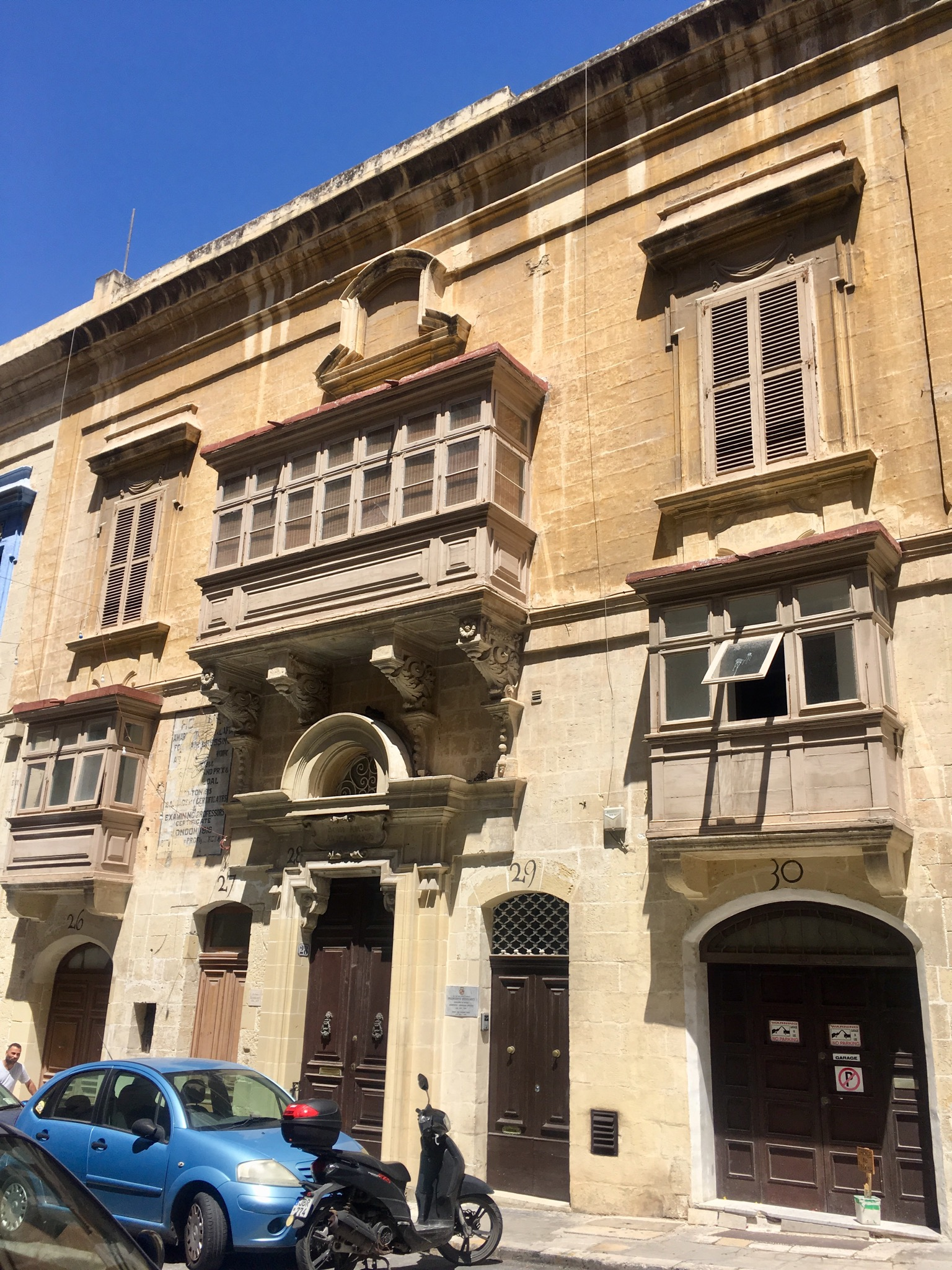
House in Valletta where Buonamici lived in during his stay in Malta

Through the patronage of Cardinal Francesco Barberini, Buonamici went to Hospitaller Malta in September 1635 as a maestro di pennello within the entourage of Pietro Paolo Floriani, the Pope's military engineer who was sent to Malta to design the Floriana Lines. Buonamici planned to stay in Malta for a few months, but he ended up remaining on the islands for almost 25 years. He was employed by the Order of St John and he has been called "the father of Baroque architecture in Malta" since he played a major role in the introduction of the Roman Baroque style on the islands. The Maltese architect Lorenzo Gafà probably began his career as an apprentice of Buonamici.

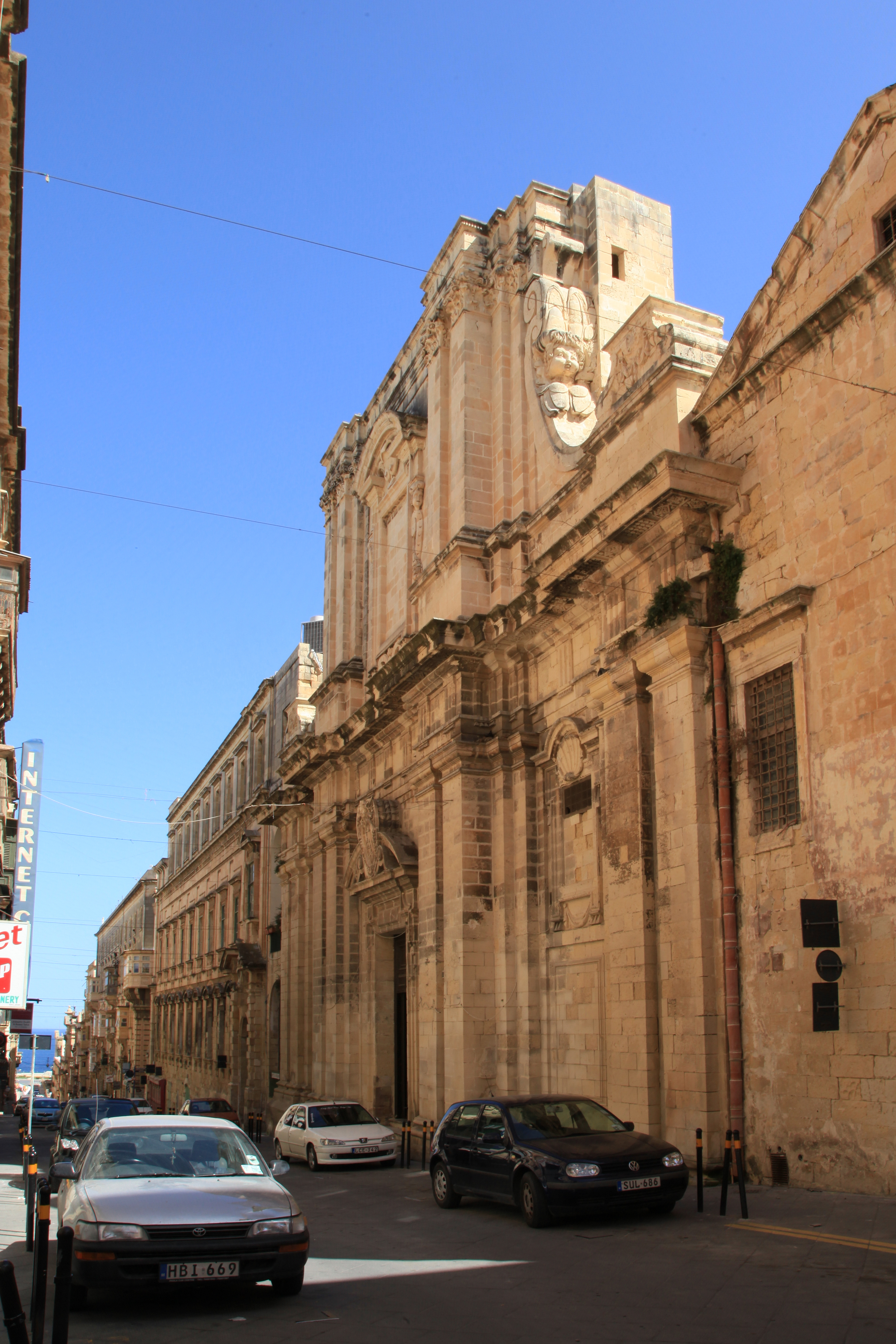
Church of the Jesuits, Valletta

In Malta, Buonamici designed the Church of the Jesuits in the capital Valletta when it was rebuilt after being damaged in a gunpowder magazine explosion in 1634, and he also redesigned Valletta's Church of St Nicholas and the Church of St Paul in Rabat. He also worked on other civil construction projects, but he does not seem to have been involved in the design and construction of fortifications which was taking place during his stay in Malta. Buonamici was also an engraver, and he produced the title page of Della Descrittione di Malta by Giovanni Francesco Abela in 1647.

While he was living in Malta, he occasionally worked in nearby Sicily, and he designed or made alterations to various buildings in Syracuse, Palermo, Messina and Trapani. He is known to have visited Syracuse to work for bishop Giovanni Antonio Capobianco in 1650 and 1651. Buonamici left Malta in 1659 and returned to Lucca, where he was appointed as the city's architetto primario. He was involved in the internal remodelling of Church of San Romano which was carried out between 1661 and 1666, although his exact role is unclear. Buonamici died on 26 June 1677 at the age of 81 and he was buried at the Suffragio church in Lucca.

It is sometimes believed that Buonamici was the father of Giovan Francesco Bonamico, who was born in Malta in 1639, but no documentary evidence supports this.

== Works ==
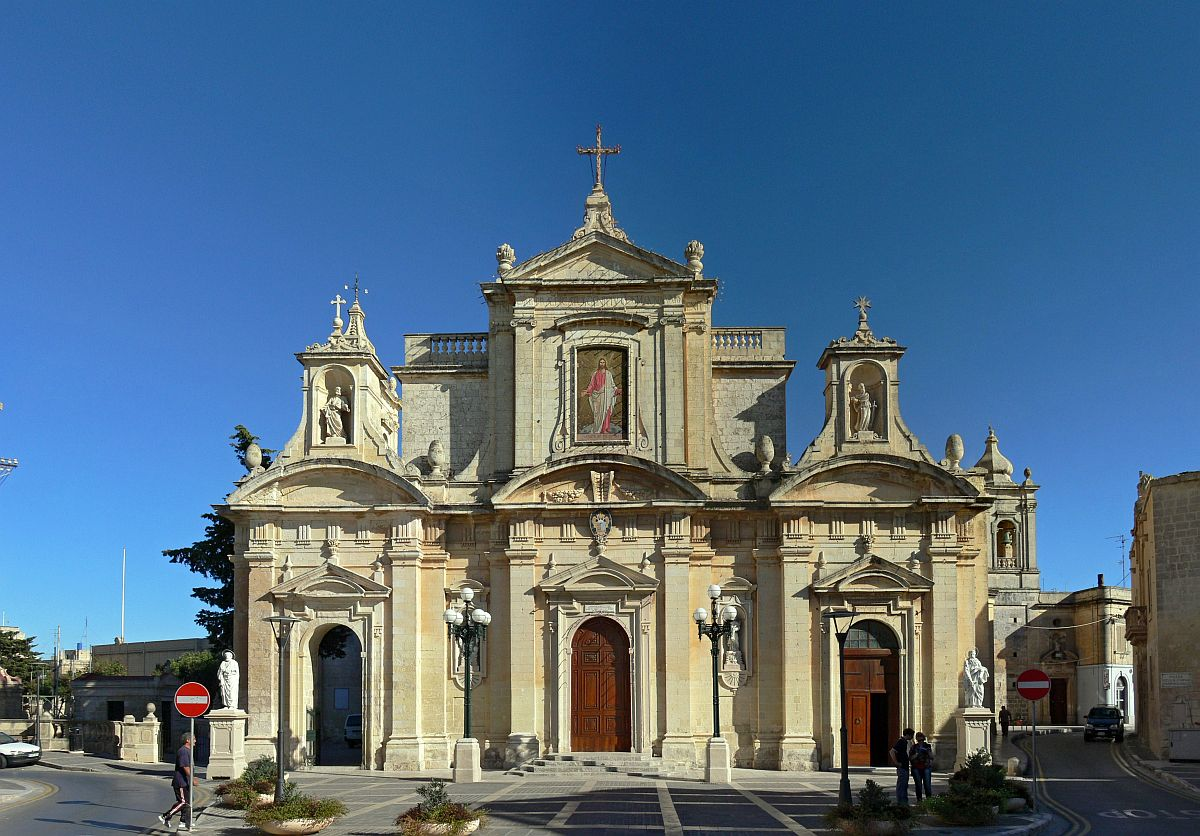
Church of St Paul, Rabat

Buildings known to have been designed by Buonamici include:

- Church of the Suffragio, Lucca
- Church of the Jesuits, Valletta
- Church of St Nicholas, Valletta
- Hostel de Verdelin, Valletta (attributed)
- Monte di Pietà, Valletta (attributed)
- Triumphal arch and fountains at Ġnien is-Sultan, Valletta
- Church of St Paul, Rabat (completed by Lorenzo Gafà)
- Alterations to the palace of Giovanni Antonio Capobianco, Syracuse
- Cappella del Santissimo Sacramento, Cathedral of Syracuse
- Church of Santa Maria della Concezione, Syracuse (designed by a Michelangelo Bonamici, possibly a reference to Francesco Buonamici or a relative)
- Courtyard of the Collegio Massimo dei Gesuiti, Palermo
- Façade of the Chiesa del collegio dei Gesuiti, Trapani
- Interior of the Church of San Giovanni di Malta, Messina
