= Church of St Nicholas, Valletta =

Orthodox Church of Saint Nicholas
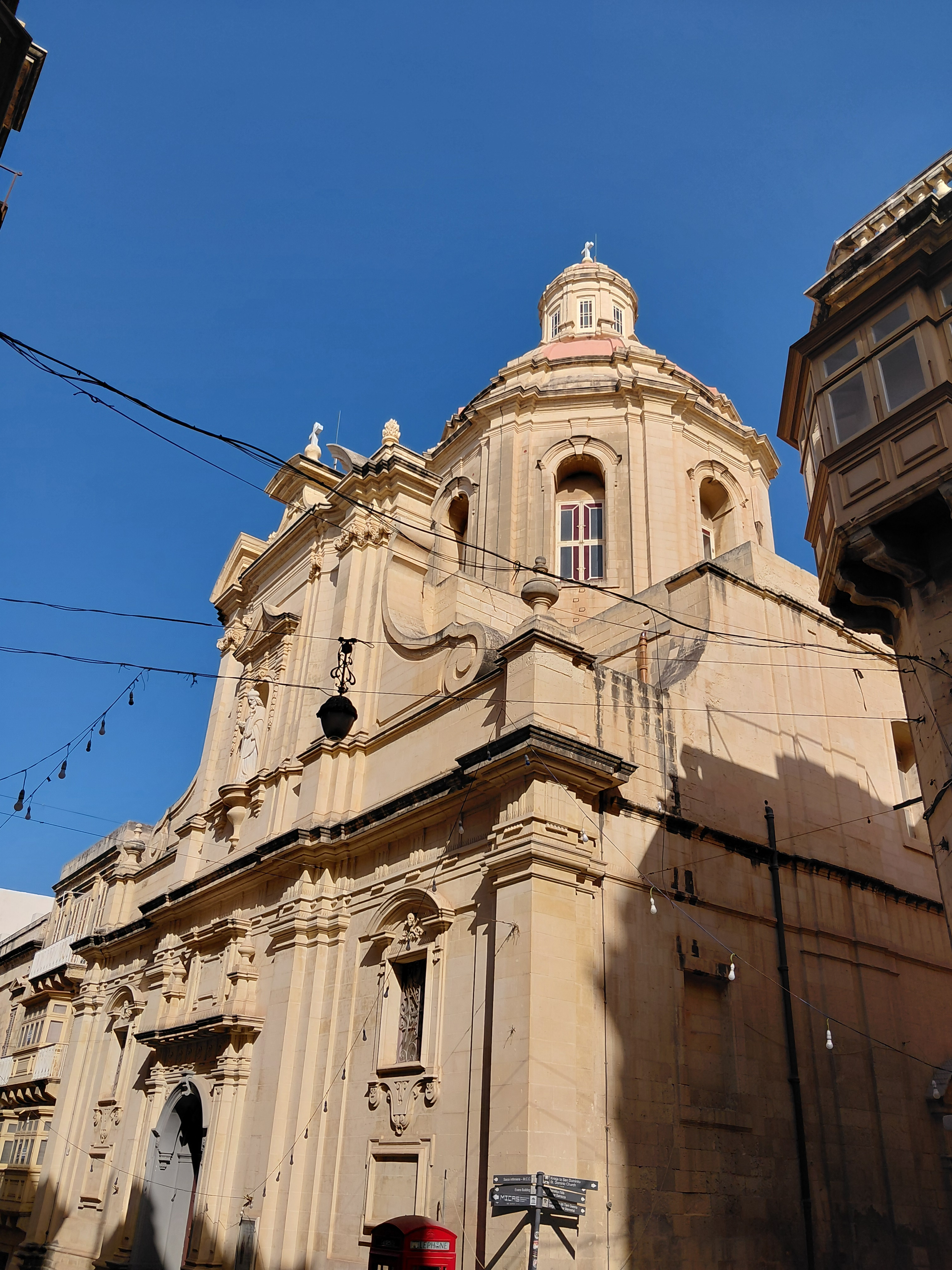
- Façade of the Church of St. Nicholas
- Orthodox Church of Saint Nicholas
- 35°53′58.3″N 14°31′0.5″E
- Location: Valletta, Malta
- Country: Malta
- Denomination: Eastern Orthodox Church

History
- Status: Church

Architecture
- Functional status: Active
- Architect: Francesco Buonamici
- Style: Baroque

Specifications
- Materials: Limestone

The Orthodox Church of Saint Nicholas (Maltese: Il-Knisja ta' San Nikola, Greek: Εκκλησία του Αγίου Νικολάου, is a Greek Orthodox church in Valletta, Malta, dedicated to Saint Nicholas. Originally built as a Greek Orthodox church in 1569, it was conceded to the Confraternity of the Souls in Purgatory in 1639, who rebuilt the church in the Baroque style in 1652. As of 2021, the church is used by the Holy Patriarchal Exarchate Ecumenical Patriarchate of Constantinople, led by Kyrillos (Katerelos) Metropolitan Bishop of Krini and Exarch of Malta. The church has a Greek and Ukrainian Parish.

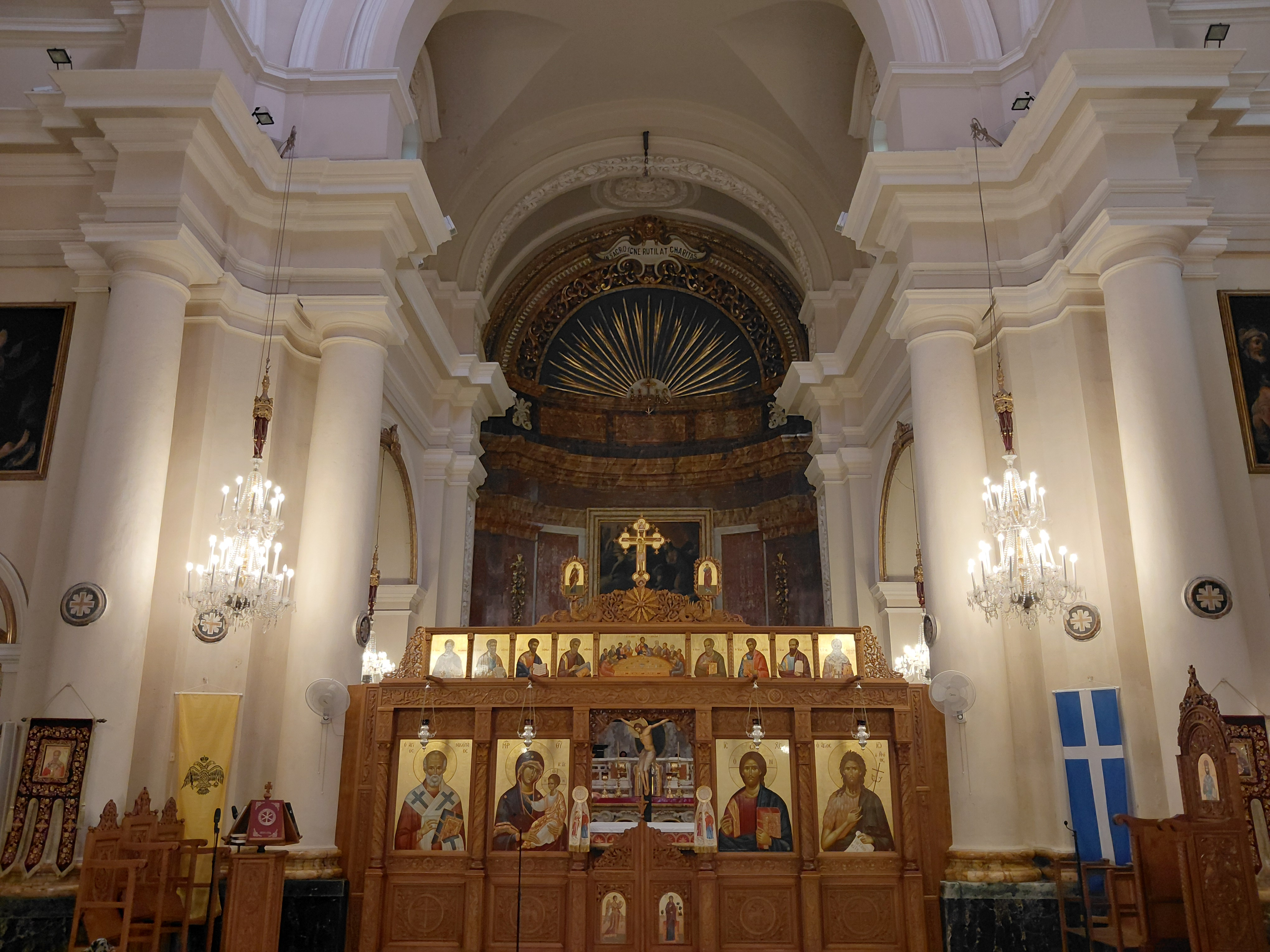
Interior of Saint Nicolaos Greek Orthodox Church.

== Ecclesiastical Status ==
The Orthodox Church of Saint Nicholas in Valletta is part of the Eastern Orthodox Church, under the jurisdiction of the Ecumenical Patriarchate of Constantinople. It operates within the Holy Patriarchal Exarchate of Malta, the ecclesiastical structure established to serve Orthodox parishes in the Maltese islands.

The church hosts two parish communities:

- The Greek Orthodox Parish, which offers services in Greek and English, is led by Archimandrite Nikólaos Gongádze, a resident priest of the Exarchate.
- The Ukrainian Orthodox Parish, which offers services in Ukrainian, is led by Hieromonk Andreas Kravchenko, also resident at the church.

Both parishes share the church building and collaborate in maintaining the liturgical, pastoral, and sacramental life of the Orthodox Christian community in Malta.

The Exarchate is headed by His Eminence Kyrillos Katerelos, the Patriarchal Exarch of Malta, who provides spiritual oversight and canonical authority on behalf of the Ecumenical Patriarchate.

== History ==
The Church of St. Nicholas was originally constructed in 1569 to serve the Greek Orthodox community in Malta. In 1639, the parish priest, Papas Giovanni Metaxi, joined the Greek Catholic Church, placing the church under the care of the Confraternity of the Souls in Purgatory. In 1652, the church was completely rebuilt in the Baroque style by the Italian architect Francesco Buonamici.

During World War II, the church sustained considerable damage from aerial bombardment. It was repaired and restored by 1951, including a full reconstruction of the façade.

Although the church was formally returned to the Greek Catholic community in 2014, it was later entrusted to the Ecumenical Patriarchate of Constantinople, reflecting a renewed Orthodox presence in Malta. On 14 January 2021, the Holy Synod of the Ecumenical Patriarchate established the Holy Patriarchal Exarchate of Malta as a separate jurisdiction from the Orthodox Archdiocese of Italy, in order to better serve the Orthodox faithful on the islands. Kyrillos Katerelos was appointed as the first Patriarchal Exarch of Malta, assuming responsibility for the spiritual and administrative oversight of the Orthodox Church in the country.

From 4 to 7 December 2022, His All-Holiness Bartholomew I, Ecumenical Patriarch of Constantinople, made a historic official visit to Malta—the first ever by a reigning Ecumenical Patriarch. On 5 December, he presided over Great Vespers for the feast of Saint Nicholas at the Church of St. Nicholas in Valletta. The service was attended by local clergy, including Archbishop Charles Scicluna of Malta, and members of both the Greek and Ukrainian Orthodox parishes. During the visit, Patriarch Bartholomew also met with President George Vella and Minister for Foreign Affairs Ian Borg to discuss interreligious dialogue, the Orthodox diaspora, and regional cooperation.

== Architecture ==
The Orthodox Church of St. Nicholas is built in the Baroque style. Its façade is divided into three bays at ground level, with a single central bay on the upper part. The church has a Greek cross plan, with a central dome over the crossing supported by four free-standing columns. It has a choir in the apse, which is flanked by a small sacristy. The church has a single bell tower which is located to the rear of the building.

== See also ==
- Culture of Malta
- History of Malta
- List of churches in Malta
- Religion in Malta
