= Lorenzo Gafà =

Maltese architect (1639–1703)

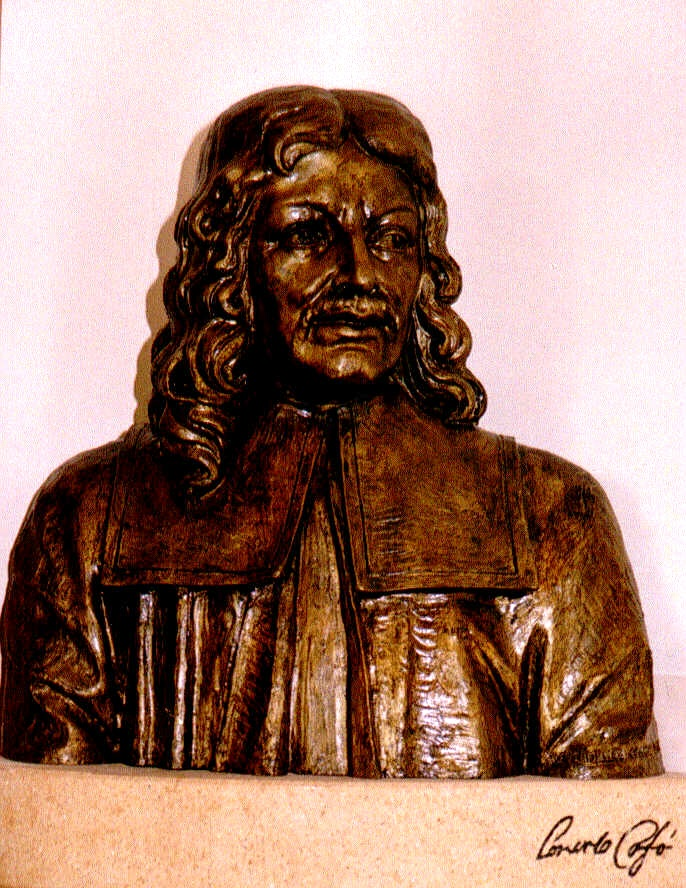
- Bust of Lorenzo Gafà, possibly by his brother Melchiorre
- Born: 1639; Birgu, Malta
- Died: 16 February 1703 (aged 64)
- Occupation: Architect
- Notable work: St. Paul's Cathedral, Mdina and many other churches
- Style: Baroque
- Parents: Marco Gafà (father); Veronica Gafà (mother)
- Relatives: Melchiorre Cafà (brother)

Lorenzo Gafà (1639–1703) was a Maltese Baroque architect and sculptor. He designed many churches in the Maltese Islands, including St. Paul's Cathedral in Mdina and the Cathedral of the Assumption in Victoria, Gozo. He was the younger brother of the sculptor Melchiorre Cafà.

== Life and works ==
=== Main ===
Gafà was born in 1639 in Birgu, to the stone carver Marco Gafà and his wife Veronica. He began his working life as a stone carver with his father and his older brother Melchiorre, who became a renowned sculptor. He might have studied architecture in Rome, although there is no documentary evidence that he ever left Malta. It is possible that Gafà was an apprentice of the Italian architect Francesco Buonamici while the latter lived in Malta.

By the early 1660s he had developed a strong interest in architectural design and in 1661 is known to have been involved in the choir of the Church of St. Philip in Żebbuġ. Sometime before 1666, he worked on the reredos of the main altar in the church of Sta Scolastica and in the Dominican church of the Annunciation, both in his native town of Birgu. He is also known to have designed the altar of the Church of St. Nicholas in Valletta. He also designed or was involved in the construction of the following churches:

- Church of St. Paul, Rabat (1664–83)
- Church of St. Paul's Shipwreck, Valletta (1666–80)
- Carmelite Church, Mdina (1668–72)
- Sarria Church, Floriana (1676)
- Church of St. Nicholas, Siġġiewi (1676–93)
- Monastery of St Scholastica, Birgu (1679)
- Church of St. Roque, Valletta (c. 1680)
- Church of St. Lawrence, Birgu (1681–97)
- Church of St. Peter the Martyr, Marsaxlokk (1682)
- Dome of the Church of St. George, Qormi (1684)
- Church of St. Mary, Qrendi (1685–1712)
- Tal-Ħlas Church, Qormi (1690)
- Church of St. Catherine, Żejtun (1692–1744)
- Church of the Holy Spirit, Żejtun (1688)
- Cathedral of the Assumption, Victoria, Gozo (1697–1711)
- Enlarging of the Church of Our Lady of Victories, Valletta (1699)
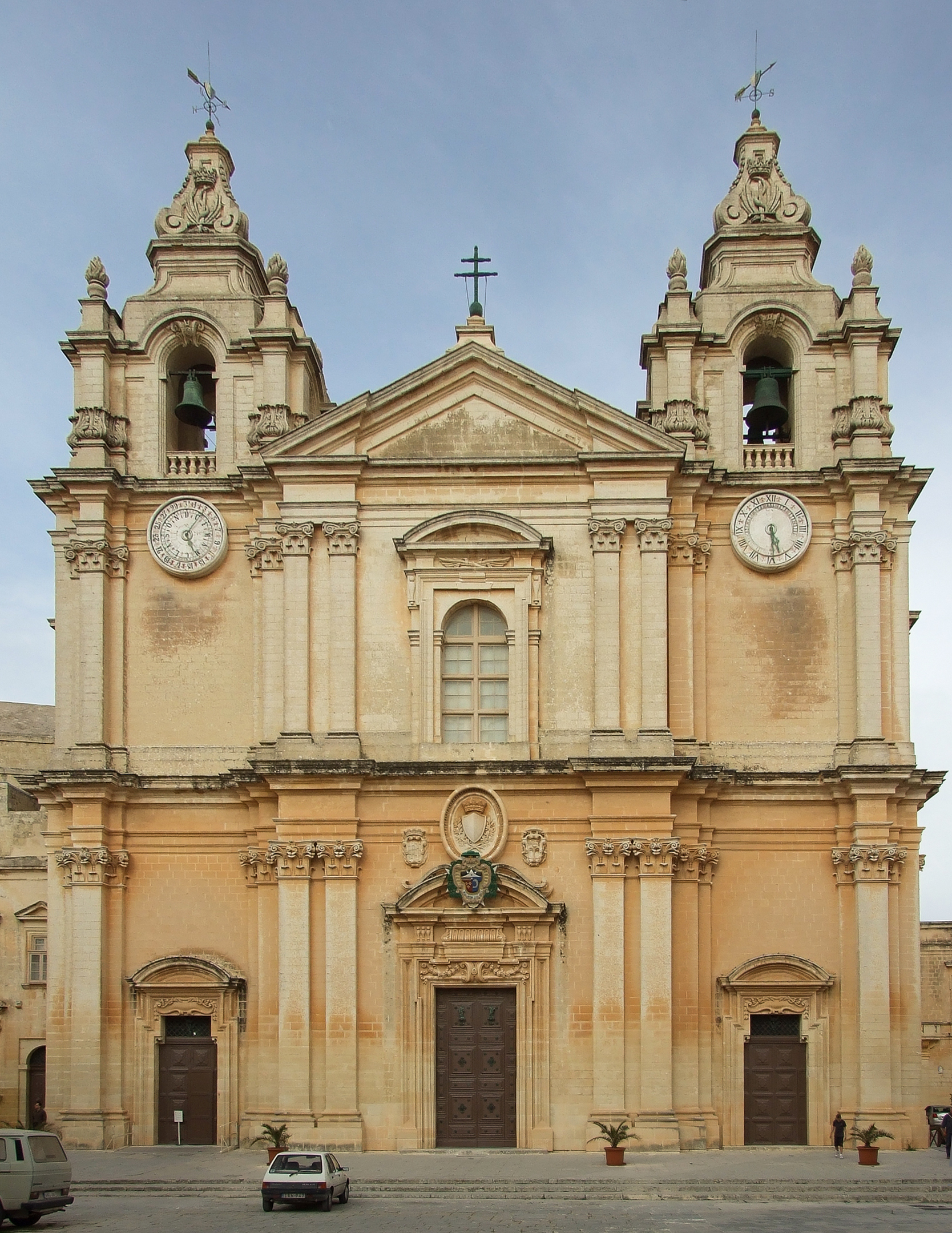
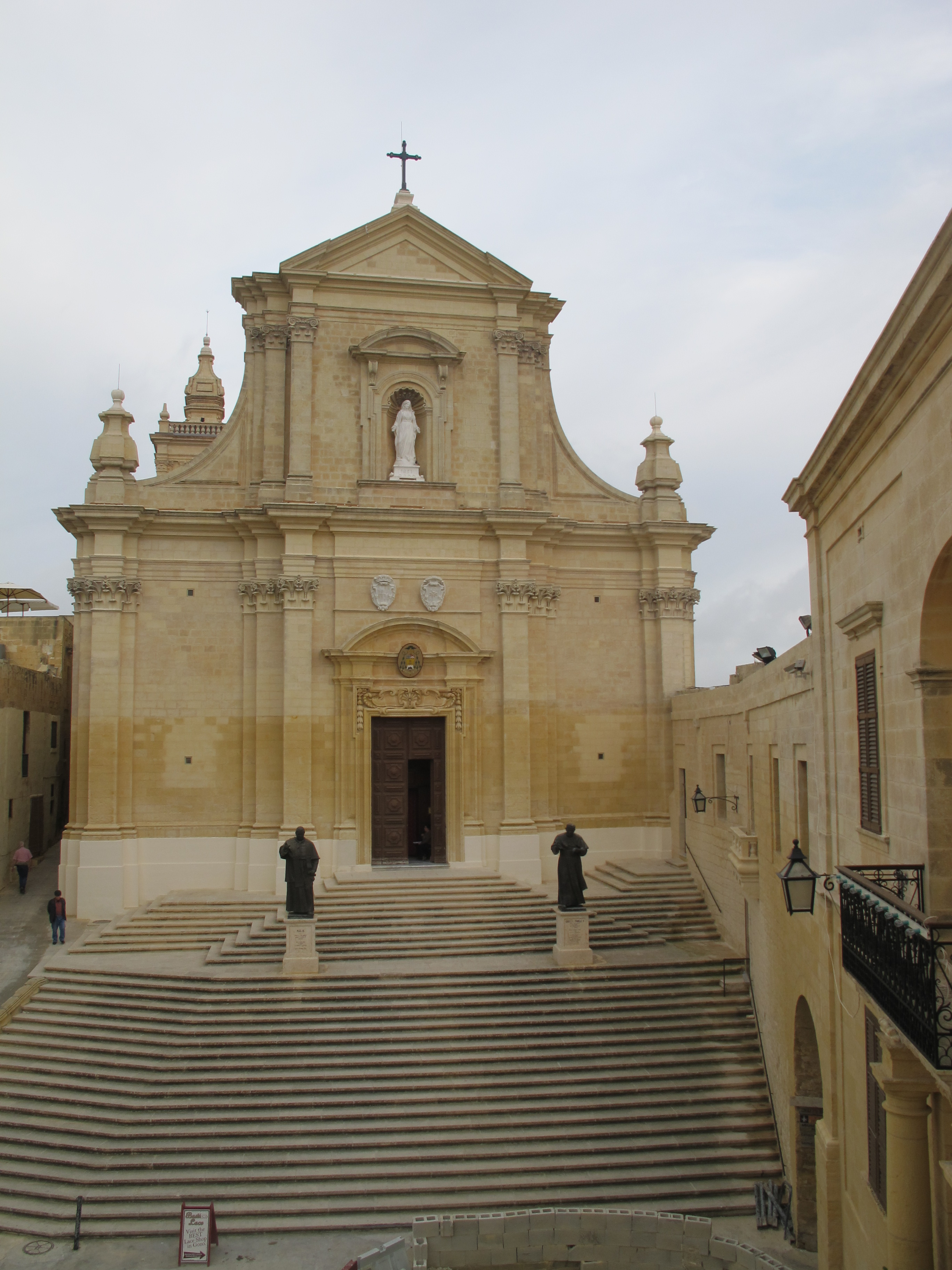
St. Paul's Cathedral in Mdina and the Cathedral of the Assumption in Victoria, Gozo, which were designed by Gafà in the late 17th and early 18th centuries

=== Attributed ===
Some sources also state that Gafà was involved in the construction of the Church of St. Catherine in Żurrieq (1632–55), the Church of Our Saviour in Kalkara (1650), the Church of St. Mary in Żebbuġ (1683), the Church of the Holy Spirit in Żejtun (1688), the Church of the Holy Spirit in Mdina (1688), the choir of the Church of the Nativity of Mary in Naxxar (1691), the Church of the Annunciation in Tarxien (1692), the Church of St. Nicholas in Mdina (1692), the Church of St. Agatha in Mdina (1694) and the Church of St. Julian in Senglea (1696).

=== Other ===
In 1679, Gafà designed and oversaw the construction of the choir of St. Paul's Cathedral in Mdina, and he later designed the Bishop's Palace. The cathedral was partially destroyed a few years later during the 1693 Sicily earthquake, although the newly built choir remained intact. The old cathedral was dismantled, and between 1696 and 1705 a new cathedral was built to Gafà's Baroque designs. The cathedral was consecrated on 8 October 1702, and it is regarded as Gafà's masterpiece.

Gafà also designed some secular buildings, including Villa Bichi (1675), the palace of the General of the Galleys in Birgu (before 1695) and possibly the Ta' Saura hospital in Rabat (1655).

Gafà died on 16 February 1703 at the age of 64.
