= Hostel de Verdelin =

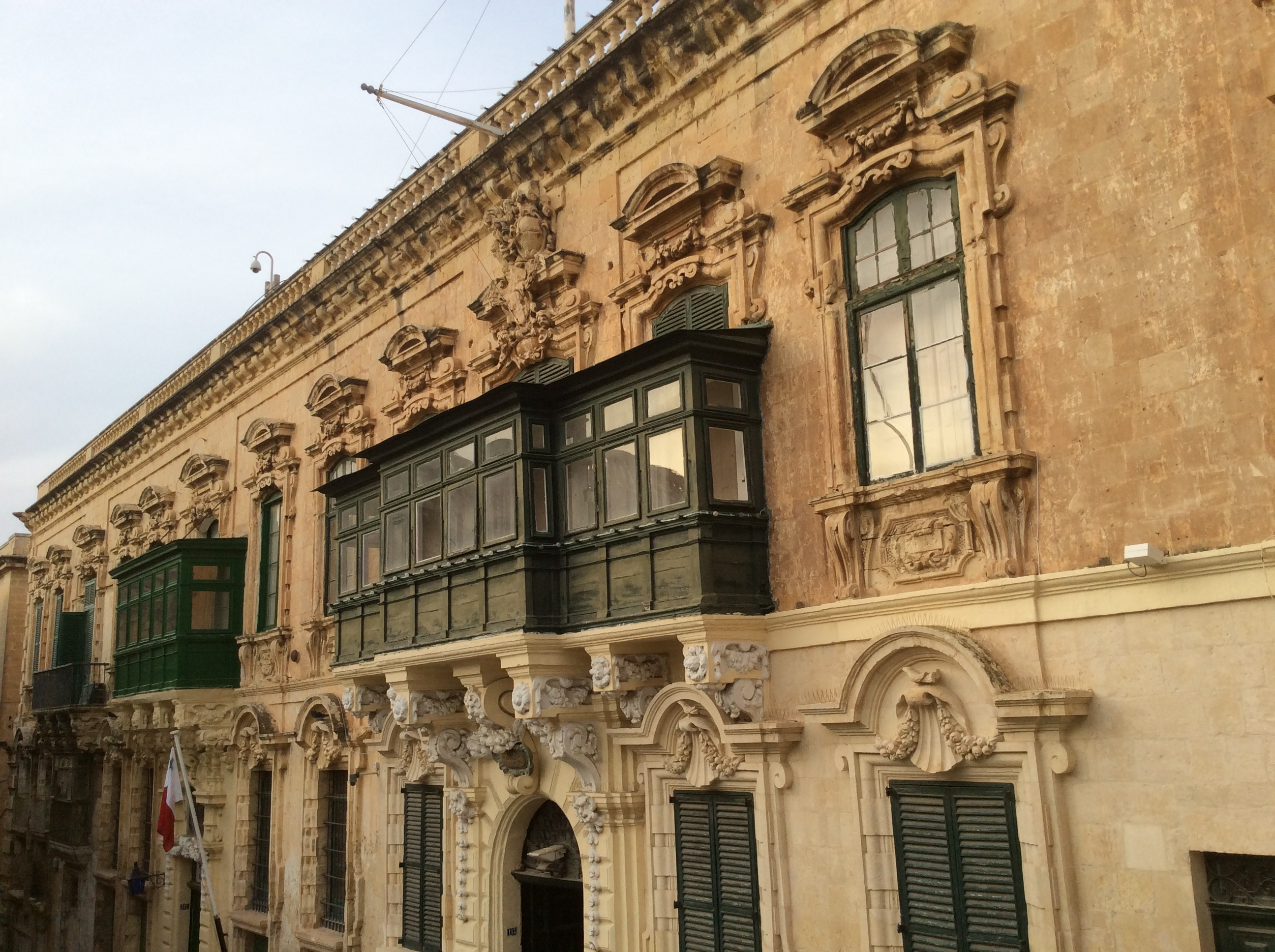
- Façade of the Hostel de Verdelin
- Interactive map of Hostel de Verdelin
- Alternative names: Palazzo Verdelin; Casa delle Colombe

General information
- Status: Intact
- Type: Palace
- Architectural style: Siculo-Spanish Baroque
- Location: Nos. 108–114 Archbishop Street, Valletta, Malta
- Coordinates: 35°53′58.1″N 14°30′50.4″E
- Current tenants: Police Department
- Named for: Jean-Jacques de Verdelin
- Completed: c. 1650s or 1660s
- Owner: 12 private owners

Technical details
- Material: Limestone
- Floor count: 2

Design and construction
- Architect: Francesco Buonamici (attributed)

The Hostel de Verdelin, also known as Palazzo Verdelin or the Casa delle Colombe, is a palace in Valletta, Malta. It was built in the mid-17th century for the knight Jean-Jacques de Verdelin, and it is an early example of Baroque architecture in Malta. The palace currently houses a police station and a restaurant.

== History ==
The Hostel de Verdelin was built in around the 1650s (some sources claim it was built in the 1660s, such as 1662 or 1666, but in 1662 the premises were already handed over to Paul de Verdelin from the original owner) for Jean-Jacques de Verdelin, a French knight of the Order of St. John who was the nephew of Hugues Loubenx de Verdalle and who held a number of important positions, including Commander of the Artillery, Auditor of Accounts and Grand Commander. The palace is attributed to the Italian architect Francesco Buonamici, who is sometimes credited for introducing Baroque architecture in Malta.

Following Verdelin's death in 1678, the palace was inherited by his brother Jean-François de Verdelin, who was also a knight. It subsequently became property of the Order, and it was used as a hostel. It was transferred to the government during the French occupation of Malta in 1798, and at this point, two coats of arms on the façade were defaced.

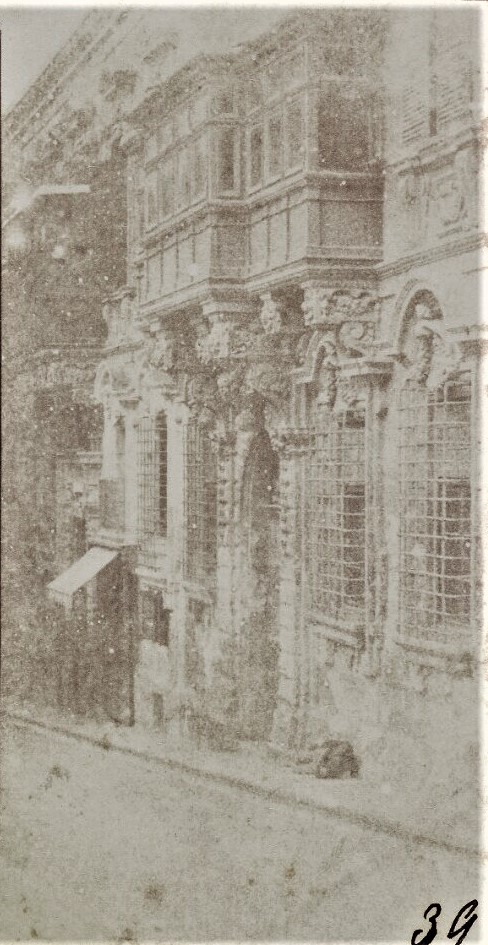
The building in 1846

The prominent part of the building seen from St George Square housed the Vicary's Hotel during the British period, which was one of the first hotels in Malta. The building subsequently housed the Civil Service Sports Club. For some years it hosted the Circle known as La Giovane Malta.

The other part of the building was leased to the government in 1962. Before that, it had housed the Banco di Roma and the Malta Government Savings Bank. It was then converted into a police station.

The building's façade was included on the Antiquities List of 1925.

The palace currently belongs to 12 private owners, including Marco Gaffarena, the heirs of Antonio Zammit and the firm B. Tagliaferro and Sons Ltd. The owners have been demanding that the property be vacated since October 2014. Part of the building housed a restaurant called Michael's for a period of about two years around 2014. It now houses a restaurant named Gracy's.

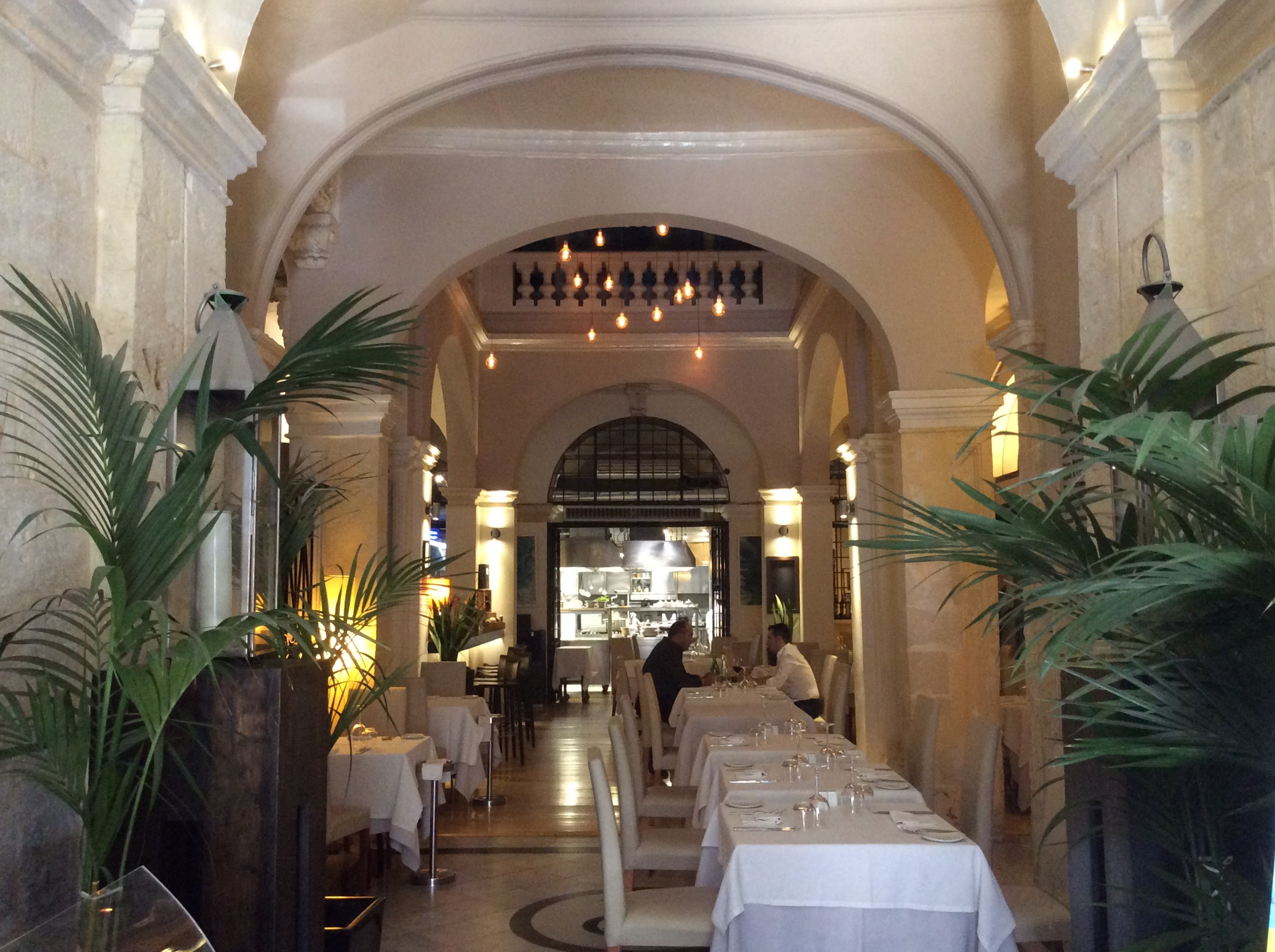
The Civil Service Sports Club, here shown when it hosted Michael's restaurant.

During the Gaffarena scandal in 2015, journalist Caroline Muscat revealed that the government gave Gaffarena €1.65 million in land and cash for his part ownership of another palace in Valletta, the opposition accused the government that it also intended to expropriate the Hotel de Verdelin. These claims were denied by home affairs minister Carmelo Abela, although it was later revealed that the Land Department had sent architects to draw up a valuation report of the palace between February and April 2015.

The palace is scheduled as a Grade 1 national monument by the Malta Environment and Planning Authority. It was restored between September and December 2017.

== Architecture ==
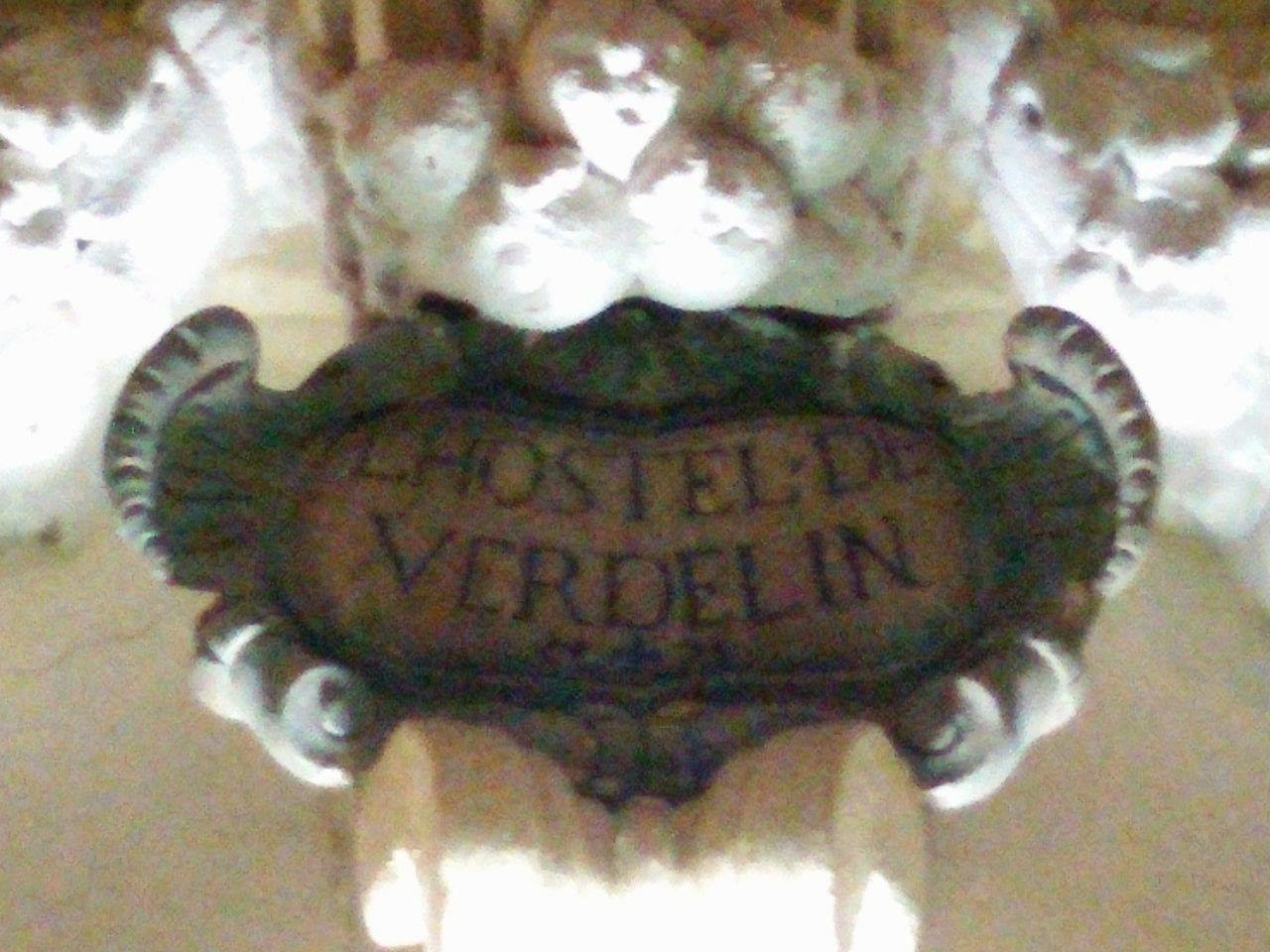
L' Hostel de Verdelin inscription

The Hostel de Verdelin is an early example of Baroque architecture in Malta. Its ornate façade has significant influences from the Spanish Baroque style, which is unusual in Malta, where Italian and French Baroque are more common. Its façade is said to be one of the finest in Valletta and described as being an impressive example of artistic fabric in urban Malta. The ornate windows are the centerpiece of the façade. In the 19th century, during the British period, closed timber balconies replaced earlier structure that originally consisted of stone balconies. An artistic interpretation of de Verdelin in form of a painting is found within the building. The palace is the largest of three adjacent buildings which belonged to Verdelin.

== See also ==
- List of Baroque residences
