= Ajaccio Cathedral =

Church in Ajaccio, France

Cathedral of Our Lady of the Assumption of Ajaccio
- Cathédrale Notre-Dame de l'Assomption de Ajaccio (in French)
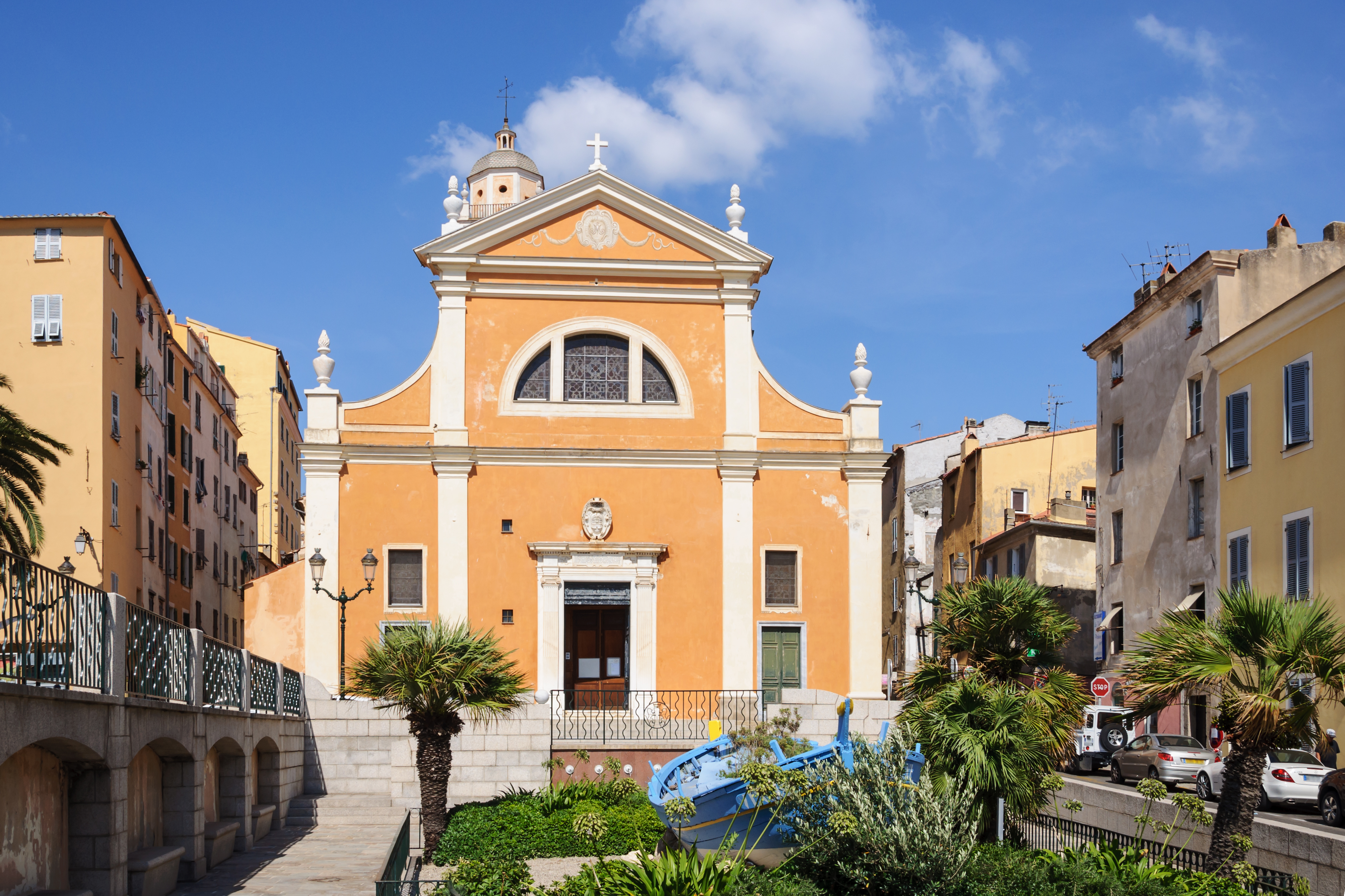
- Ajaccio Cathedral

Religion
- Affiliation: Roman Catholic Church
- Rite: Roman
- Leadership: Bishop of Ajaccio and suffragan of the Archdiocese of Marseille
- Year consecrated: 1593

Location
- Location: Ajaccio, Corsica, France
- Interactive map of Cathedral of Our Lady of the Assumption of Ajaccio
- Coordinates: 41°55′02″N 08°44′16″E

Architecture
- Architect: Giacomo della Porta
- Type: Church
- Style: Baroque, Mannerist
- Groundbreaking: 1577
- Completed: 1593
- Direction of façade: Southwest

Website
- www.ajaccio.fr/Monuments-et-architectures_a11.html

Ajaccio Cathedral, officially the Cathedral of Our Lady of the Assumption of Ajaccio (French: Cathédrale Notre-Dame de l'Assomption de Ajaccio) and also known as the Cathedral of the Assumption of Saint Mary (French: Cathédrale de l'Assomption de Sainte-Marie), is a Roman Catholic church located in Ajaccio, Corsica. The cathedral is the ecclesiastical seat of the Bishop of Ajaccio, a suffragan of the Archdiocese of Marseille. It is dedicated to the Virgin Mary, and is in the Baroque/Mannerist architectural style.

== History ==
The present cathedral was built between 1577 and 1593 and is attributed to Italian architect Giacomo della Porta. It was built to replace the former Cathedral of Saint-Croix, destroyed in 1553 in order to make room for developments in the city's defenses, as stated in the permit required by the Council of Ancients in 1559 to the Senate of Genoa and Pope Gregory XIII in order to build a new cathedral. The final stone was laid in 1593 by Giulio Giustiniani, made bishop by Pope Sixtus V. It is where Napoleon Bonaparte was baptised on 21 July 1771 and he recited the following on his deathbed in Saint Helena in 1821: "If they forbid my corpse, as they have forbidden my body, deny me a small piece of land in which to be buried, I wish to be buried with my ancestors in Ajaccio Cathedral in Corsica."

The cathedral has been a monument historique (a national heritage site of France) since 30 October 1906.

According to legend, on 15 August 1769 which was also the feast of the Assumption, Letizia Buonaparte felt sudden and severe labour pains while in the cathedral for mass. She rushed home to the Buonaparte's home, just steps away, and gave birth to Napoleon on a first floor sofa before she could reach her bedroom upstairs.

== Architecture ==
=== Exterior ===
Ajaccio Cathedral is built in the style of the Counter-Reformation with an ocher Baroque façade.

=== Interior ===
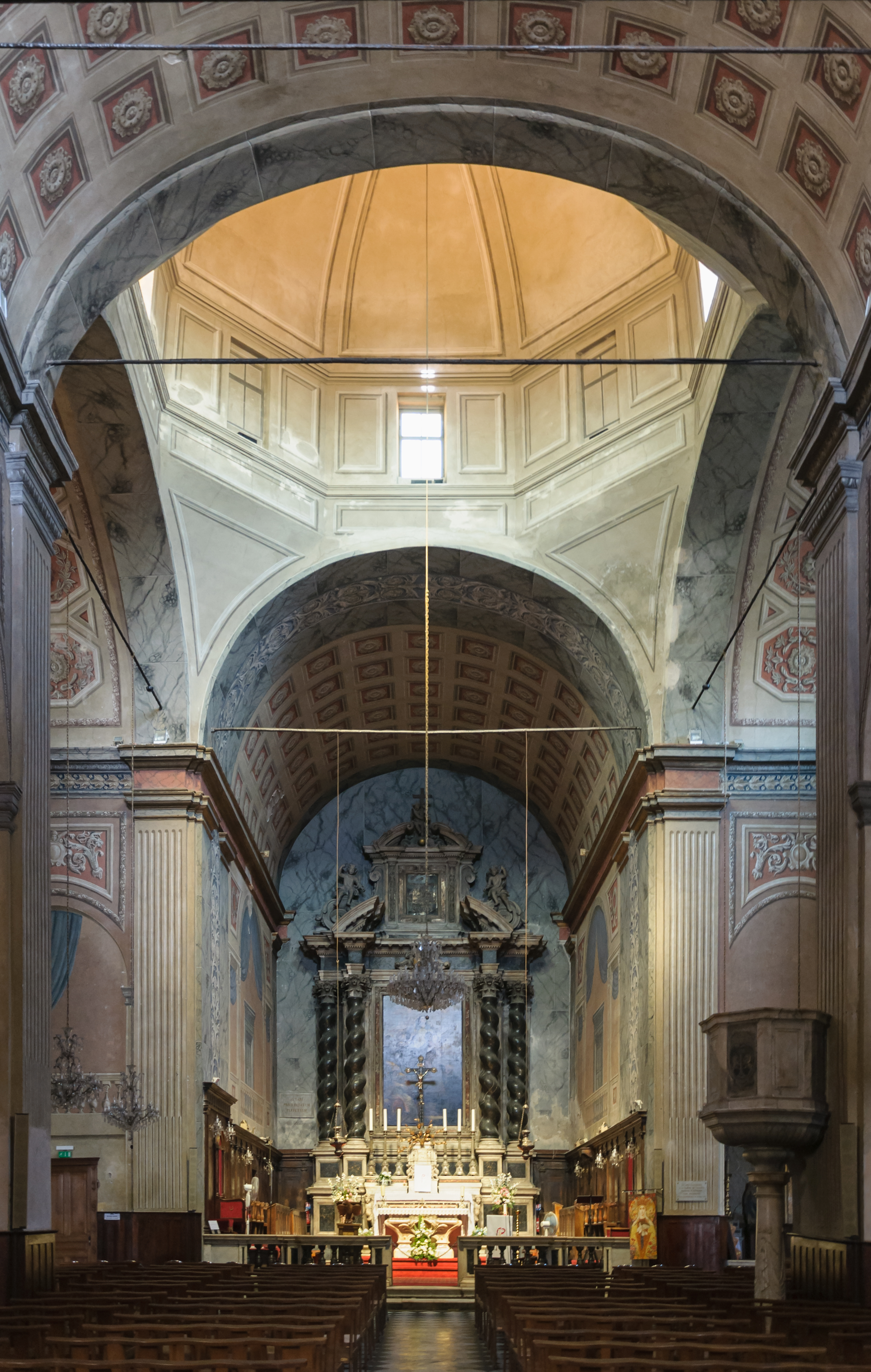
Inside view of the nave and of the choir

The present cathedral is smaller than its predecessor. The interior's Latin cross is delineated by the shallow and modestly-sized transept, which is covered by a dome. The central nave is very high and wide itself, but is short in length compared to the rest of the building. It is covered with barrel vault arches reminiscent of the Renaissance era. The building also has two aisles that depart from the front door and go up to the transept, separated in the middle by the seven chapels beside two rows of three columns.

Entering on the right is the marble baptismal font. It is a simple bowl engraved with Giustiniani's coat of arms, surmounted by a Tuscan bronze crown, below which there is a gold inscription, Heic baptisatus Magnus Imperator (Latin for Here is baptised the Great Emperor).

The altar is in polychrome marble, and it was originally located at the Church of the Suffragio in Lucca but was given to the cathedral by Elisa Bonaparte, Napoleon's sister in 1809. It has an altarpiece composed of four twisted columns of black marble from Porto Venere. The Corinthian orders have a double pedestal with a collection of marble. The tabernacle dates from the time of the construction of the cathedral and originally stood at the baptismal font. It was then placed at the high altar and stands out for its unorthodox style.

Ajaccio Cathedral has seven side chapels, but the following three are the most prominent:

- The Chapel of Our Lady of Mercy (French: Chapelle de la Vierge de la Miséricorde) is a 1752 chapel in honor of the Virgin of Mercy is dedicated to the patron saint of Ajaccio, the Virgin Mary. It has a marble altar designed by Geonese sculptors decorated with spiral Brocatello marble from Spain.
- The Chapel of Our Lady of the Rosary (French: Chapelle de Notre-Dame du Rosaire) is a 1765 chapel that houses a stucco altar and series of boxes representing the Glorious, Joyful, Luminous and Sorrowful Mysteries of the Rosary of the Virgin, a central niche with the statue of the Virgin Mary and two side niches containing statues of Saint Dominic and Saint Catherine of Siena.
- The Chapel of the Madonna of Pianto (French: Chapelle de la Madonna de Pianto) is a small 18th-century chapel that contains many murals by Domenico Tintoretto and Eugène Delacroix's The Triumph of Religion.

The cathedral also houses a large pipe organ built in 1849 by Aristide Cavaillé-Coll and later restored and electrified by Joël Pétrique.
