= Monastery of St Scholastica =

Church building in Birgu, Malta

Coordinates: 35.8889°N 14.5223°E

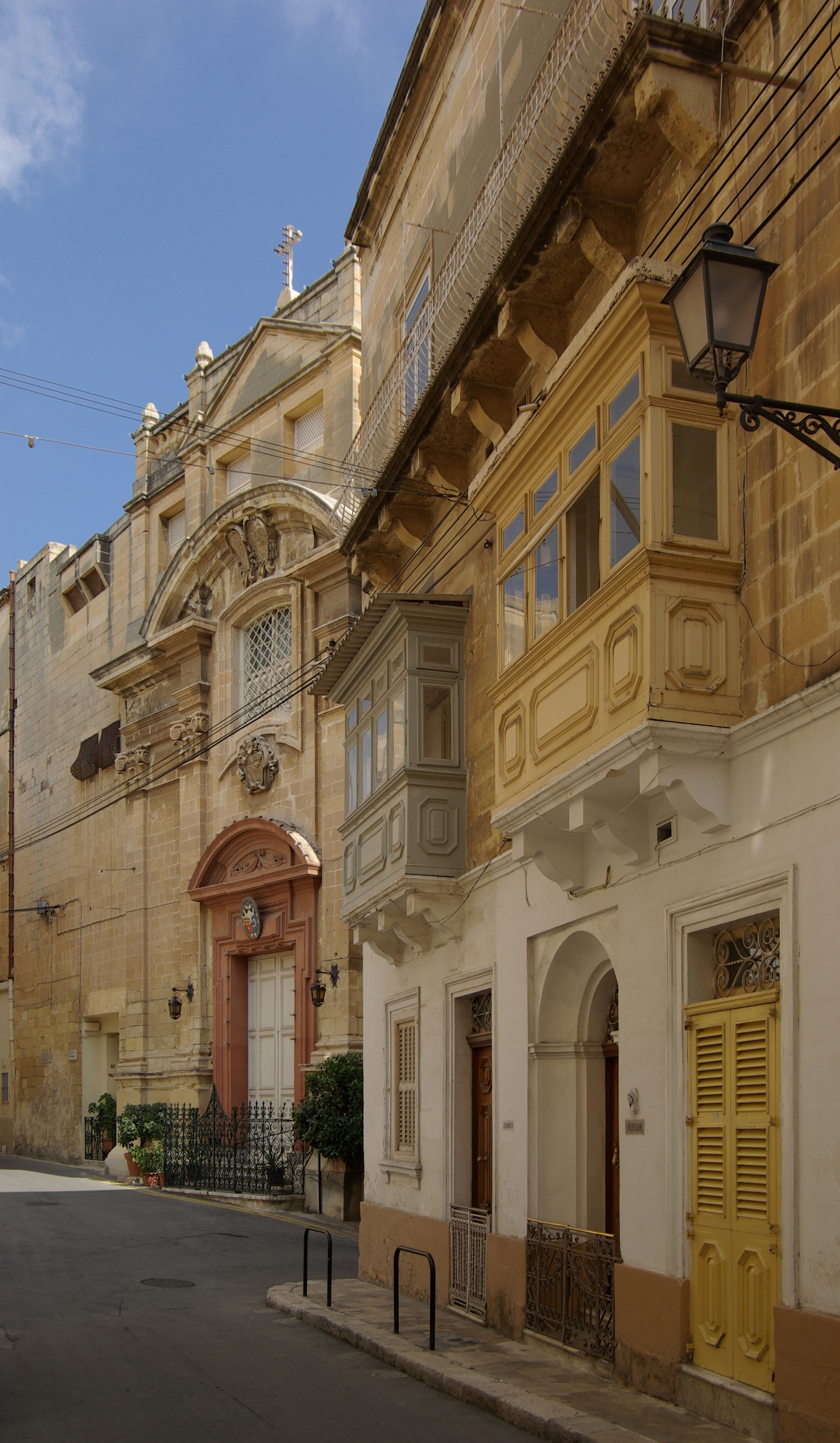
Monastery of St. Scholastica

The Monastery of St. Scholastica is a monastery in Birgu, Malta. The monastery is dedicated to St Scholastica, but the church is dedicated to St Anne. The church was built in 1679 by Lorenzo Gafà.

== History ==
The order of Benedictine nuns who occupy the monastery was established in 1496, by Bishop Jaime Valgernera, a devotee of St Scholastica. The monastery was originally located in Mdina. The order was moved to Birgu in 1604 and a monastery established in the Magisterial Palace. In 1652 due to the growing size of the order, they requested that the monastery move to larger premises, former Sacra Infermeria (a hospital of the Order of St John of Jerusalem, established in 1532). It is here that the monastery remains to this day.

Thanks to the benefaction of Lady Aloisietta Dorel Pecos, the church attached to the monastery which is dedicated to St Anne was built, with construction beginning in 1679. The building was designed by Lorenzo Gafà, with Bishop Jerónimo de Molina laying the first stone. It was blessed on 14 July 1680, but not consecrated until 29 September 1787. A belfry was added in 1694, and a presbytery in 1748.

During the Second World War the order relocated to Mdina due to heavy bombing. They also relocated to Mdina between 1798 and 1800 due to French rule.

The monastery and church are listed on the National Inventory of the Cultural Property of the Maltese Islands.

== See also ==
- Culture of Malta
- History of Malta
- List of Churches in Malta
- Religion in Malta
