= Church of the Suffragio, Lucca =

Church of the Suffragio
- Chiesa del Suffragio
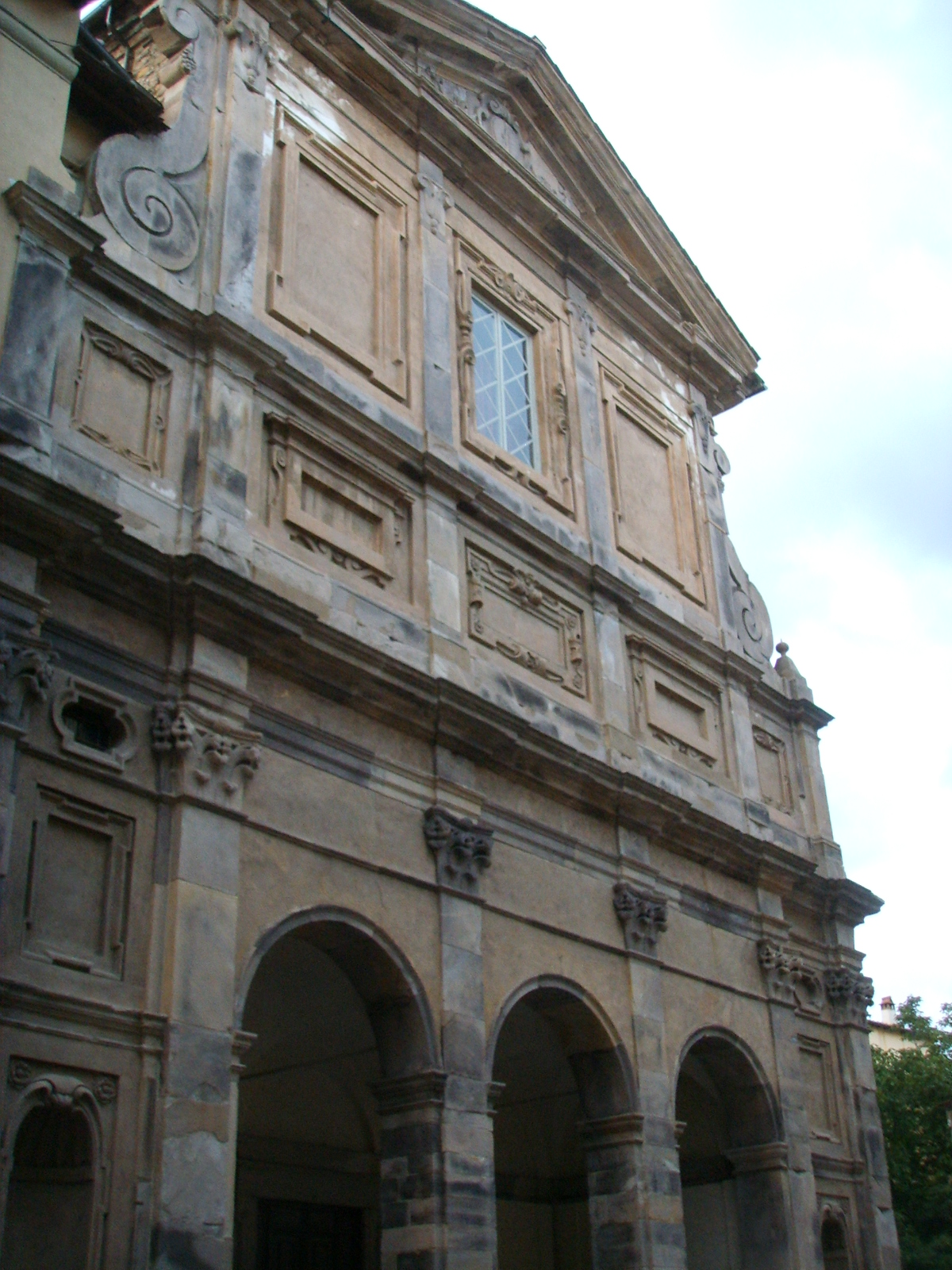
- The church's façade in 2007
- Church of the Suffragio
- 43°50′34.8″N 10°30′22.5″E
- Location: Lucca, Tuscany, Italy
- Denomination: Roman Catholic

History
- Status: Church
- Consecrated: 1646

Architecture
- Functional status: Deconsecrated
- Architect: Francesco Buonamici
- Years built: 17th century

Administration
- Archdiocese: Lucca

The Church of the Suffragio (Italian: Chiesa del Suffragio) is a former Roman Catholic church in the historic centre of Lucca, Italy. It was built in the 17th century, and it is now used as an auditorium.

== History ==
Construction of the church began in 1632 or 1634 on the site of a cemetery where victims of the plague of 1630–1631 were buried. It was designed by Francesco Buonamici, an architect from Lucca, and it is the only building he designed in his hometown. The church was consecrated in 1646. Buonamici was buried within the church after his death in 1677.

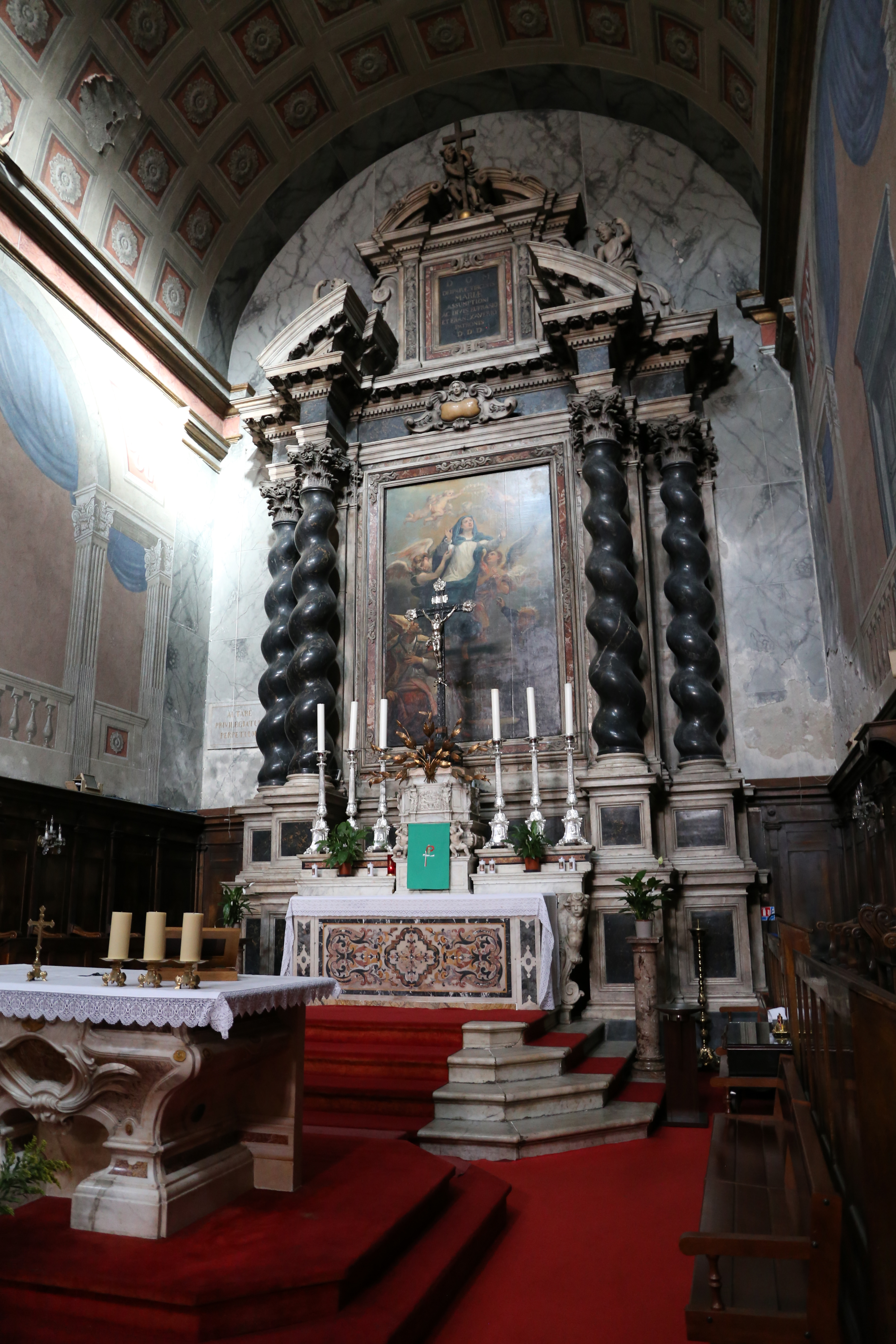
The church's altar, which is now found at Ajaccio Cathedral

The church was fully completed in 1675, when a Baroque altar, which included Solomonic columns, was installed within the building. The altar was removed in 1809 at the request of Elisa Baciocchi, who donated it to Ajaccio Cathedral in Corsica, where it remains today.

The church has been deconsecrated, and it is now used as an auditorium. Restoration works were carried out by Spira Srl at the behest of the Lucca municipality between 2001 and 2002.

== Architecture ==
The church's façade is subdivided into three bays, which are marked by pilasters, and it contains three arches which lead to a vaulted vestibule containing the main entrance. Internally, the church has a single nave with side chapels.
