= Kyrillos Katerelos =

21st-century Eastern Orthodox bishop

His Eminence; Gr. Ο Σεβασμιώτατος Kyrillos, Metropolitan Bishop of Krini and Exarch of Malta
- Metropolitan Bishop of Krini Exarch of Malta (Ecumenical Patriarchate of Constantinople)
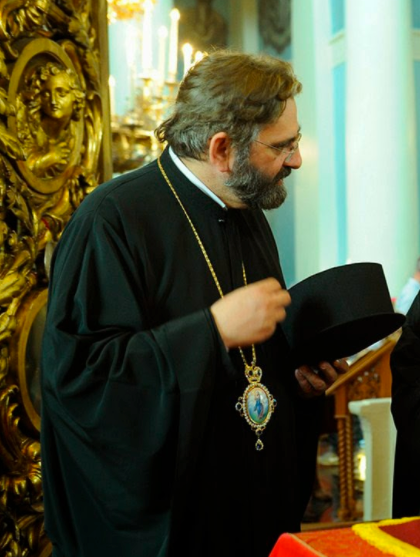
- Kyrillos (Katerelos) Metropolitan Bishop of Krini (2017)
- Church: Ecumenical Patriarchate of Constantinople
- Diocese: Krini
- Elected: February 16, 2021
- Predecessor: See of Krini: Iakovos (Garmatis); See of Abydos: Gerasimos (Papadopoulos)
- Successor: Incumbent
- Other posts: Professor of Theology (University of Athens, Greece); Visiting Professor (Holy Cross Greek Orthodox School of Theology); President Emeritus (Society for the Law of Eastern Churches)

Orders
- Ordination: 1983 (Presbyterate) by Meletios of Nikopolis and Preveza
- Consecration: 2008 (Elected February 7, 2008) by Meletios of Nikopolis and Preveza; Alexios of Nikaia; Irenaeus Myriophytos; Chrysostomos of Myron; Makarios of Siderokastro

Personal details
- Born: Evangelos Katerelos; 21 November 1956 (age 69) Lamia, Greece
- Denomination: Christianity (Eastern Orthodox)
- Residence: Athens, Greece
- Parents: Alexandros and Euphrosyne Katerelos
- Occupation: Monk, Professor, Metropolitan Bishop, Exarch of Malta
- Education: University of Athens (Undergraduate); University of Strasbourg (Masters); University of Freiburg (Doctoral); University of Thessaloniki (Doctoral)

Kyrillos Katerelos (His Eminence Kyrillos, Metropolitan of Krini; Greek: Ο Σεβασμιώτατος Μητροπολίτης Κρήνης Κύριλλος; French: Cyrille; Russian: Кирилл; Born Evangelos Katerelos Greek: Κατερέλος Ευάγγελος, 21 November 1956, Lamia) is the Eastern Orthodox Christian Metropolitan Bishop of Krini (Çesme) and exarch of Malta (Ecumenical Patriarchate of Constantinople). A theologian, church historian, and canonist, he is currently a professor of theology at the University of Athens.

== Education ==
Kyrillos completed his undergraduate studies in law, philology, and theology at the University of Athens. He pursued graduate studies in theology in France and Germany, obtaining a master's degree from the University of Strasbourg (France) and earning a Ph.D. from the University of Freiburg (Germany). Moreover, he earned a second Ph.D. from the University of Thessaloniki, Greece under the direction of Professor Panteleimon (Rodopoulos), Metropolitan Bishop of Tirolois.

Katerelos is a polyglot, fluent in German, French, Italian, Spanish, Russian, Turkish, and English, in addition to his mother tongue, Modern Greek. He also possesses an advanced mastery of Ancient Greek and Latin.

== Pastoral service ==
His pastoral ministry began in Church of Greece in 1983 when Meletios (Kalamaras), Metropolitan Bishop of Nikopolis and Preveza tonsured Katerelos a monk in Preveza, Greece, and shortly thereafter ordained him to the diaconate. He later served the Holy Metropolis of Thebes and Livadeia. Katerelos also served a number of parishes in the Metropolis of Germany, where he was instrumental in the construction of Saints Peter and Paul Greek Orthodox Church in Stuttgart. The Holy Synod of the Ecumenical Patriarchate elected him to bishop of Abydos on February 7, 2008, and elevated him to the episcopacy on February 23, 2008, at the Patriarchal Church of St. George in the Phanar (Istanbul, Turkey). While bishop of Abydos, he served a district of Athenian parishes in a pastoral capacity in addition to his academic projects. On February 16, 2021, the Holy Synod of the Ecumenical Patriarchate elected him Metropolitan of Krini and Exarch of Malta.

== Academic career ==
Katerelos is a tenured professor of theology at the University of Athens, where he holds a full-time academic chair. Additionally, He served as Dean of the Department of Social Theology from 2007 to 2009. In 2015, he was visiting professor of Canon Law at the Holy Cross Greek Orthodox School of Theology in Boston, Massachusetts, where the student body elected him Professor of the Year. In 2016, the Faculty of Theology at Ovidius University of Constanta, Romania awarded him an honorary doctorate.

As of 2017, Katerelos is President Emeritus of the Society for the Law of Eastern Churches, after serving as its president for the better part of a decade.

Katerelos is an international academic authority. He has written several books and articles. His research interests include Historical Dogmatics, Primacy, Theology of Religions, and Liberation Theology.
