= Jerome Leocata =

- Born: c. 1664; Valletta, Hospitaller Malta
- Died: 1745; Valletta, Hospitaller Malta
- Occupation: Philosophy

Jerome Leocata (c. 1664–1745) was a Maltese philosopher who specialised mainly in metaphysics. His long academic career in philosophy and theology was very hampered by his many administrative commitments. His writings, however, bear witness to his thinking skills and his philosophical prowess. He possessed a clear and systematic mind, consistently endeavouring to give a sound philosophical basis to his speculations. No portrait of him is yet known to exist.

== Life ==
Leocata must have been born in 1664 or whereabouts. He most probably hailed from Valletta, Malta, for it was there that he joined the Dominican Order around 1680. He must have been sixteen years of age or perhaps a year or two older. He was still a student ten years later, in 1690, at the studium of the Dominicans at Valletta. In 1694, he was already teaching theology at the same studium

We might somewhat gauge the intellectual capabilities of Leocata from the great esteem in which Ramón Perellós, the Grand Master of the Order of Knights Hospitaller, had for him. Documentary evidence exists which shows that the Grand Master recommended him to foreign diplomats for his wisdom and general abilities.

Leocata became a Bachelor of Theology by sitting to a special exam in Rome, Italy, in 1700. Immediately, he was sent to Tripani, Sicily as Master of the Dominican students there, and also as Regent of Studies at the Dominican studium. He was instituted in these offices in 1701. After two years (1703) in Sicily, Leocata returned to Malta to teach philosophy and theology at the Bishop's Seminary. He stayed here barely two years, for in 1705 he was sent once more to Tripani at Regent of Studies there.

Put forward by Perellós, in 1707 Leocata was recommended to the Master of the Dominican Order for the office of Vicar-General of the Dominicans in Malta on behalf of the Sicilian Prior Provincial, a proposal which was accepted the following year (1708). In the meantime, the Dominican community at the Priory of Portus Salutis of Valletta elected Leocata as its superior. Thus, Leocata lived there and lectured at the Studium Generale of Valletta. Though juridically his office was subordinate to a higher one in Sicily, he was given wide decision-making powers to be almost independent. When, in 1710, his office as Vicar-General expired, Leocata was appointed for a second term. In 1712, Grand Master Perellós recommended for a third period (which was quite exceptional), however Rome declined the suggestion. He was appointed to the same office in 1717 and again in 1719.

Between 1729, Leocata was elected Priory to the community at Vittoriosa, Malta, and a year later, in 1730, to that at Valletta. At each place, Leocata lectured at their respective Studium Generale. In 1730, he was chosen to be the Prior Provincial in Sicily. However, Rome objected, and instead appointed him, for the fifth time, Vicar-General in Malta. In 1738, he was also Prior of the community at Valletta.

Leocata died at Valletta in 1745.

== Known works ==
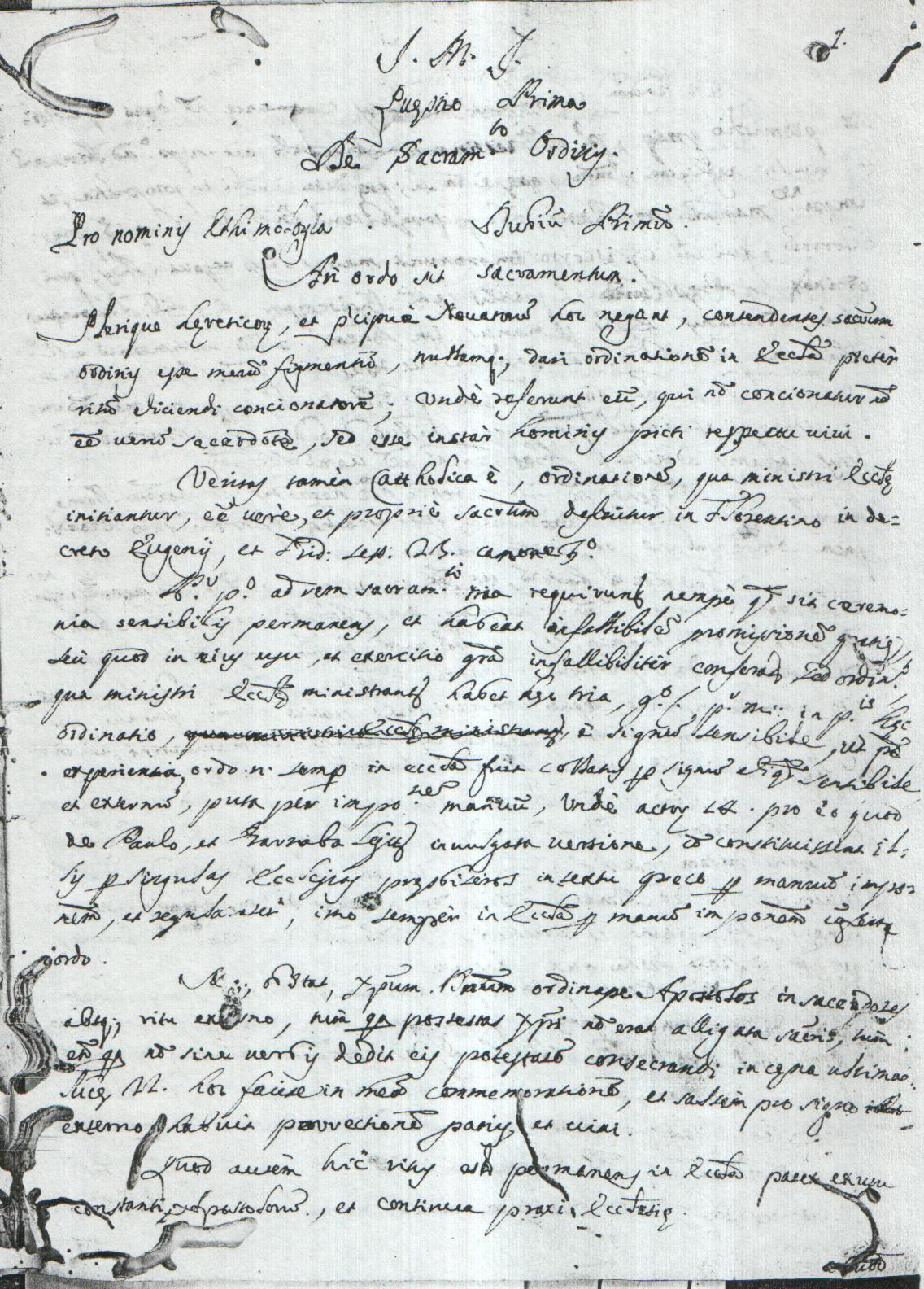
One of Leocata's manuscripts (1697)

The extant works of Leocata are not penned down by his own hand. They are manuscripts inscribed word for word by a student of his, John Mary Gatt. It seems that Leocata himself endorsed the manuscripts produced by Gatt, since they remained in his possession, and probably used them for his lectures. All of them are in Latin.

=== The transcriber ===
Very little is known about Gatt except that he hailed from Zebbug, Malta. However, we do possess one manuscript composed by him, called Propositiones Damnate, which was finished in 1700. For sure, this work was part of Gatt's learning experience while frequenting Leocata. In fact, it was added to the bound volume containing Leocata's lectures as transcribed by Gatt himself. All of these (Leocata's and Gatt's manuscripts) are held at the archives of the Dominican priory of Portus Salutis at Valletta. Gatt's manuscript is a collection of seven propositions (statements or sentences) containing beliefs condemned by the Catholic Church.

=== Nature and study ===
Since all of Leocata's extant manuscripts deal the Catholic Sacraments, it might be taken for granted that they are of solely theological interest. However, this is not the case. Leocata deals with each subject in a purely philosophical manner, consistently venturing to provide philosophical arguments and foundations to the religious or spiritual themes he deals with.

As no manuscript of Leocata has been transliterated, much less translated into any modern language, knowledge of the contents of his works are limited.

Leocata's extant works are all of an Aristotelian-Thomist approach. Both in content and in methodology they are very much in the style of Scholasticism. As might be expected, than, he holds Aristotle and Thomas Aquinas as his major authorities and mentors.

=== List ===
As indicated above, all the lectures contained in Leocata's extant manuscripts were delivered by him at the Studium Generale of Portus Salutis at Valletta, Malta. They are the following:

- 1697 – Brevis Tractatus De Sacramentis in Genere ("A Brief Study of Sacraments in General"); 85 folios.
- 1698 – Tractatus De Sacrosancto Eucharistiæ ("A Study on the Blessed Sacrament of the Eucharist"); 22 folios.
- 1699 – Tractatus Scholasticus de Sacramento Pœnitentia ("A Scholastic Study on the Sacrament of Penance"); 29 folios.
- 1699 – Brevis Tractatus De Sacramento Ordinis simul et Matrimonii ("A Brief Study on the Sacrament of Holy Orders and the same on Matrimony"); 11 folios.
- 1699 – Brevis Tractatus De Confessariis Sollicitantibus ("A Brief Study on Confessors who Sollicit [Sexual Favours]"); 31 folios.
- c.1700 – Brevis Tractatus De Sacramento Baptismi ("A Brief Study on the Sacrament of Baptism"); 19 folios.
- c.1700 – Brevis Tractatus De Confirmationis Sacramento ("A Brief Study on the Sacrament of Confirmation"); 31 folios.

A further manuscript attributed to Leocata is:

- 1692 – De Virtutibus Theologicis ("On the Theological Virtues"); 145 folios.

== See also ==
- Philosophy in Malta
