= Adrien de Wignacourt =

63rd Prince and Grand Master of the Order of Malta

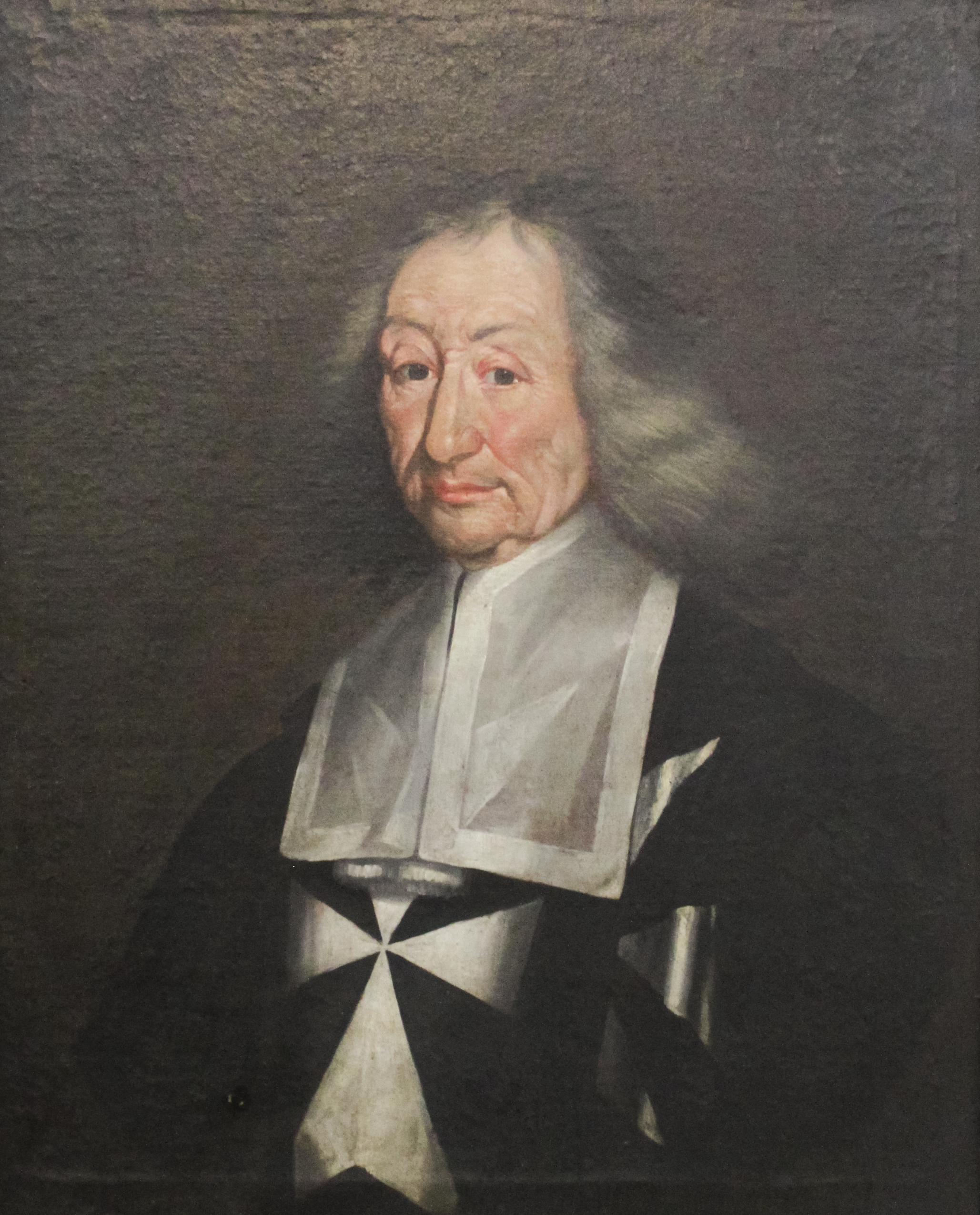

Grand Master of the Order of Saint John
- In office 24 July 1690 – 4 February 1697
- Monarch: King Charles III
- Preceded by: Gregorio Carafa
- Succeeded by: Ramon Perellos y Roccaful

Personal details
- Born: 1618 France
- Died: February 4, 1697 (aged 78–79) Malta
- Resting place: St. John's Co-Cathedral

Military service
- Allegiance: (Sovereign Military Order of Malta) Order of Saint John

Fra' Adrien de Wignacourt (1618 – 4 February 1697) was the 63rd Prince and Grand Master of the Order of Malta from 1690 to 1697.

He was the nephew of Fra Alof de Wignacourt. He was elected Grand Master after the death of Fra Gregorio Carafa in 1690.

He died in 1697 and was succeeded by Fra Ramon Perellos.

Preceded by Gregorio Carafa	Grand Master of the Knights Hospitaller; 1690–1697	Succeeded by Ramon Perellos y Roccaful
