= Casa Perellos =

Country residence in Żejtun, Malta

- Dar Perellos
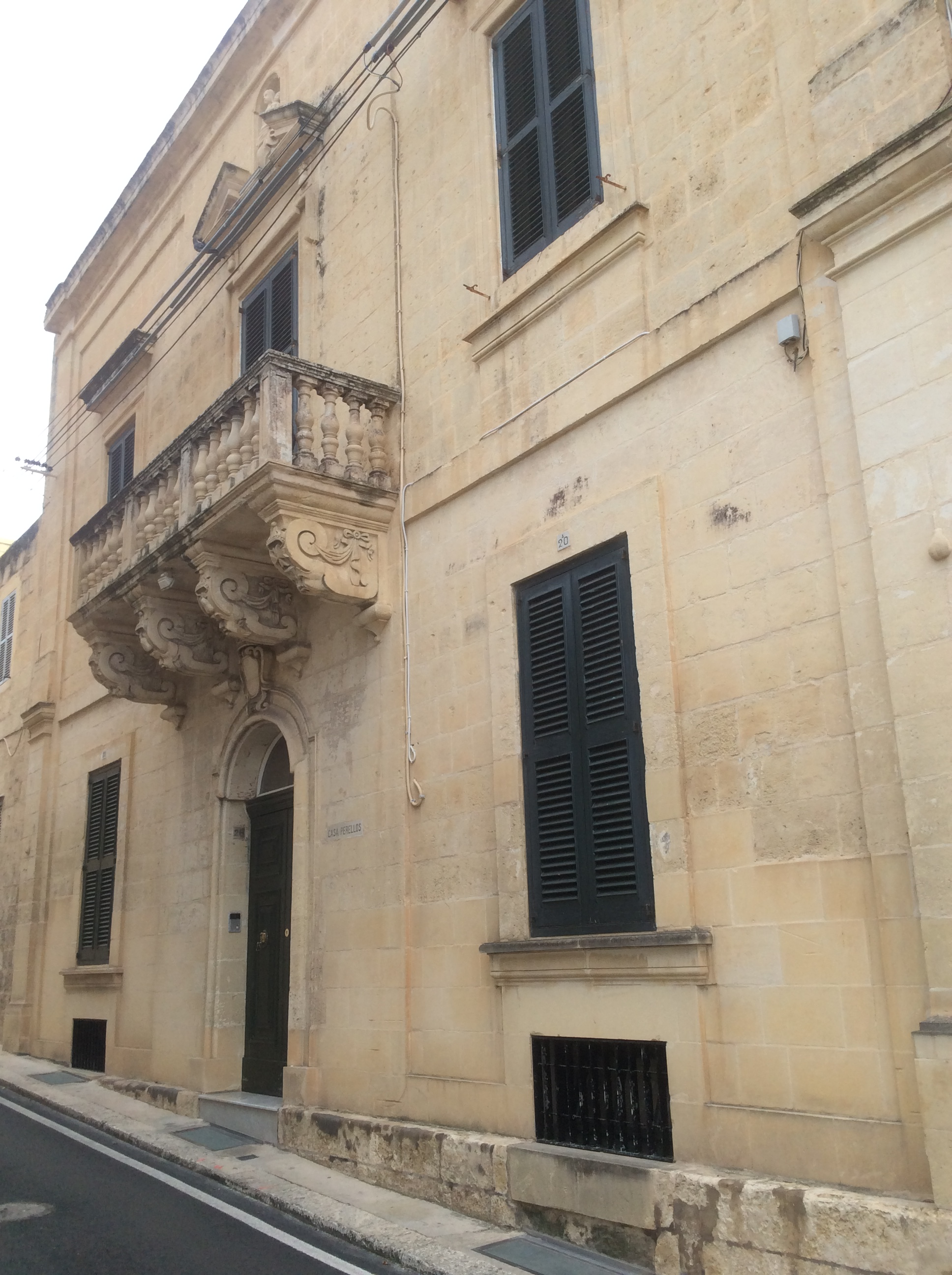
- Casa Perellos after restoration
- Interactive map of the Casa Perellos area

General information
- Status: Intact
- Type: Country residence
- Architectural style: Spanish Baroque
- Location: Żejtun, Malta
- Coordinates: 35°51′21″N 14°31′53″E
- Current tenants: Private residence
- Completed: 18th century

Technical details
- Material: Limestone
- Floor count: 2

Casa Perellos (from Catalan: Perellós) is a Baroque townhouse, originally a country residence with open country views, in Żejtun, Malta. It was built as a private property purposely intended for the then Grand Master of the Order of St John Ramón Perellós y Rocafull and his family. It is now a private residence, generally not open to the public, and is a landmark on its own as well as part of a heritage trail in the city.

The façade of the building has a number of pears carved in limestone, an unmistakable emblem to the Perellos family coat-of-arms. The courtyard at the back of the residence has imposing architectural elements, including a fountain with a wall-mounted coat-of-arms. The residence is in a prominent street leading to St. Catherine's Old Church. This site was chosen in order for the Grand Master to watch from the balcony the end of the procession during St. Gregory’s feast.

In 2005, the restoration project of Casa Perellos was awarded a Diploma award by NGO Din l-Art Ħelwa. A religious niche at the top of the façade is listed on the National Inventory of the Cultural Property of the Maltese Islands (NICPMI). The property is in good condition and has three floors, with one mezzanine and two floors above street level.

== Early history and interior ==
The building conforms to the baroque architectural style, with a number of architectural decorations, including a stone balcony resting on four corbels. Two of the corbels have an eight-pointed cross sculpture, while the other two have pear carvings. Pears can also be found on the columns on either side of the façade. On the façade, there is also a niche with a statue of Our Lady of the Rosary. A complete coat of arms of Grand Master Perellos is also found on a fountain in the garden of this house.

== Later history and restoration ==
Pharmacist Vincent (Ċensinu) Caruana from Żejtun, who lived in Casa Perellos, obtained a warrant to practise pharmacy in 1922, and opened the "Perellos Pharmacy" in his house. The property suffered extensive damage during the Second World War. It was then abandoned and fell in severe neglect. The cellar of the house also served as a horse stable.

Refurbishment works restored the building to its former standing in the architectural and social fabric of the town, the design began in 2001 and the project was completed in 2005. Works included the complete restoration of the structure and the redecoration of the interiors. The original spaces and rooms were recreated with minimum intervention. At the rear, however, two new lateral wings built of glass and steel were built. The new wings house a kitchen, bedrooms and bathrooms. The courtyard and garden act as a central living room for the palazzo, while the axis of the entrance and hallway, leads to a small fountain and a basin surmounted by the Grand Master's coat-of-arms.

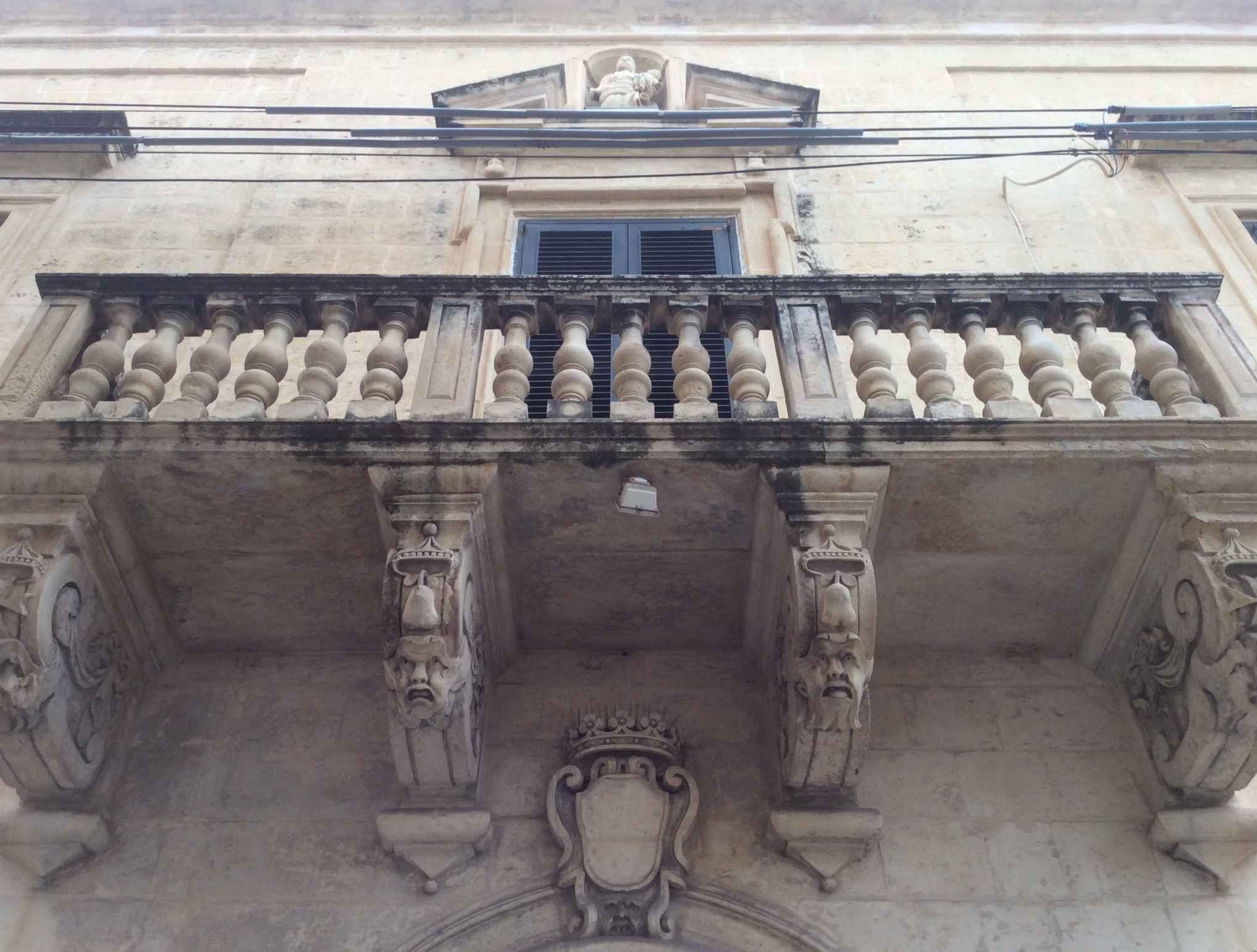
The baroque stone balcony of Casa Perellos resting on four corbels.

The project was praised as "a successful an elegant and sympathetic restoration of an old, virtually derelict, house [...] meshing it in most successfully and unobtrusively with an extension in modern contemporary design. This was a difficult restoration and intervention carried out to very high standards. Respect for the original structure of this 18th century house has been most carefully maintained.”

During refurbishment works, a rock cut air-raid shelter was also uncovered.

== See also ==
- Palazzo Perellos, Valletta
- Villa Perellos, Paola
