= Gregorio Carafa =

Grandmaster of the Order of Saint John

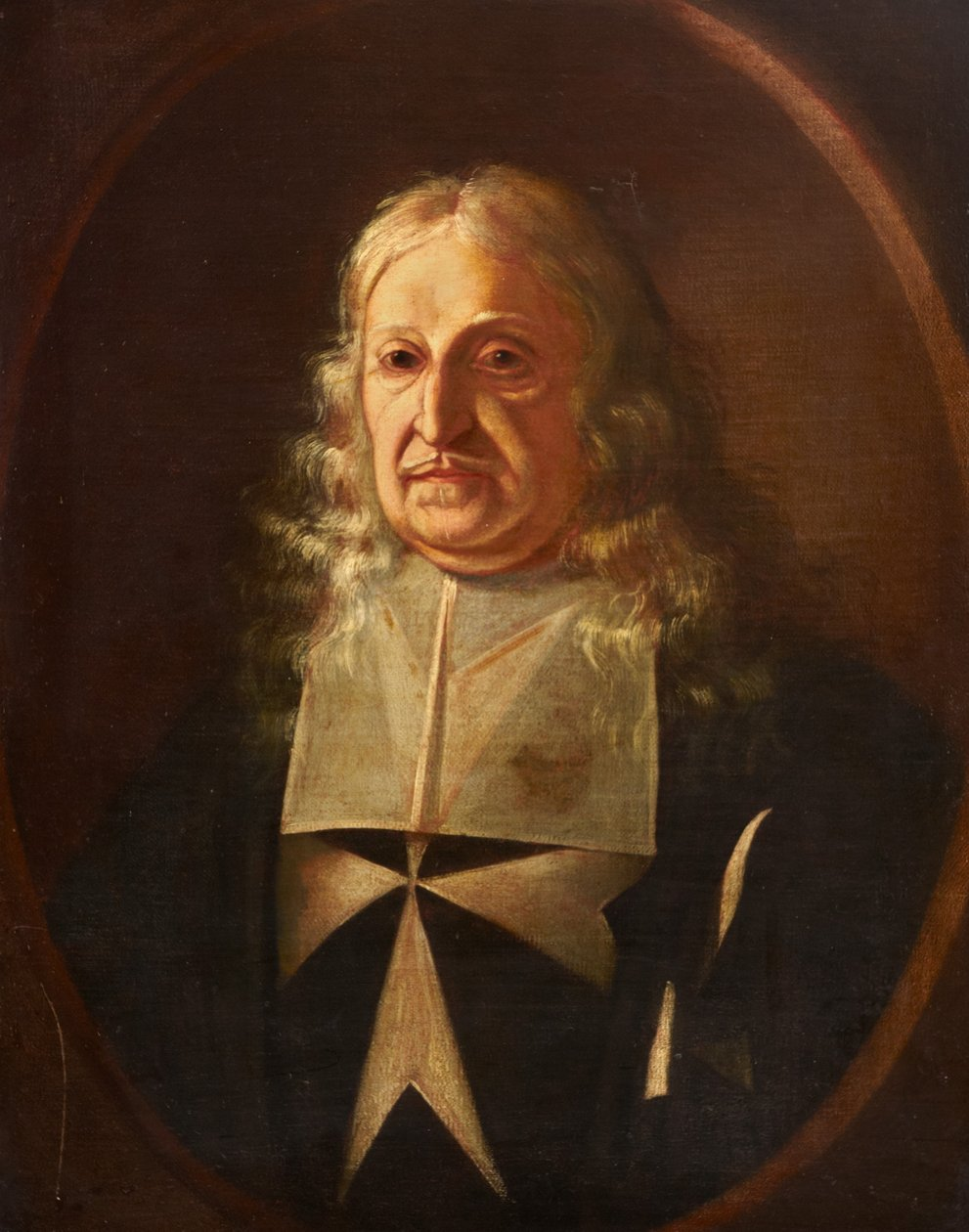

Grand Master of the Order of Saint John
- In office 2 May 1680 – 21 July 1690
- Preceded by: Nicolas Cotoner
- Succeeded by: Adrien de Wignacourt

Personal details
- Born: 17 March 1615 Castelvetere (modern Caulonia) Calabria
- Died: 21 July 1690 (aged 75) Malta
- Resting place: St. John's Co-Cathedral

Military service
- Allegiance: (Sovereign Military Order of Malta) Order of Saint John
- Battles/wars: Battle of the Dardanelles

Fra Gregorio Carafa (17 March 1615 – 21 July 1690) was a nobleman from the House of Carafa and the 61st Grand Master of the Order of Saint John, from 1680 to his death in 1690.

== Early life ==
Carafa was born on 17 March 1615 in Castelvetere (modern Caulonia) in Calabria, Italy to Girolamo, Prince of Roccella and Diana Vittori, the niece of Pope Paul IV. His brother was the Cardinal Carlo Carafa della Spina.

He was enlisted with the Order of Saint John when he was only three months, in June 1615. He studied in Naples where various dignitaries and knights of the Order contributed to his education. In 1635, he went to Catalonia with his uncle Francesco Carafa, the prior general of Roccella. Carafa was soon promoted to Knight Grand Cross of the Order, and was promoted to prior general of Rocella after his uncle died.

In 1647, he was involved in the Masaniello revolt where he tried to restore peace and order in Naples. After the defeat of the rebels, he was sent to Calabria to quell the uprising there. These accomplishments led to his promotion and command appointment of the Order's fleet.

In 1656, he became the commander for the 7 Maltese galleys at the Battle of the Dardanelles. In this battle, the joint Venetian-Maltese fleet was victorious, and as a reward, Malta received 11 captured Ottoman ships. This battle was considered the heaviest naval defeat for the Ottomans since the Battle of Lepanto.

After the victorious battle, he was welcomed and recognized in Malta as a hero. Subsequently, he reclaimed the wetlands at Bormola and strengthened the Order's fleet.

== Magistracy ==
In 1682, he was elected Grand Master of the Order after the death of Nicolas Cotoner. In the same year that he became Grand Master, Carafa paid for the renovation of Auberge d'Italie. The facade was rebuilt in Baroque style, and a bronze bust of Carafa was placed in a prominent position over the front door of the Auberge. His personal coat of arms was also sculpted close to the bust.

From 1681 onwards, Fort Saint Angelo was strengthened and rebuilt by the architect Carlos de Grunenbergh, at Carafa's request. Carafa's name appears on the plaque above the fort's main gate.

During his reign, the Order's navy was at its peak, with galleys led by knights and manned by experienced crews. Fearing an Ottoman attack, in 1687 Carafa strengthened Fort Saint Elmo by building a series of fortifications known as the Carafa Enceinte on the foreshore surrounding the fortress.

Playing Cards were introduced in Malta during his reign.

Carafa died on 21 July 1690 and was succeeded by Adrien de Wignacourt. He is buried in the Chapel of the Langue of Italy of St. John's Co-Cathedral in Valletta, Malta.

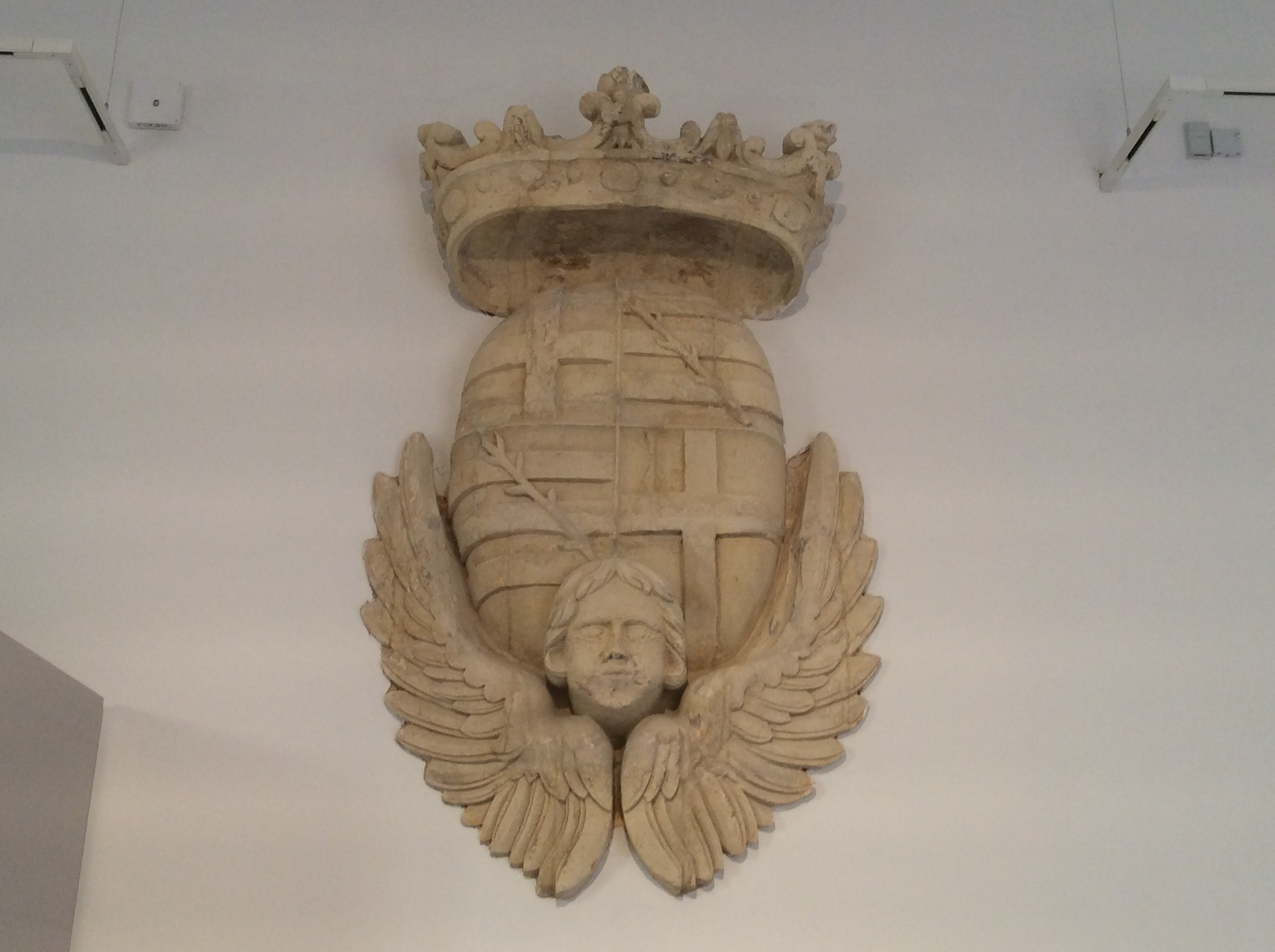
Coat of arms of Carafa from a demolished building, now located at Auberge d'Italie

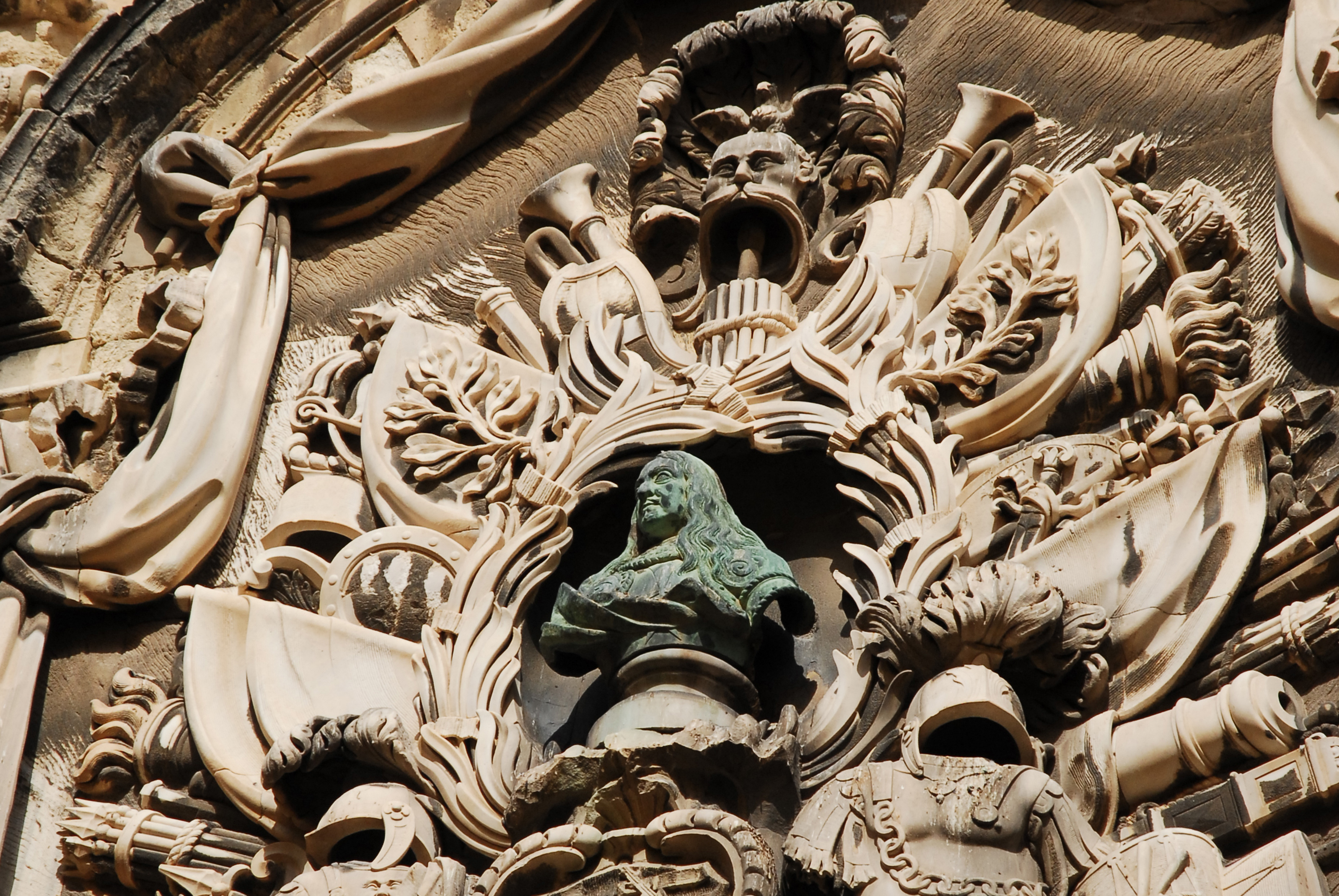
Bronze bust of Carafa at Auberge d'Italie

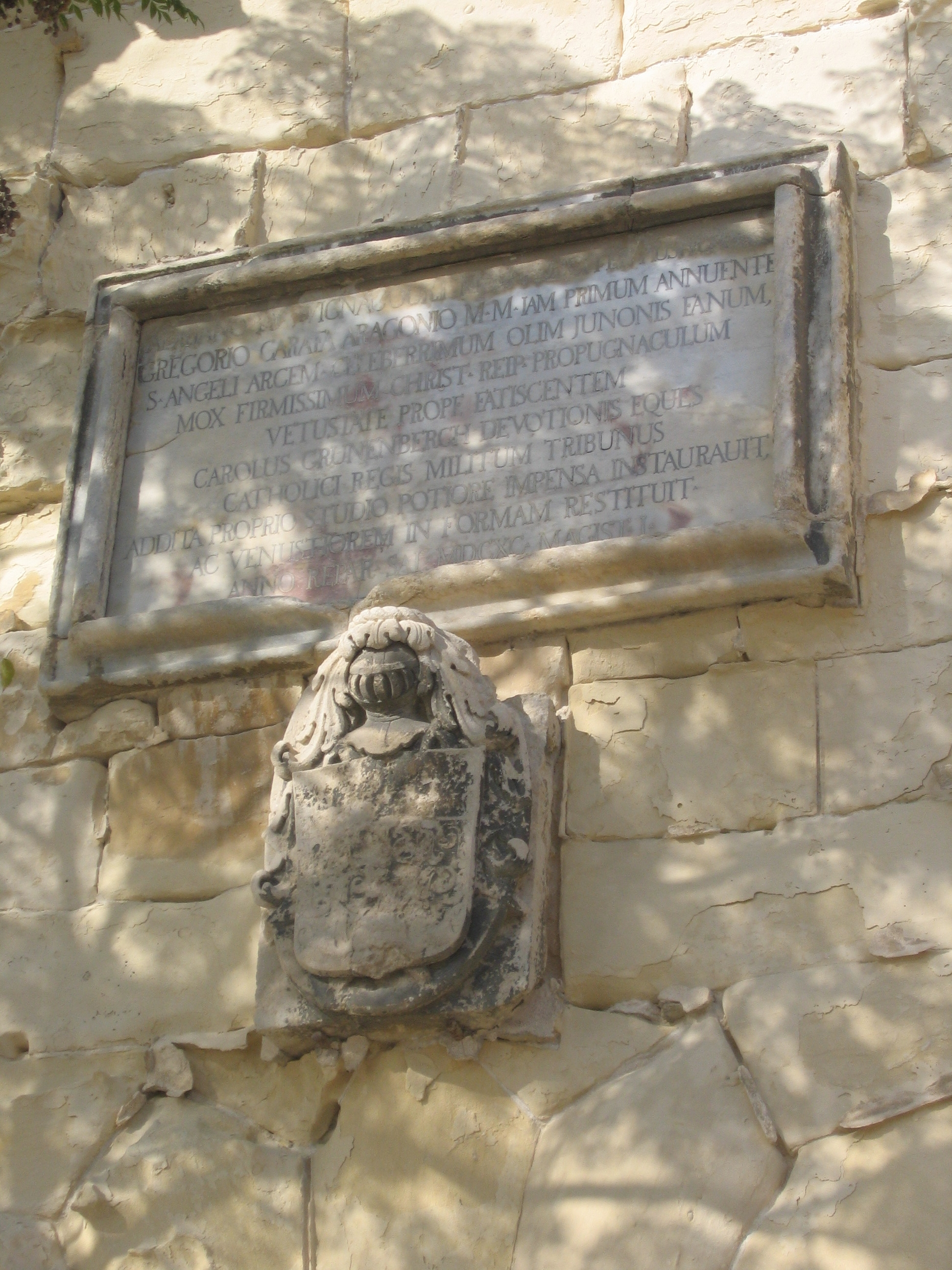
Plaque at Fort Saint Angelo making a reference to Carafa

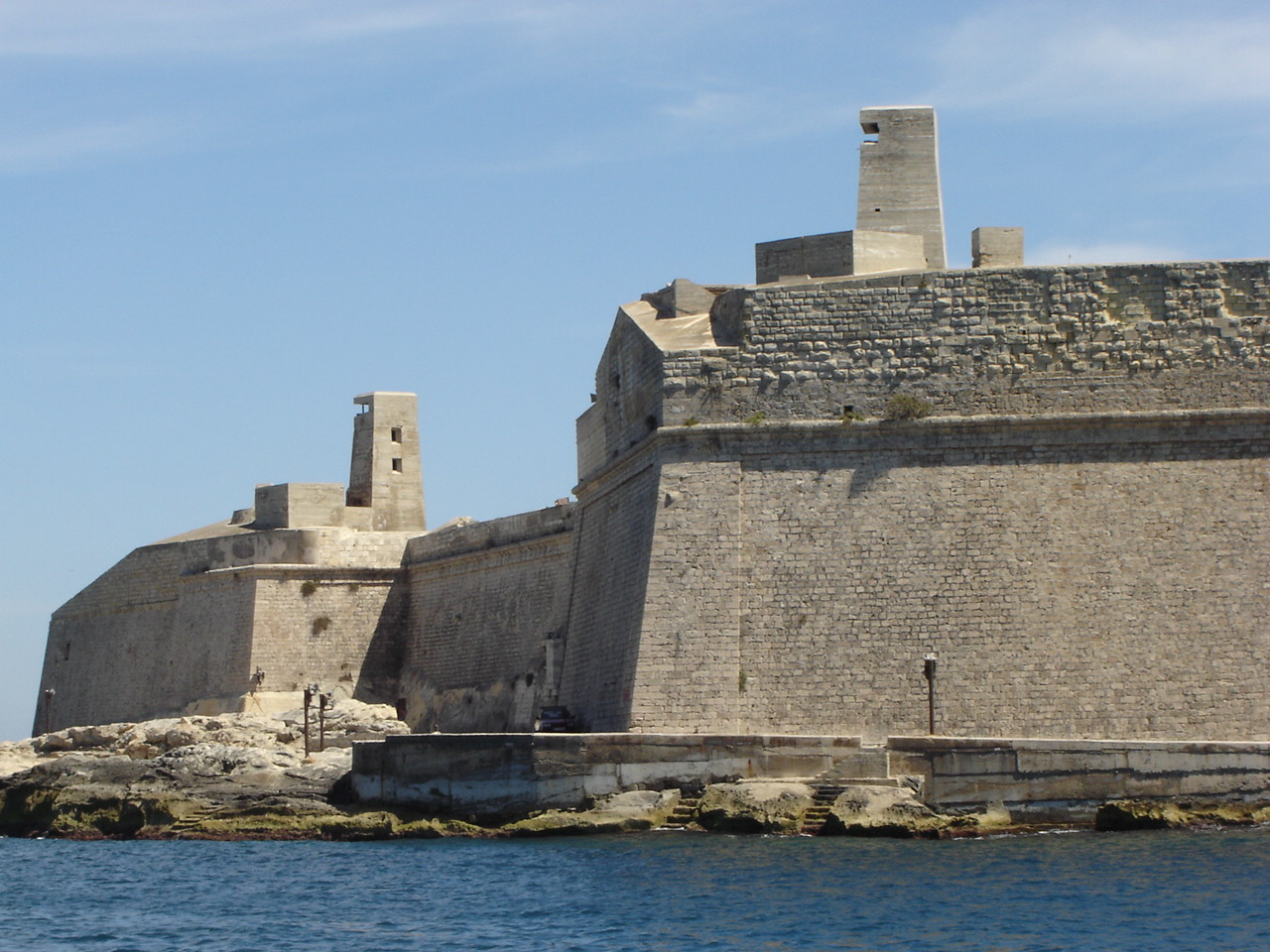
Carafa Enceinte at Fort Saint Elmo

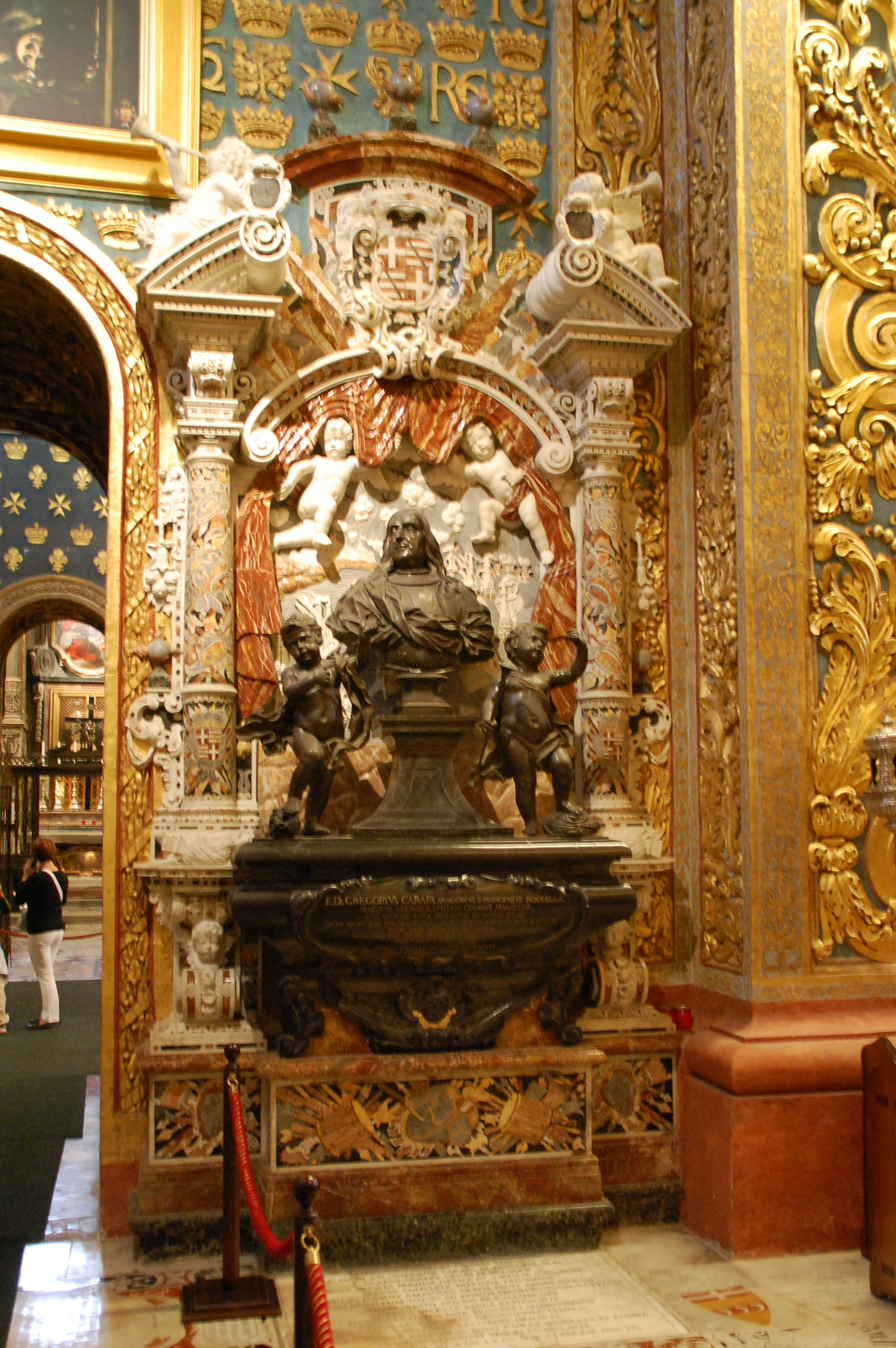
Tomb of Carafa at the St. John's Co-Cathedral

Preceded by Nicolas Cotoner	Grand Master of the Knights Hospitaller; 1680–1690	Succeeded by Adrien de Wignacourt
