= Ramon Perellós =

Grand Master of the Knights Hospitaller

Fra Ramon Perellós i Rocafull
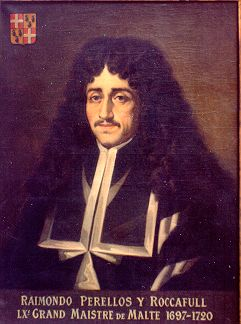

Grand Master of the Order of Saint John
- In office 7 February 1697 – 10 January 1720
- Monarchs: King Charles III; King Philip IV; King Victor Amadeus
- Preceded by: Adrien de Wignacourt
- Succeeded by: Marc'Antonio Zondadari

Personal details
- Born: 1637 Aragon (modern Spain)
- Died: 10 January 1720 (aged 82–83) Malta
- Resting place: St. John's Co-Cathedral

Military service
- Allegiance: (Sovereign Military Order of Malta) Order of Saint John

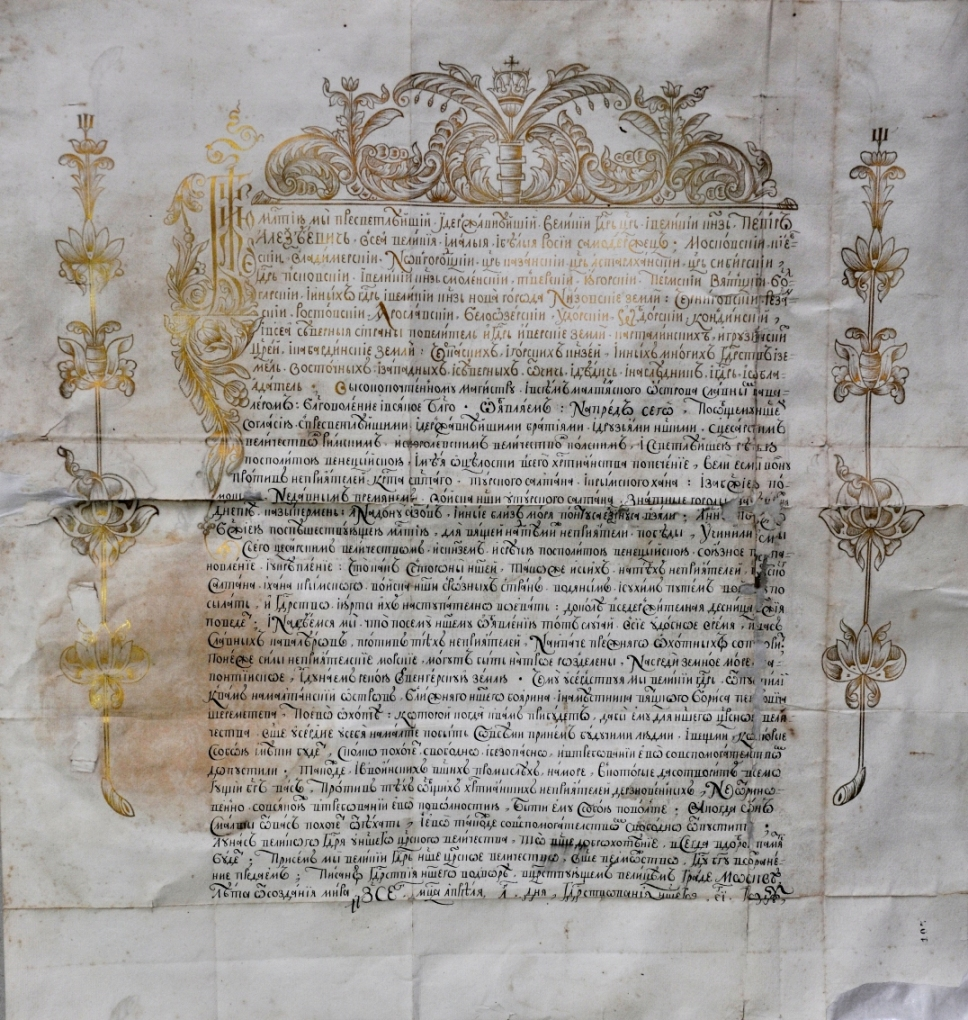
Letter from Tsar Peter I to Grand Master Perellos, 1697

Ramon Rabasa de Perellós y Rocafull (pronounced [raˈmon raˈba.sa pe.ɾeˈʎoz i ɾo.ka.ˈfuʎ]; 1637 in Valencia – 10 January 1720 in Valletta) was a Spanish knight from the Crown of Aragon who served as the 64th Prince and Grand Master of the Order of Malta from 1697 until his death. He was of Valencian origin and was 60 years old when he was elected as Grand Master.

== Biography ==
Ramon Perellós (1637–1720) was the son of the eighth Lord of Benetússer and fifth Baron of Dos Aguas and of María de Rocafull y Vives de Boil, his consort. He joined the Order of Malta at the age of sixteen following family tradition. In 1658 he joined the board of the Master and in 1697 was elected Grand Master and remained so until his death in 1720.

Malta had organised the Consulato del Mare (Consulate of the Sea) for the first time on 1 September 1697 per initiative of Grandmaster Perellós. At the consulate it was decided that four merchants familiar enough with maritime procedures shall be appointed consuls to administer justice, on similar approach to Barcelona and Messina. In 1697, Perellós gave a collection of tapestries to St. John's Co-Cathedral, and commissioned another set of tapestries for the Grand Master's Palace.

Perellós established foreign relations between Malta and Russia for the first time in 1698. During his rule the coastal fortifications of Malta were strengthened by the construction of batteries, redoubts, and entrenchments. He also was the driving force behind the third rate squadron of the order which was eventually inaugurated in 1705. In 1707 he entrusted Romano Carapecchia with the reorganisation of the drainage system in Valletta. He built two country residences, Villa Perellos in Paola and Casa Perellos in Żejtun.

He died after nearly 23 years as a ruler, due to illness and old age. His coat of arms was represented by three black pears against a golden background. His funerary monument is found at St. John's Co-Cathedral in Valletta and is considered to be one of the best examples of baroque art in Malta.

== War against corruption ==
Soon after his appointment, Ramon Perellós became very active in correcting cases of corruption and abuse within the Order. One such case involved the request by knights to receive graces and be nominated to the title of Gran Croce di Grazia (literally: great cross by grace). This title implied that a graced knight could replace a knight of the Great Cross upon the latter's death. This procedure was not well reputed among elder knights who spent their lifetime at the service of the Order, and resulted in many of them retiring to return to their homelands and leave their inheritances to their respective families, against the rules of the Order. The pleas of Perellos to eliminate such prejudicial recommendations were considered legitimate by Pope Innocent XII who agreed to forbid them.

== War against the Ottoman pirates ==
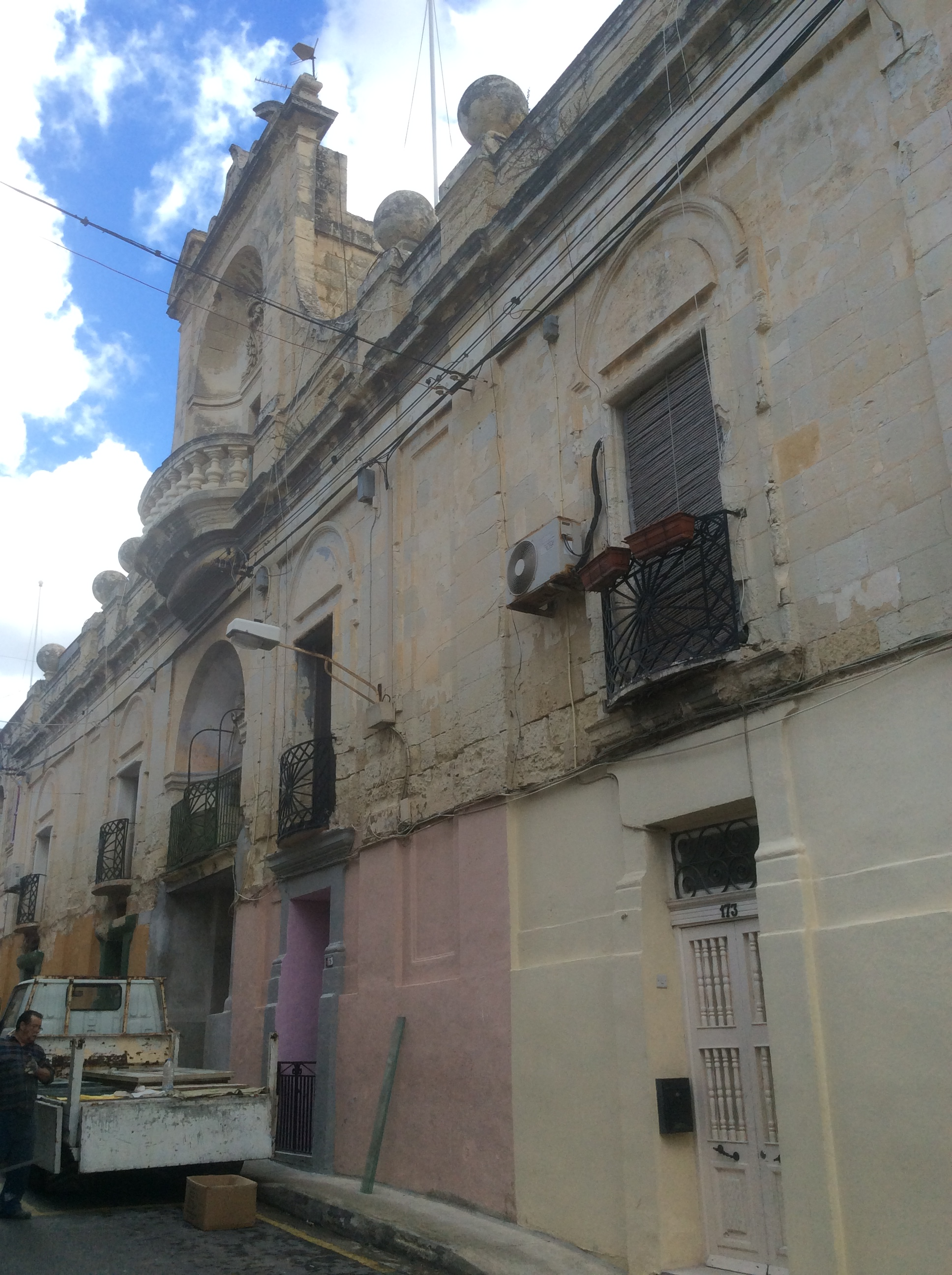
Villa Perellos in Paola, Malta

Perellós dedicated many of his efforts to stop the attacks at sea by Ottoman pirates, who would sail along the coasts of Spain and Italy to plunder merchant ships and enslave civilians. He ordered the knight of St. Pierre of the French Royal Naval Fleet to build a new war fleet to fight the Ottoman scourge. Meanwhile, the old galleys, together with the might of a vessel armed with 80 cannons, waged war at sea against the pirates.

The Grand Master's new fleet was ready in port by 1706 and was headed by the same knight of St. Pierre. Three large vessels were launched that year by the names St. Vincent, St. Joseph and St. Raymond. Shortly afterwards, the fleet sailed west, where they encountered three Tunisian vessels, one of which was seized and incorporated into the fleet under the name of Santa Croce.

One year later, the commanding knight Giuseppe de Langon, surrounded Oran and with his sole vessel, which harbored a force of 50 cannons, traversed the entire enemy fleet despite the vain efforts of the Algerians to catch him. He was subsequently nominated Lieutenant General of the Maltese fleet.

In 1709, the Grand Master's fleet anticipated and repelled eight Turkish vessels which attempted to infiltrate the island of Gozo. During the same year, the Grand Master sent part of his fleet to also repel a Turkish unit which was threatening Calabria. Headed by the commanding knight of Langon, the fleet managed to sink an admiral ship. In the following year the commanding knight of Langon was defeated at sea after attacking an Algerian admiral vessel. Nevertheless, the Maltese fleet emerged victorious. Between 1713 and 1715, the fleet of the Order patrolled all the coasts around the Mediterranean succeeding in various important undertakings.

== Hospital of the Order ==
During the rule of Grand Master Perellós, the Order was amassing great wealth. The Inquisitor Delci desired to garner greater power in Malta and attempted to take hold of the Order's hospital. This hospital was a privileged place and nobody could be admitted prior to presenting their honorary crests, however the inquisition's officers infiltrated the hospital and commenced a formal inspection. These were soon ordered to leave the premises by the commanding knight of Avernes de Bocage, who was the hospital's supervisor. This news reached Grand Master Perellós, who sent his emissary, the Great Prior Marc'Antonio Zondadari, to the Court of Rome to forward complaints about the incident.

== Siege of Venice ==
During the years preceding the siege of Venice, it was believed that the Ottoman Empire had preparations underway to attack Malta. This suspicion became stronger when a well-groomed man, who had approached the Order offering to serve as an engineer and share his wealth of knowledge about fortifications, disappeared shortly after having surveyed Malta's fortifications. Consequently, the Order began its preparations to counter any possible attack by the Ottoman army.

Possibly forewarned by Malta's preparations, the Ottoman sultan turned his attention to the Republic of Venice, on which he declared war in 1716. In reply to a plea for assistance, Grand Master Perellós lent the Republic several galleys and five other warships to repel the Ottoman invasion.

== Gallery ==
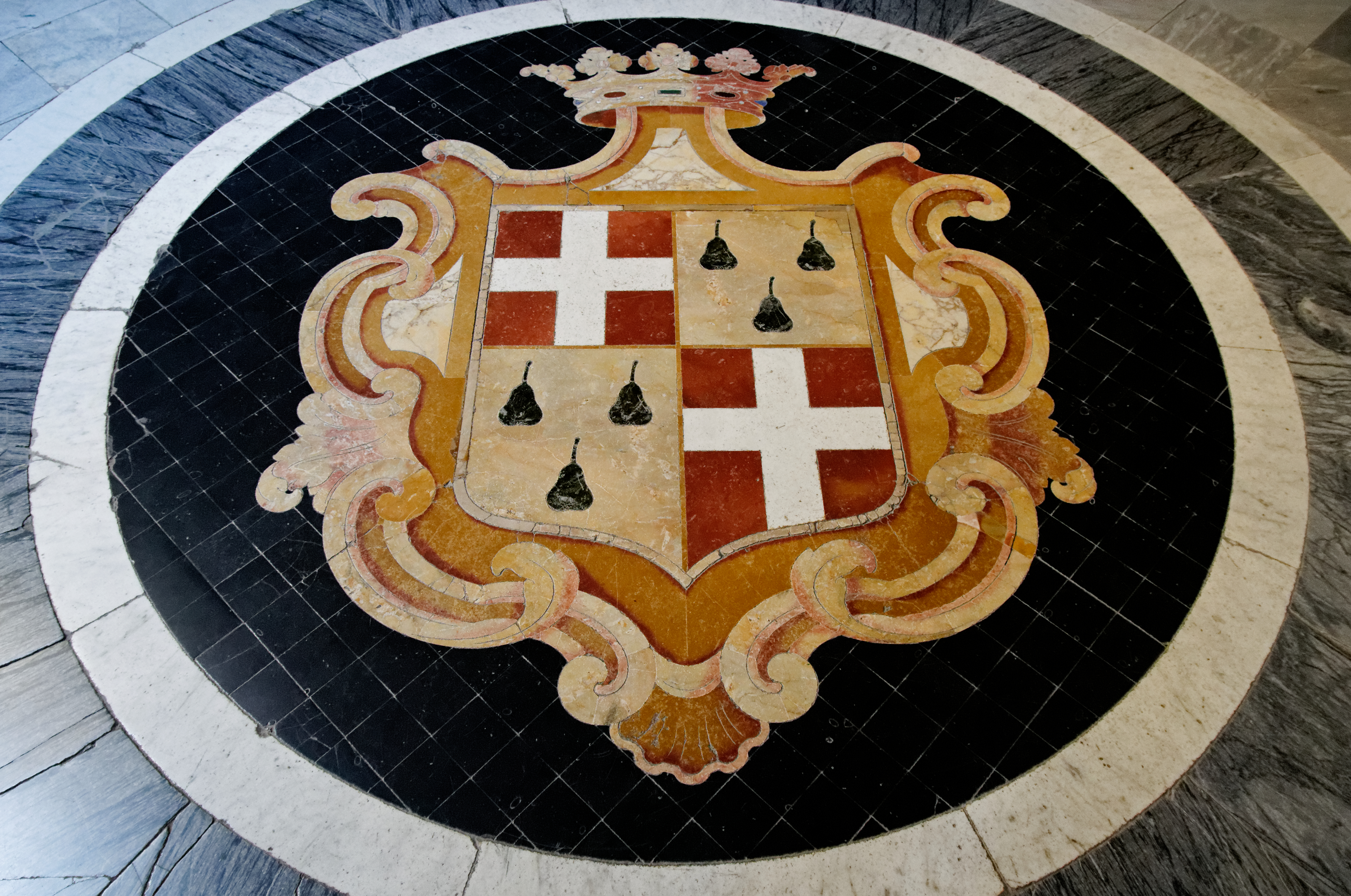
Coat of arms of Perellós at the Grandmaster's Palace in Valletta

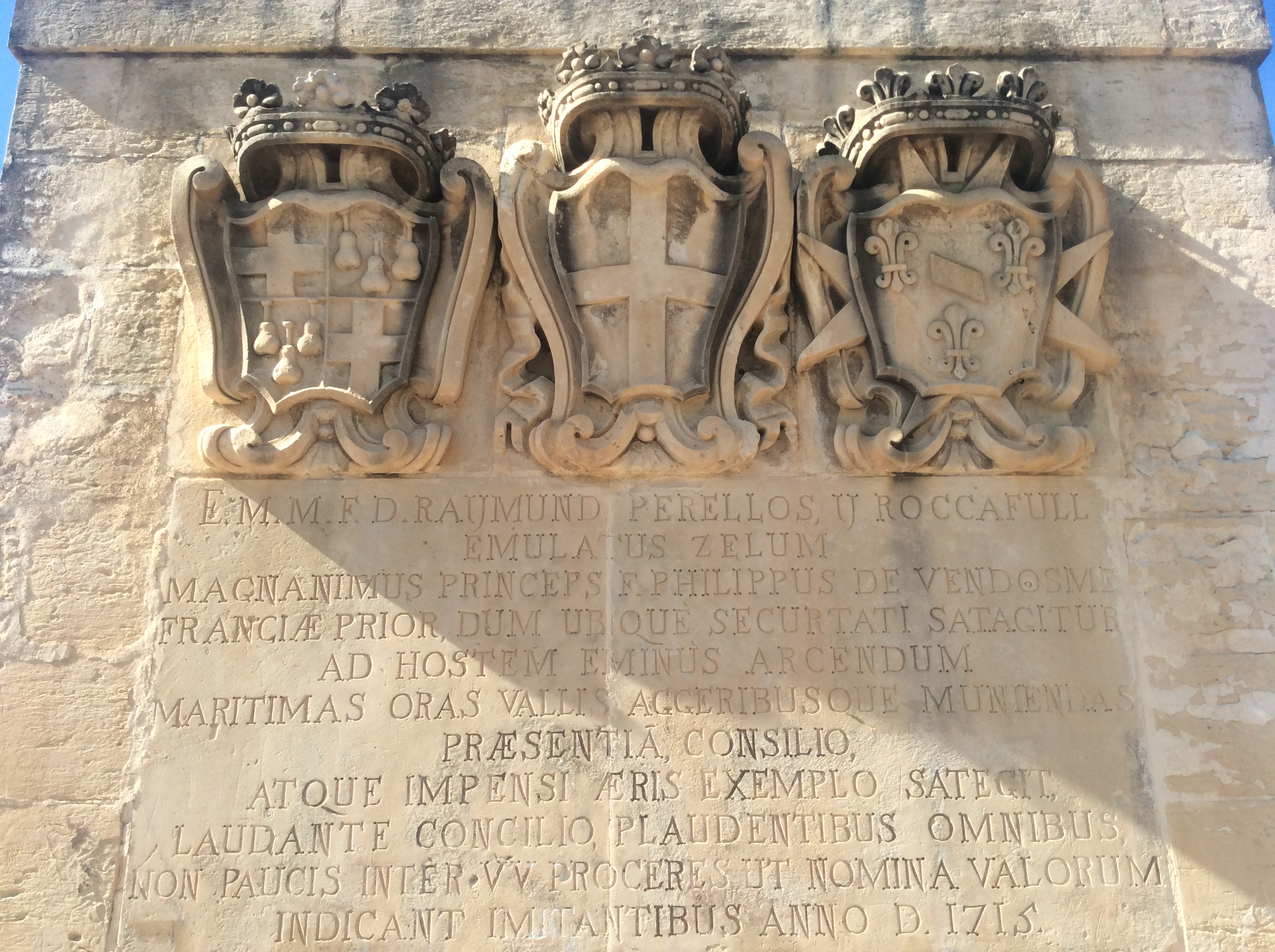
Coat of arms of Perellós, the Order of St. John and the Langue of France above an inscription commemorating the construction of Dellia Battery

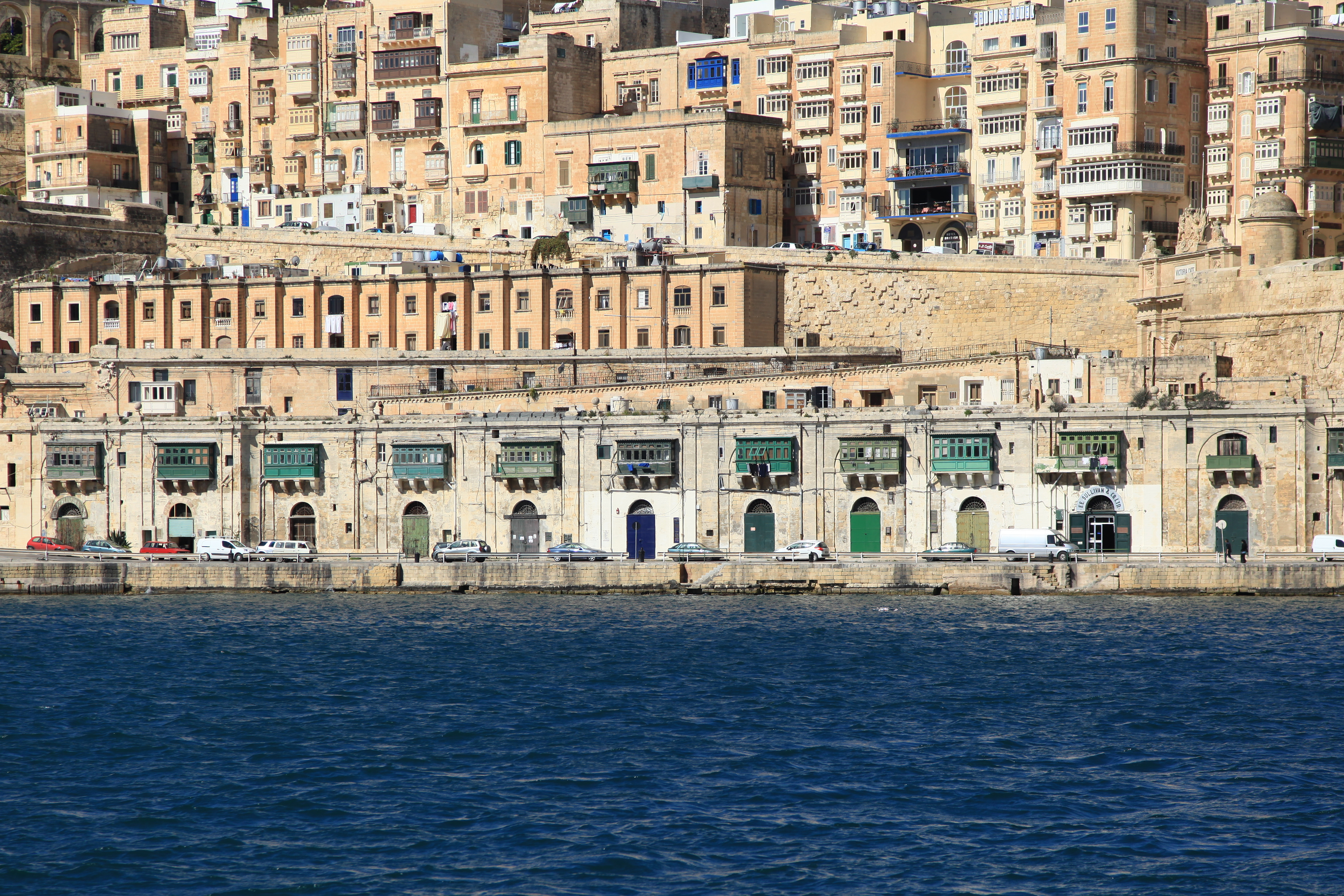
Grand Master Perellós stores in Xatt il-Barriera, Valletta

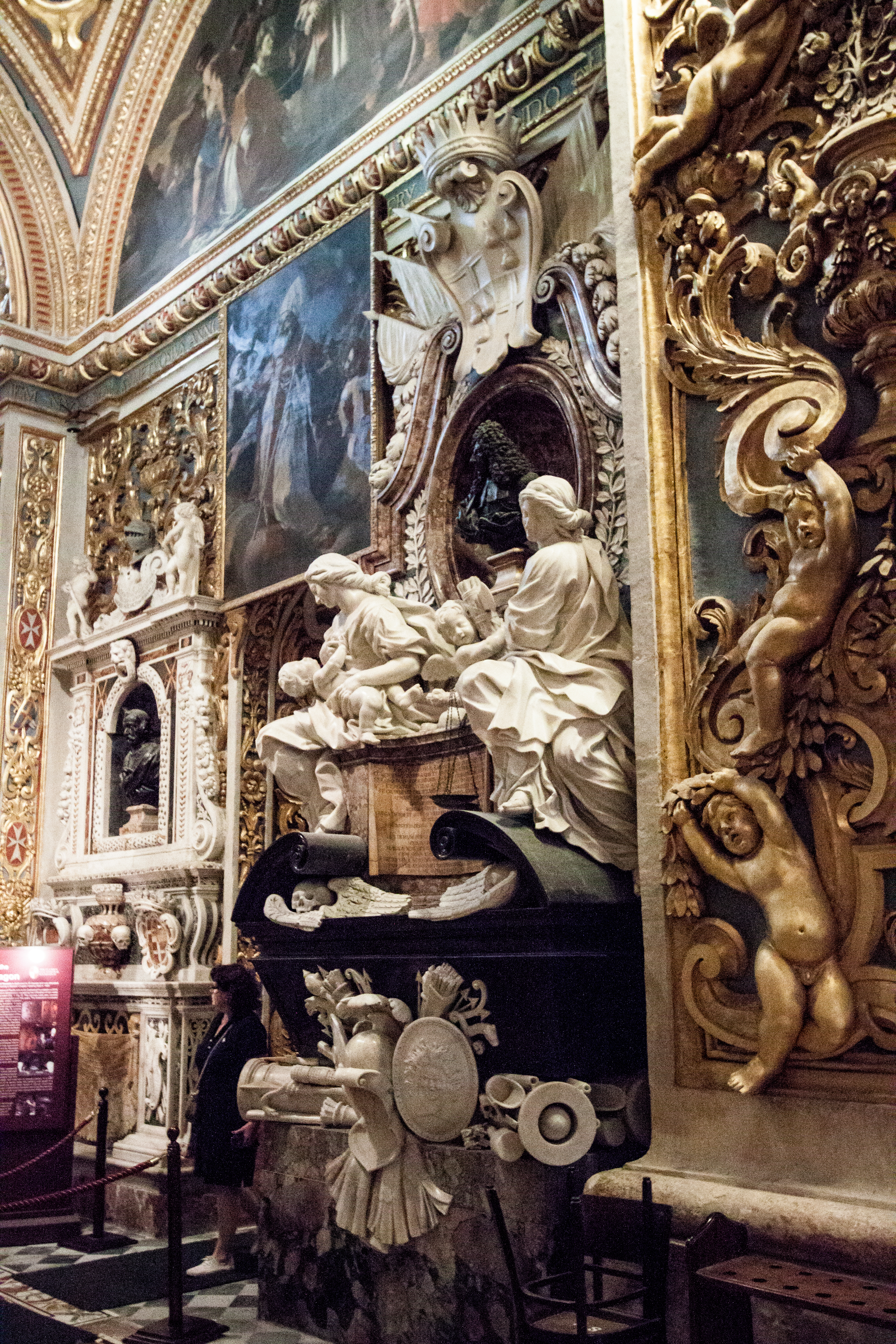
Monument to Perellós in the Chapel of the Langue of Aragon, St. John's Co-Cathedral

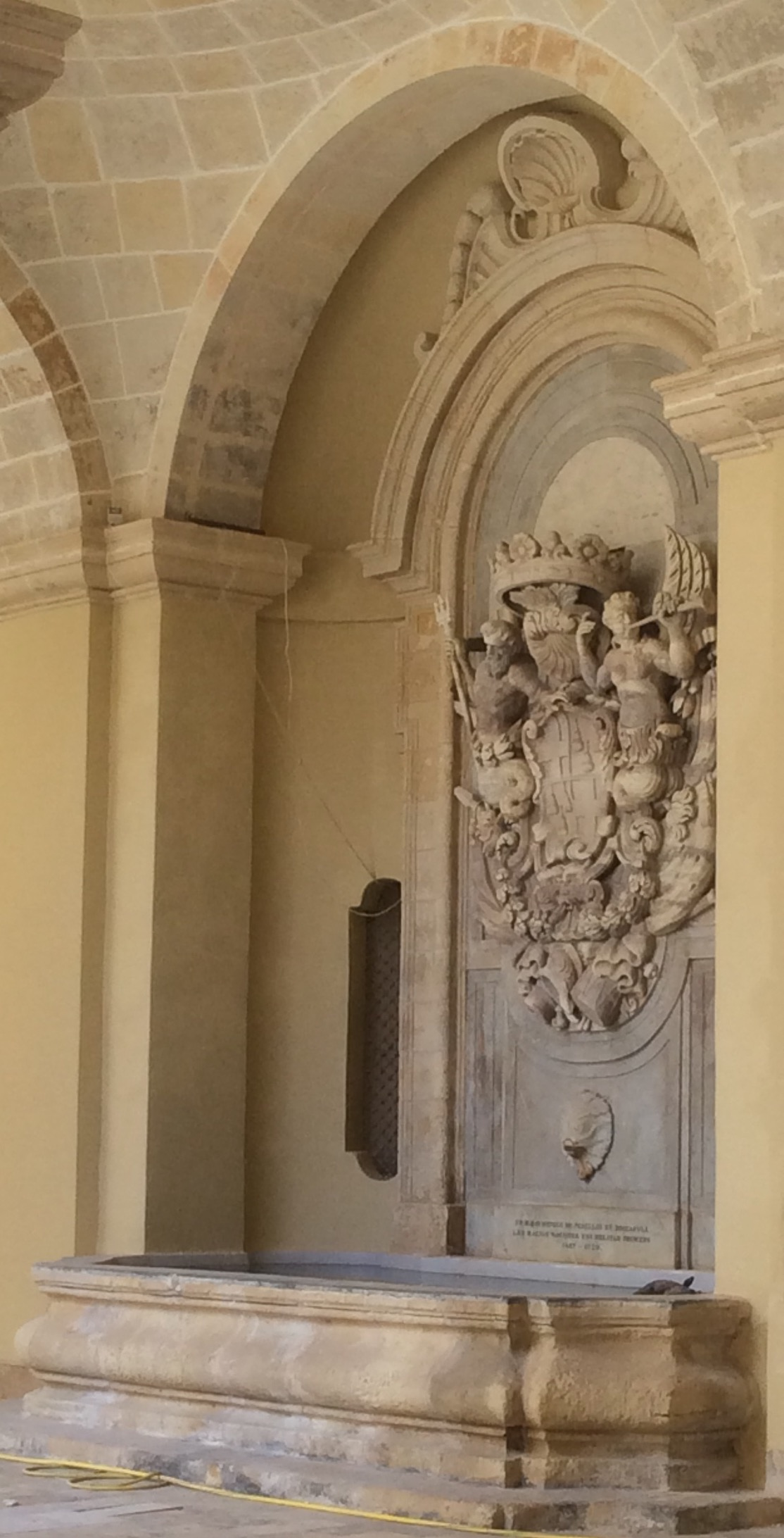
Perellos Fountain in Valletta, designed by Romano Carapecchia

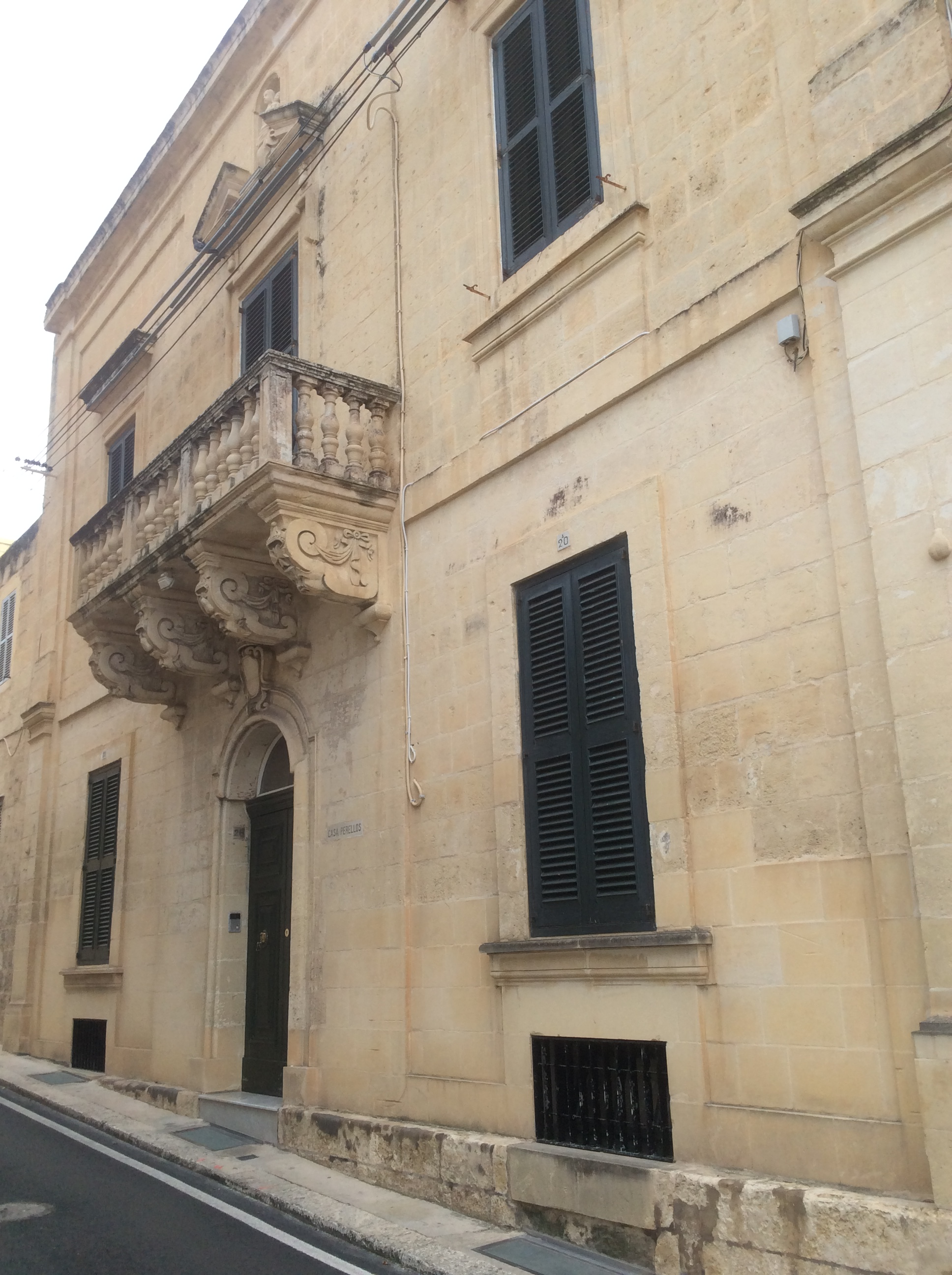
Casa Perellos, the hunting lodge of Grand Master Perellos

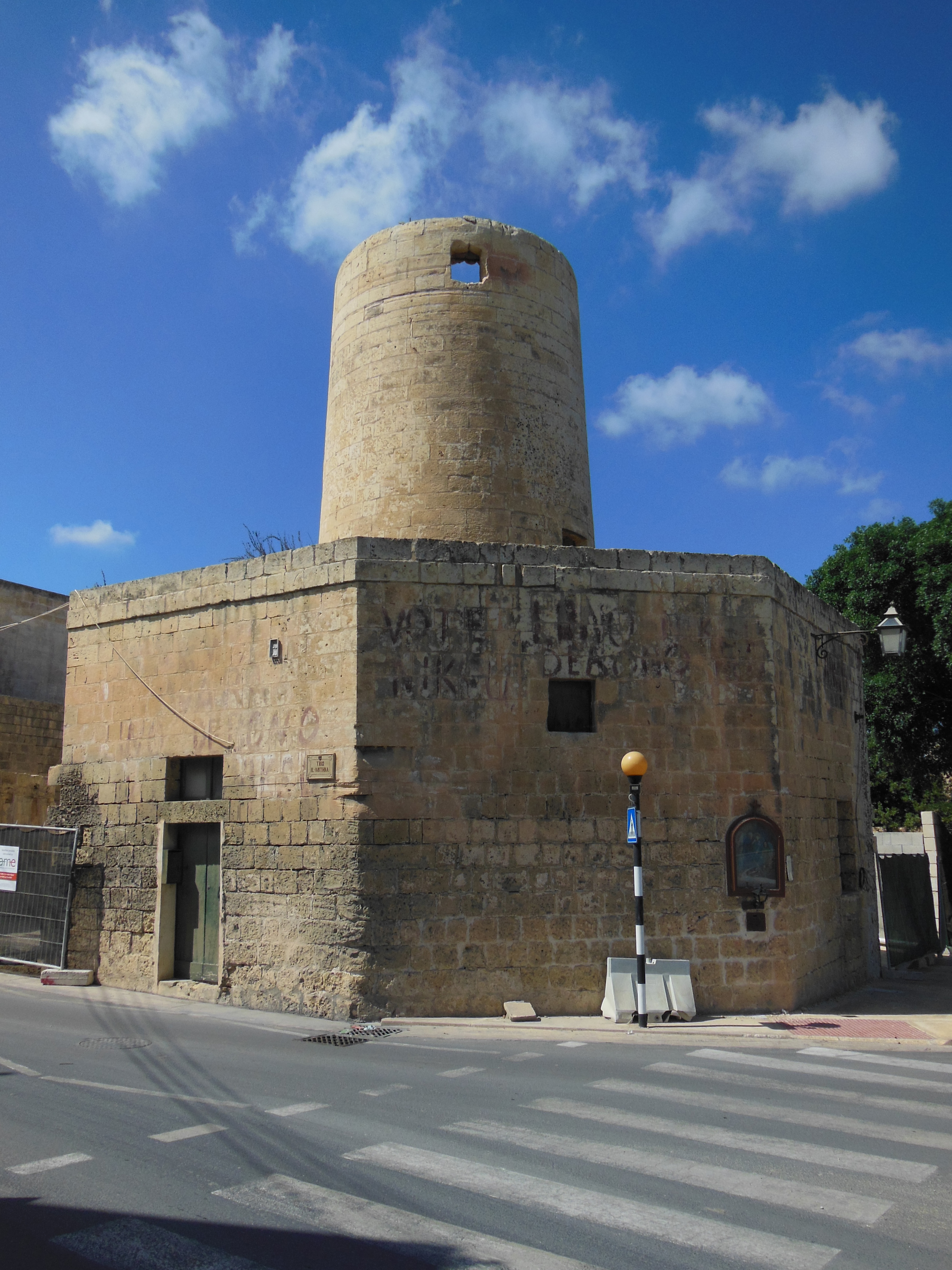
The Octagonal base Windmill in Xewkija, Gozo, built by Perellós' order which started operating in 1710.

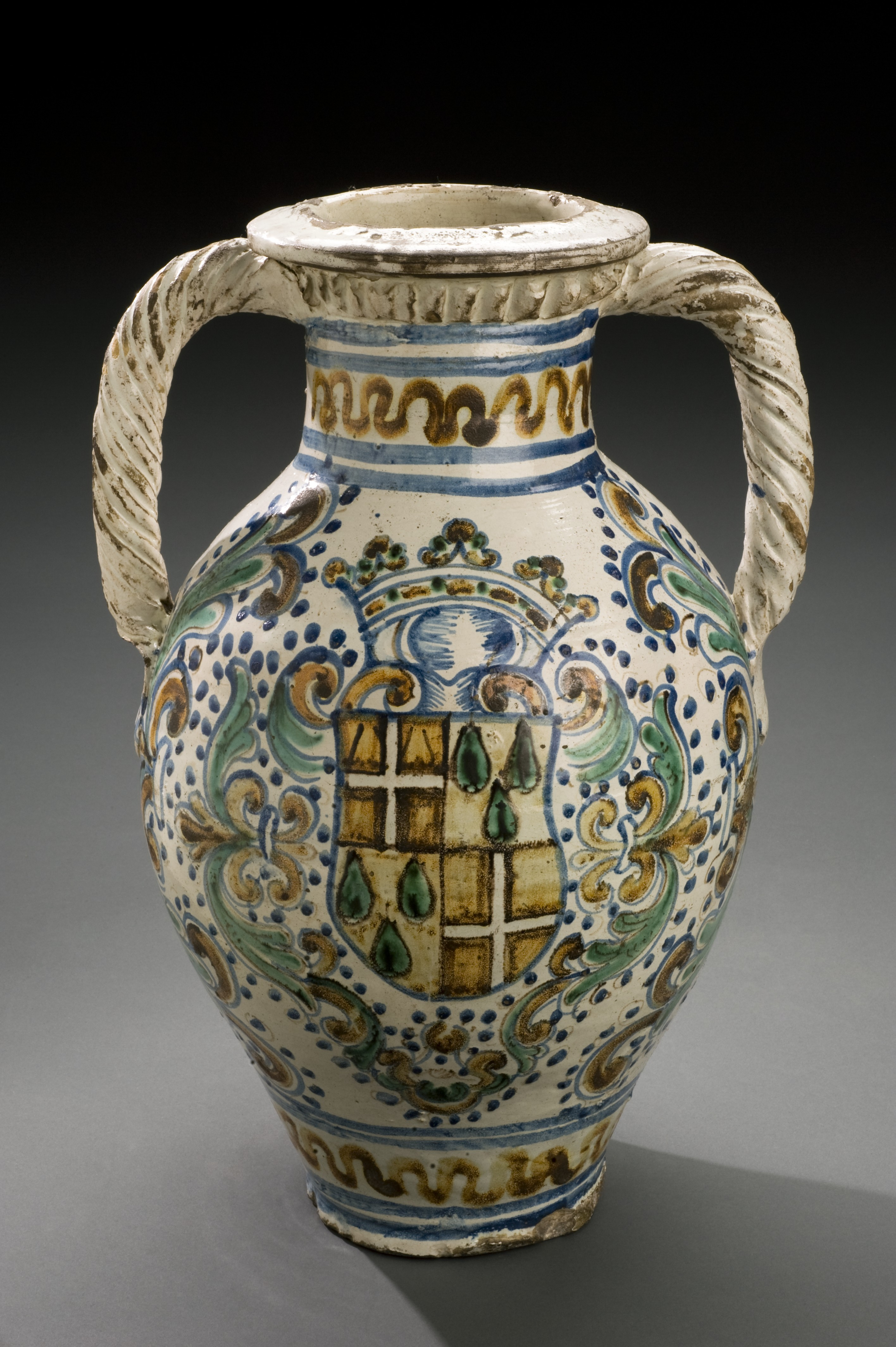
Jar with Perellós' arms, made in Sicily in 1714

Preceded by Adrien de Wignacourt	Grand Master of the Knights Hospitaller; 1697–1720	Succeeded by Marc'Antonio Zondadari
