= National Congress Battalions =

Irregular militia of Malta, in service from 1798 to 1800

- Battaglioni del Congresso Nazionale; Battaljuni tal-Kungress Nazzjonali
- White and red standard reportedly used by the rebels
- Leaders: Emmanuele Vitale; Vincenzo Borg; Francesco Saverio Caruana
- Dates active: September 1798 – 11 September 1800
- Headquarters: Casa Leoni, Santa Venera
- Active regions: Malta
- Size: 10,000 men
- Wars: the Siege of Malta (1798–1800)

The National Congress Battalions (Italian: Battaglioni del Congresso Nazionale, Maltese: Battaljuni tal-Kungress Nazzjonali), also known as the Truppe di Campagna, was an irregular military set up in Malta just after the Maltese rebellion against French rule in September 1798. It existed for two years before being disbanded on 11 September 1800.

The battalions were also referred to as the Maltese Army or the Maltese insurgents. See also the list of casal battalion leaders.

== History ==
From 1530, Malta had been administered by the Order of Saint John. The islands were occupied by French forces in June 1798, when Napoleon ousted the Order during the Mediterranean campaign of 1798.

On 2 September 1798, while the French were looting artifacts from a church in Rabat, the Maltese rebelled and opened fire on them. The French retreated to the fortified city of Mdina, but on 3 September, the rebels managed to enter the city from a sally port and the French force surrendered. Most of the towns and villages fell into rebel hands over the next few days, but the French held on to the fortified positions in the Grand Harbour area (including the capital Valletta) and various other forts in Malta and Gozo.

On 4 September, the Maltese formed a National Assembly, and its first task was to create an armed force to blockade the remaining French forces. The force, which was known as the Battaglioni del Congresso Nazionale or the Truppe di Campagna, came into existence in the following days, and it consisted of a number of village battalions, which had their origins in the Order's militia setup prior to the French occupation. Notary Emmanuele Vitale, who had led the attack on Mdina, was appointed Generale Commandante of the army. The first battalions to be set up were those of Birkirkara and Żebbuġ, which were led by Vincenzo Borg and Francesco Saverio Caruana. Vitale, Borg and Caruana became the three main leaders of the insurrection.

The Maltese acknowledged King Ferdinand of Naples and Sicily as their sovereign, and also appealed to Horatio Nelson for protection. Throughout the rest of the siege, the Maltese insurgents were aided by the British, Neapolitans and Portuguese. In 1799, Czar Paul I of Russia sent a diplomat to the insurgents promising his support and protection.

The Maltese insurgents made a number of successful assaults throughout the course of the siege, including the capture of St. Thomas Tower and St. Julian's Tower. The insurgents did not manage to capture the major fortifications, such as the city of Valletta, the Cottonera Lines, Fort Manoel and Fort Tigné, but they managed to prevent the French from retaking land outside the fortified positions. Throughout the course of the siege, the Maltese constructed a number of camps, batteries, redoubts and entrenchments surrounding the French-occupied harbour area. The most important insurgent fortifications were the Corradino Batteries, Għargħar Battery, Tal-Borg Battery and Tas-Samra Battery.

At its peak, the army consisted of 10,000 men, of which 2,505 were men-at-arms.

The French eventually capitulated to the British on 4 September 1800. The Maltese battalions were disbanded by British Civil Commissioner Alexander Ball on 11 September.

Between 1800 and 1801, gold and silver medals were struck to commemorate the blockade, and were awarded to leaders and distinguished members of the National Congress Battalions. These are now among the most highly prized Maltese medals.

== Structure ==
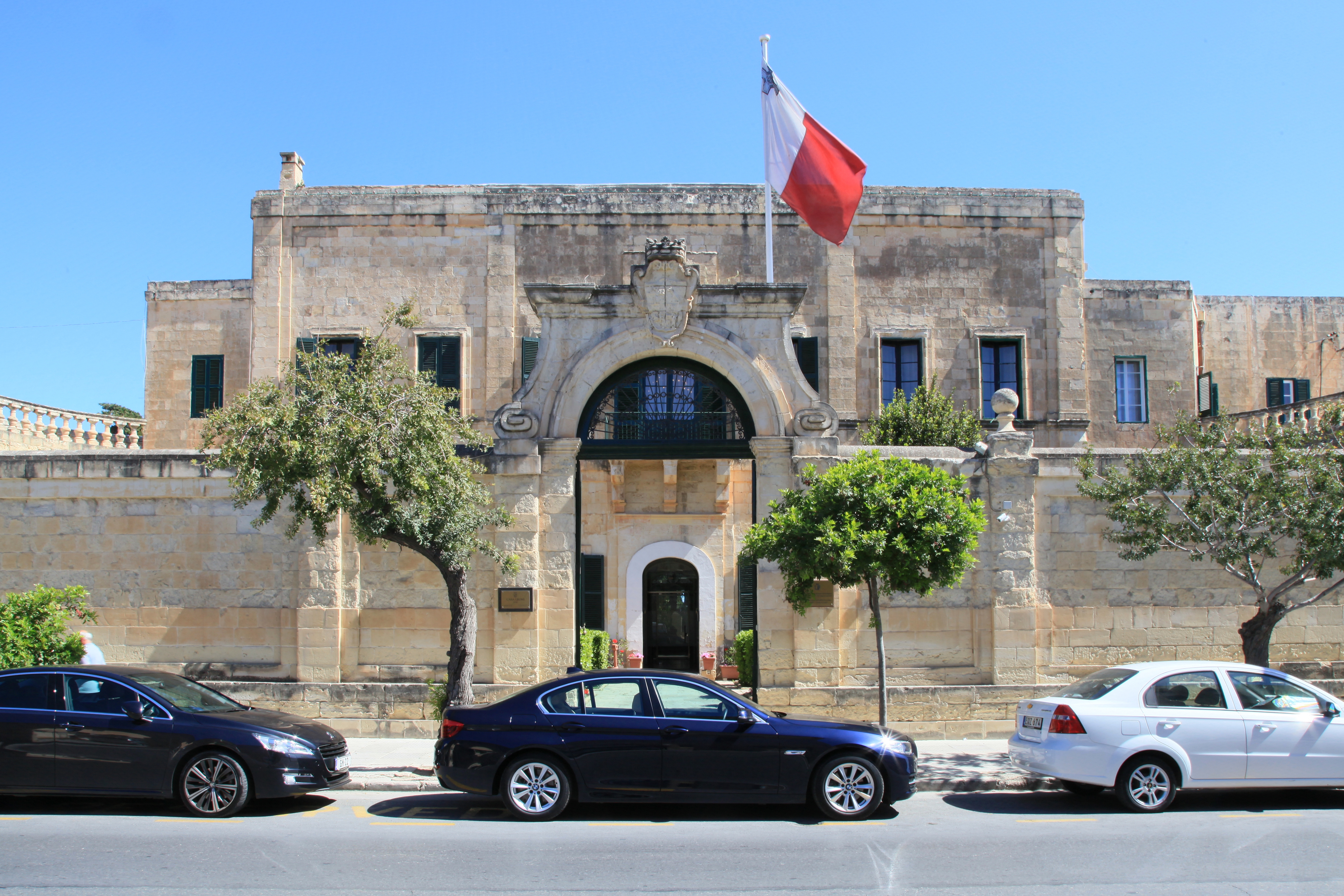
Casa Leoni, which served as an insurgent command base

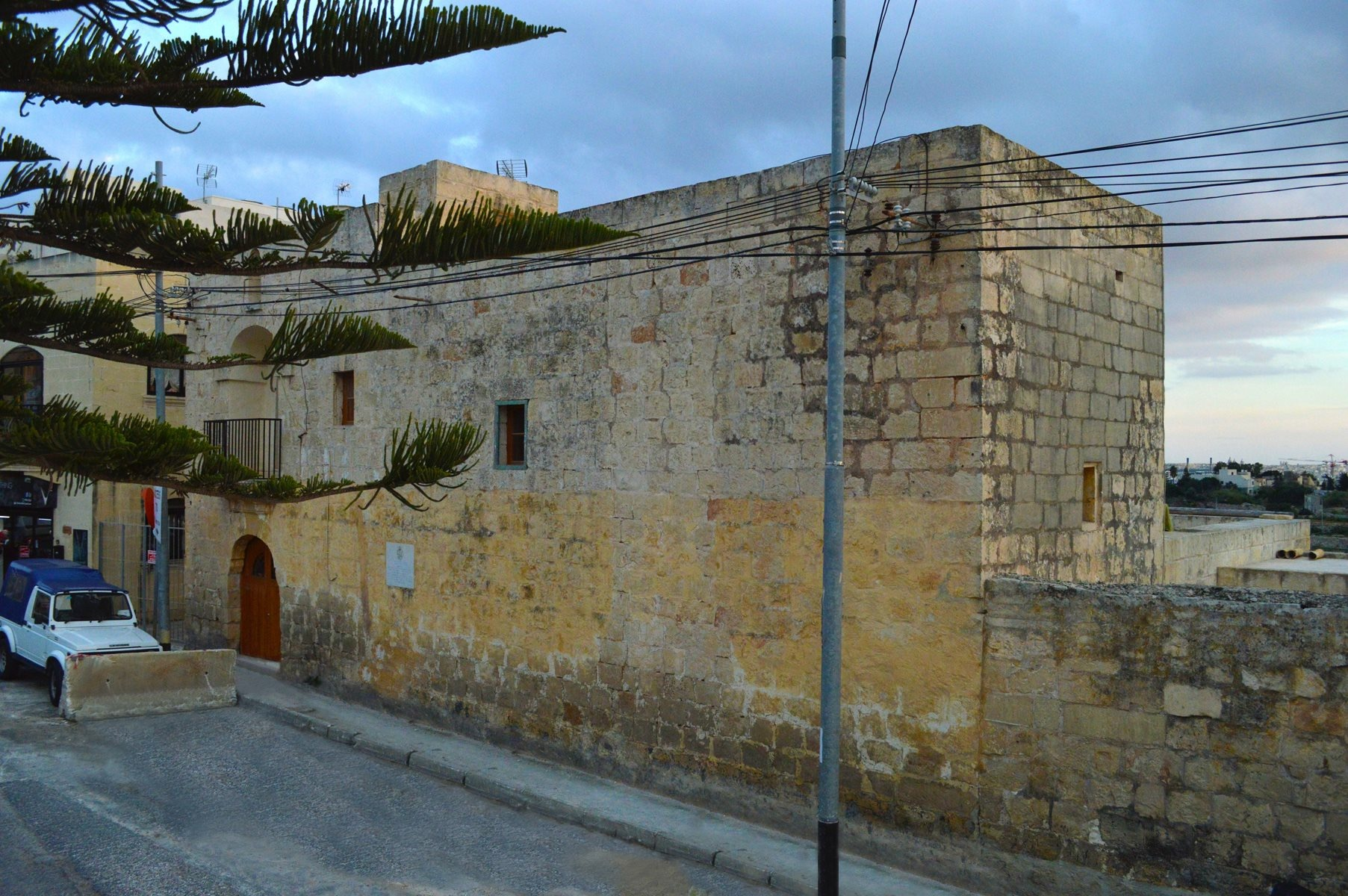
Ta' Xindi Farmhouse, which served as Vincenzo Borg's field headquarters. It is one of the few surviving landmarks of the blockade.

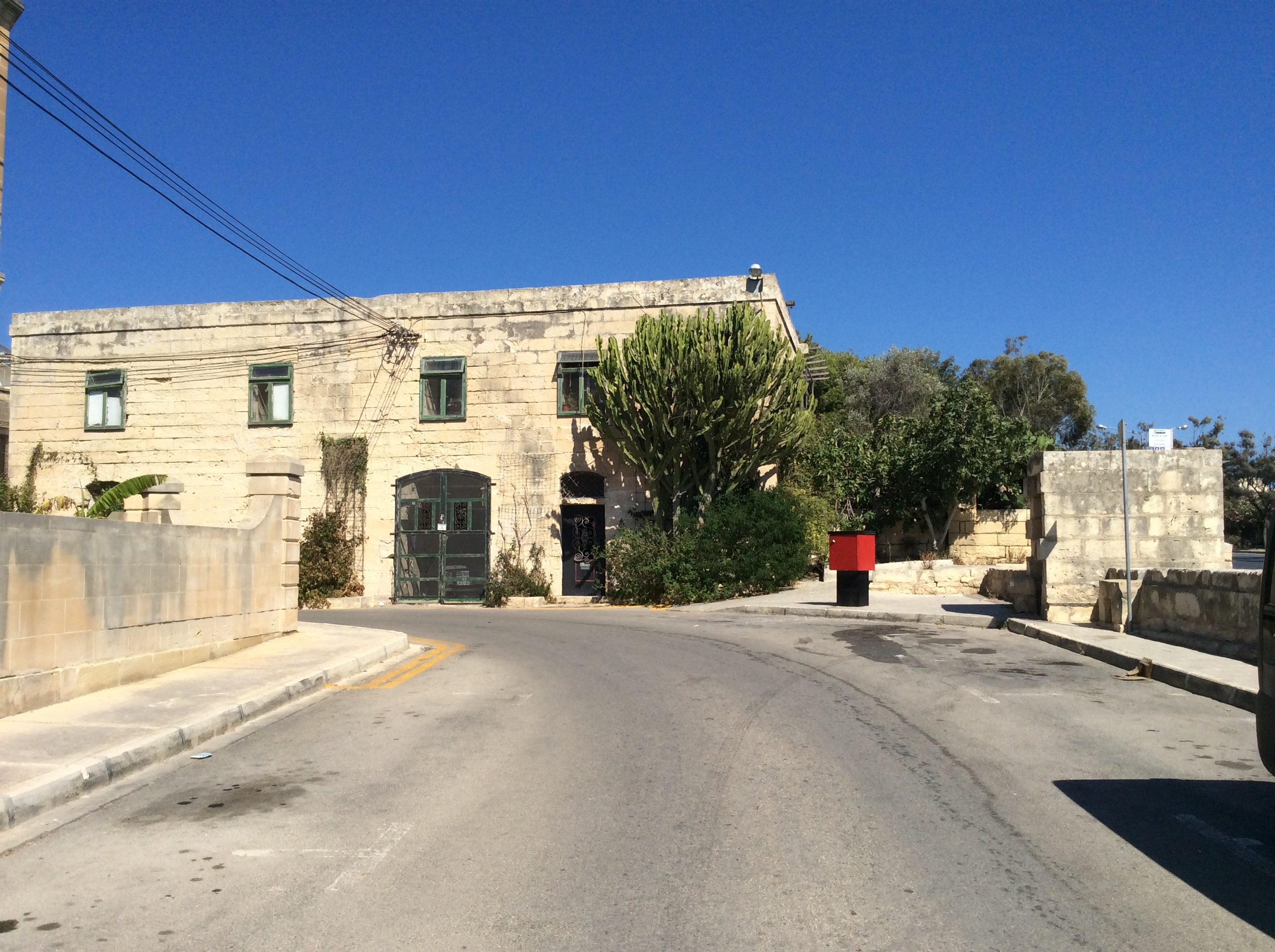
Windmill used as an observation post by the Maltese in Birkirkara. The windmill's tower, and its sails, no longer exist. The Wignacourt Aqueduct can be seen on the right.

The army was made up of the following battalions:

- Birkirkara Battalion
- Għaxaq Battalion
- Kirkop Battalion
- Mqabba Battalion
- Qormi Battalion
- Żabbar Battalion
- Żebbuġ Battalion
- Żejtun Battalion
- Żurrieq Battalion

The battalions were divided into companies and platoons. Some of the larger battalions had artillery and engineer sections, as well as military bands.

A grenadier company known as the Granatieri was also established, and it was responsible for guard duties at Casa Leoni in Santa Venera.

The majority of the army did not have uniforms, but the Birkirkara Battalion was supplied with locally made cotton uniforms. The Generale Commandante, the general staff, the Granatieri and some artillery units also had their own uniforms.

== Weapons ==
At the outbreak of the rebellion, the insurgents were poorly armed, having only hunting rifles, muskets captured from several armouries, and a few swords, pistols and locally made pikes. Between 19 and 24 September 1798, the Portuguese Navy and Royal Navy supplied the insurgents with a large number of muskets and cartridge boxes.

The Maltese also had artillery pieces captured from various coastal fortifications such as Saint Mary's Tower and Mistra Battery. These were taken to the many insurgent positions encircling the harbour area.
