= Ta' Xindi Farmhouse =

- Ir-Razzett ta' Xindi
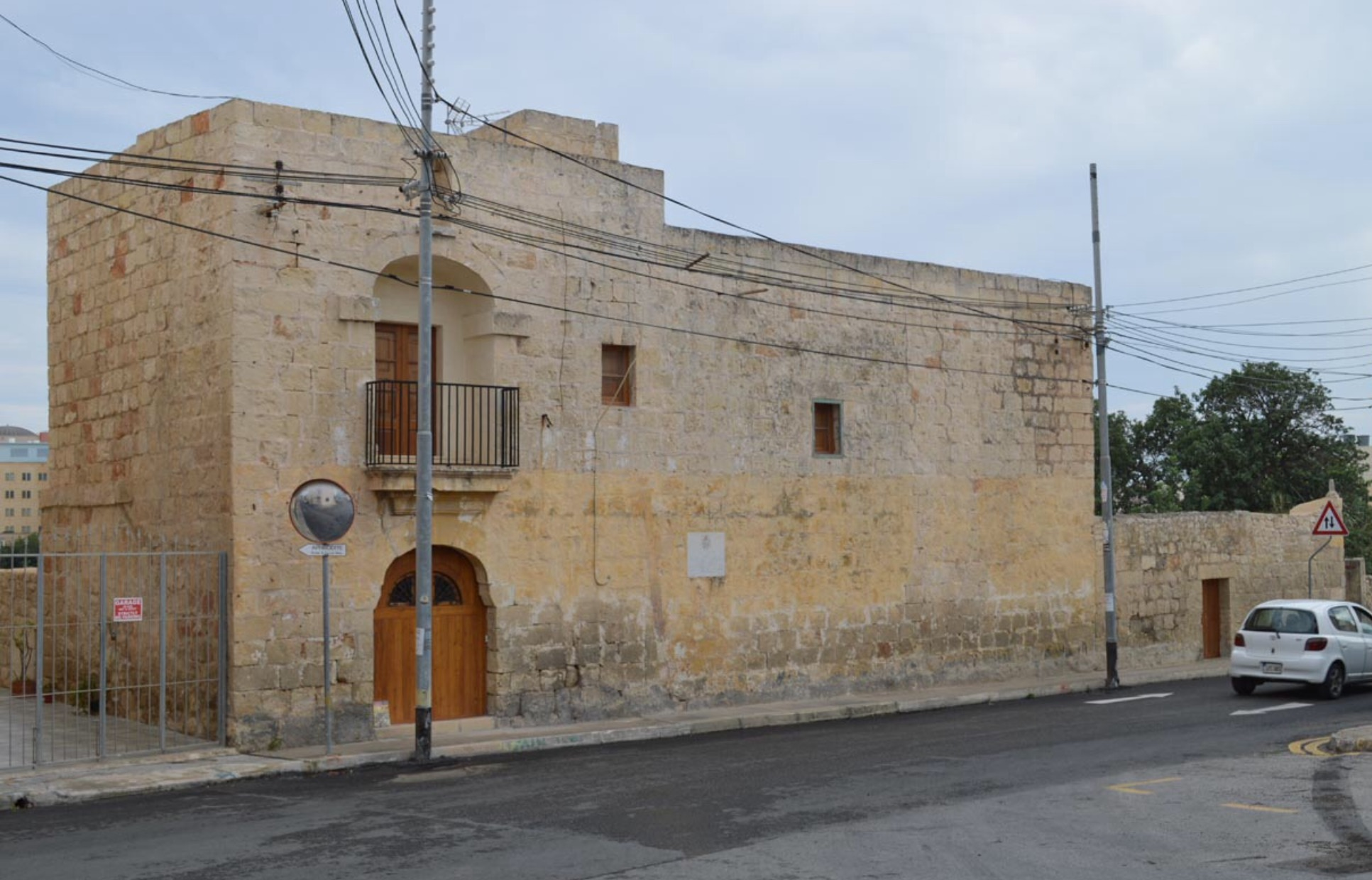
- View of Ta' Xindi Farmhouse
- Interactive map of Ta' Xindi Farmhouse

General information
- Status: Intact
- Type: Farmhouse; Headquarters; Residential
- Architectural style: Vernacular
- Location: San Ġwann, Malta
- Coordinates: 35°54′20.8″N 14°28′38.1″E
- Completed: 18th-century
- Renovated: 1798 and sometimes in the early 21st century

Technical details
- Material: Limestone
- Floor count: 2

Ta' Xindi Farmhouse (Maltese: Ir-Razzett ta' Xindi), also known as the Ta' Xindi Headquarters and Kappara Outpost, is an 18th-century farmhouse built during the Order of St. John in San Ġwann, Malta. It was originally designed to be a farmhouse but went through different adaptive reuse.

The building served as a farmhouse for two hundred years and is found in the suburb of Kappara. During the brief French occupation of Malta, the building served as the headquarters for the rise of the Maltese against the French, known as the Gharghar rise and led by the building's owner Vincenzo Borg. A plaque was attached on the façade, during the British period, commemorating Borg's role in the revolt.

The building came to national attention when it was mentioned in the Maltese Parliament by Prime Minister Lawrence Gonzi, then followed by its scheduling by the Malta Environment and Planning Authority. Today the building is a national cultural monument. The building is a private property and following its refurbishment it is used as a residential home.

== Description and Location ==
The Ta' Xindi Farmhouse was built by unknown Maltese farmers sometime during the period of Hospitaller rule in Malta. It is a vernacular building with a modest design, built according to local customs to function like any other farm of its time. When the building was constructed, it was located within the limits of Birkirkara, but today is under the jurisdiction of the San Ġwann Local Council, in a suburb known as Kappara. The farmhouse is situated on a hill overlooking farmland along with the Mater Dei Hospital.

== History ==
By the late 18th century the building belonged to Vincenzo Borg, a main insurgent leaders during the French blockade of 1798–1800 and previously a leading cotton merchants in Malta whose sale of products called brared led to his nickname, Brared. In 1798, Malta was invaded by the French led by Napoleon Bonaparte who were on their way to conquer Egypt. After expelling the Hospitallers from the islands, Napoleon left a garrison of 4000 men in order to keep control of the Maltese archipelago.

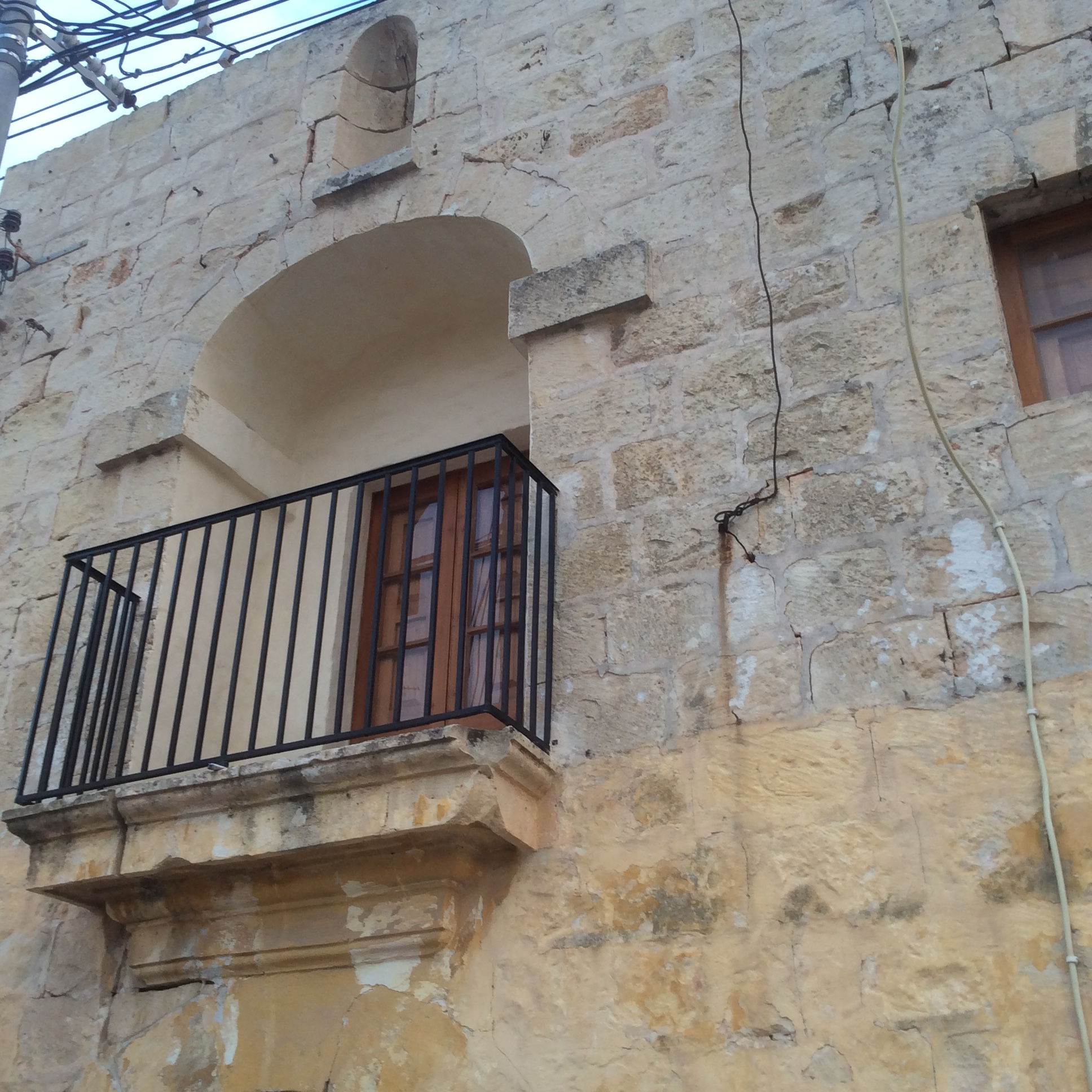
The balcony and niche at Ta' Xindi Farmhouse

Initially the Maltese had supported the French but having not received what they expected, growing in disappointment and propagated by landlords and the Catholic Church, the Maltese rose up against the French in different battalions around Malta. In such context the Ta' Xindi Farmhouse became also known since then as the San Ġwann Headquarters when Vincenzo Borg took the lead for the rising against the French, famously known as the Gharghar rise. Vincenzo Labini, the then bishop of Malta, was well informed about the insurgency of the Maltese. Alexander Ball initially did not trust Vincenzo Borg in the belief that Borg was after power over the Maltese.

During the conflict the farmhouse, now an outpost, was secretly used as headquarters while the French soldiers kept control of the fortifications of Malta. The building manned more than 550 native Maltese soldiers of mixed capacities. The soldiers safeguarded and over the surrounding areas and generally attacked at once with other outposts such as Birkirkara and Mosta. On 2 September the Maltese resurgence managed to acquire two 18-pounder cannons that were stored and at times used at the farmhouse. The flag of Great Britain was raised for the very first time in Malta in 1799 by Vincenzo Borg himself of which a plaque was inaugurated on the façade of the farmhouse that includes this historic event.

During the insurgency the farmhouse was also used as an emergency hospital. Despite being small, the building had to cater as a hospital for a large number of families which included people who took refuge in the countryside from the fortified cities that were occupied by the French.

In 1833 Borg was awarded the Order of St. Michael and St. George by the British. John Hookham Frere had such a good friendship with, and an appreciation for Vincenzo Borg's role against the French that when Borg died Frere had inscribed by documenting this on Borg's grave at the St Helen's Basilica in Birkirkara.

== Recent ==
The farmhouse came to public attention to be preserved after some sections of it were being demolished during refurbishment. Back then Prime Minister in Office Lawrence Gonzi has made reference to the farmhouse and its rich history. Since then measures of preservation have taken place. The building remains to be a private residence and not a museum. It is currently being used by its owners as a family home. A plaque is found on the façade of the building, commemorating the Gharghar rise against the French and Vincenzo Borg's heroic role at the same time.

=== Plaque ===
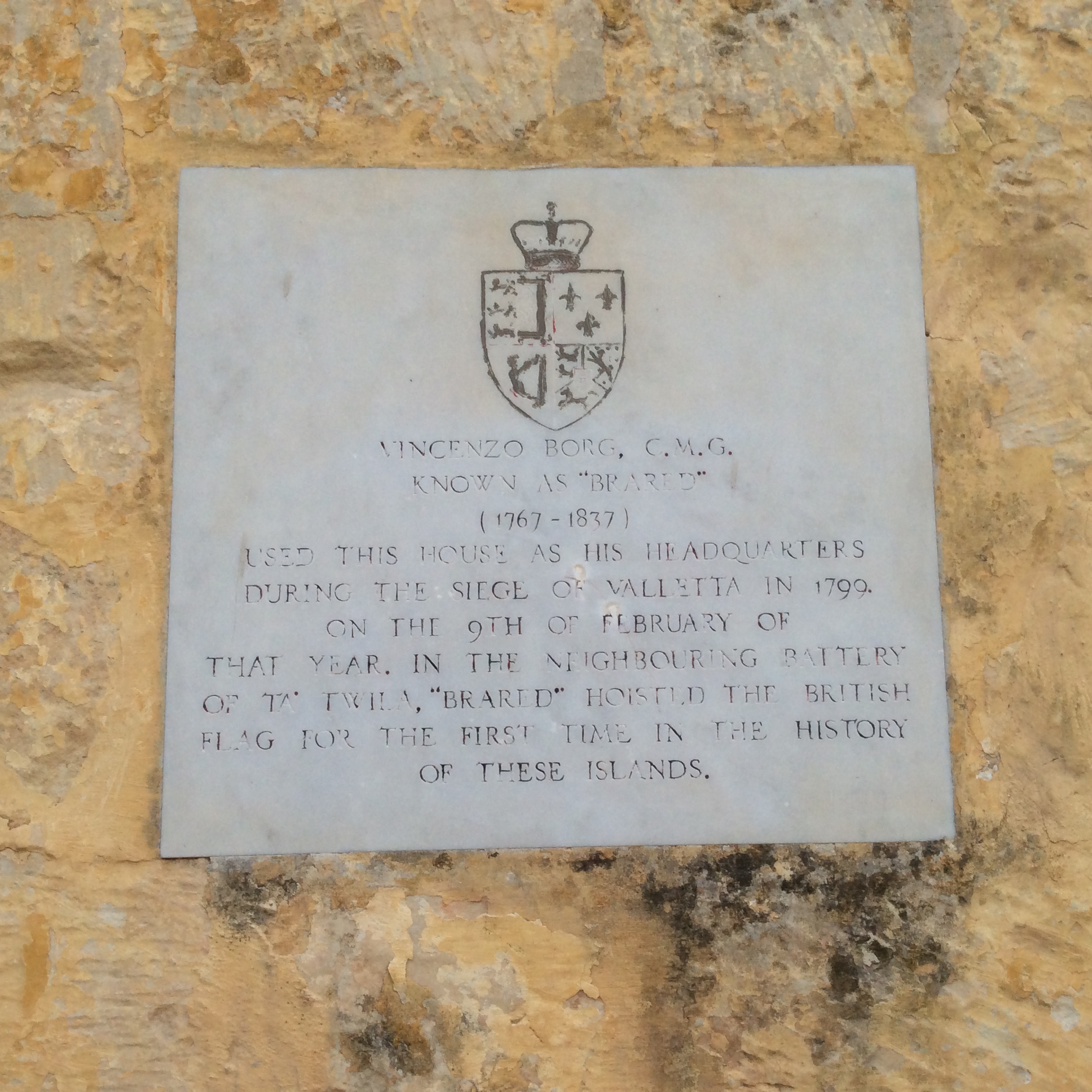
Commemorative plaque on the façade of Ta' Xindi Farmhouse

On the commemorative plaque it is written:

Vincenzo Borg C. M. G.

Known As "Brared"
(1767-1837)
Used This House As His Headquarters
During The Siege of Valletta in 1799.
On The 9th of February Of
That Year. In The Neighbouring Battery
Of Ta' Twila, "Brared" Hoisted The British
Flag For The Very First Time In The History
Of These Islands.

== Heritage ==
The Ta' Xindi Farmhouse is scheduled by the Malta Environment and Planning Authority (MEPA) as grade 1 national monument. It is also listed on the National Inventory of the Cultural Property of the Maltese Islands.
