= Vincenzo Borg =

Maltese insurgent and merchant ( 1773 died 1837)

Vincenzo Borg C.M.G.
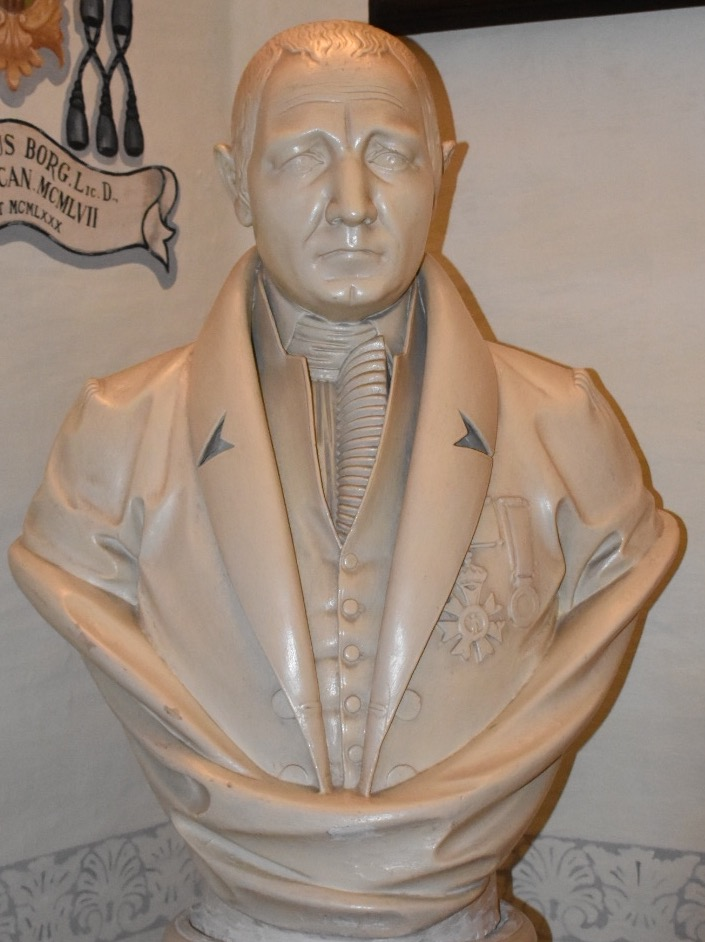
- Bust of Vincenzo Borg, "Brared", at the St Helen's Basilica Museum with the Maltese Blockade Gold Medal. Sculpted by Salvu Psaila.
- Born: 11 January 1777; Birkirkara, Hospitaller Malta
- Died: 18 July 1837 (aged 60); Malta
- Burial place: Collegiate Parish Church of Birkirkara
- Other name: Brared
- Occupations: Merchant and lieutenant
- Military career
- Allegiance: Malta
- Branch: National Congress Battalions
- Conflicts: Siege of Malta (1798–1800)
- Awards: Pro Patria gold medal (1801); Companion of the Order of St Michael and St George (1833)

Vincenzo Maria Borg (Maltese: Ċensu Maria Borg, 1773 – 18 July 1837), also known by his nickname Brared (or Braret), was a Maltese merchant who was one of the main insurgent leaders during the French blockade of 1798–1800. He was a lieutenant from 1801 until he was deposed in January 1804.

== Life ==
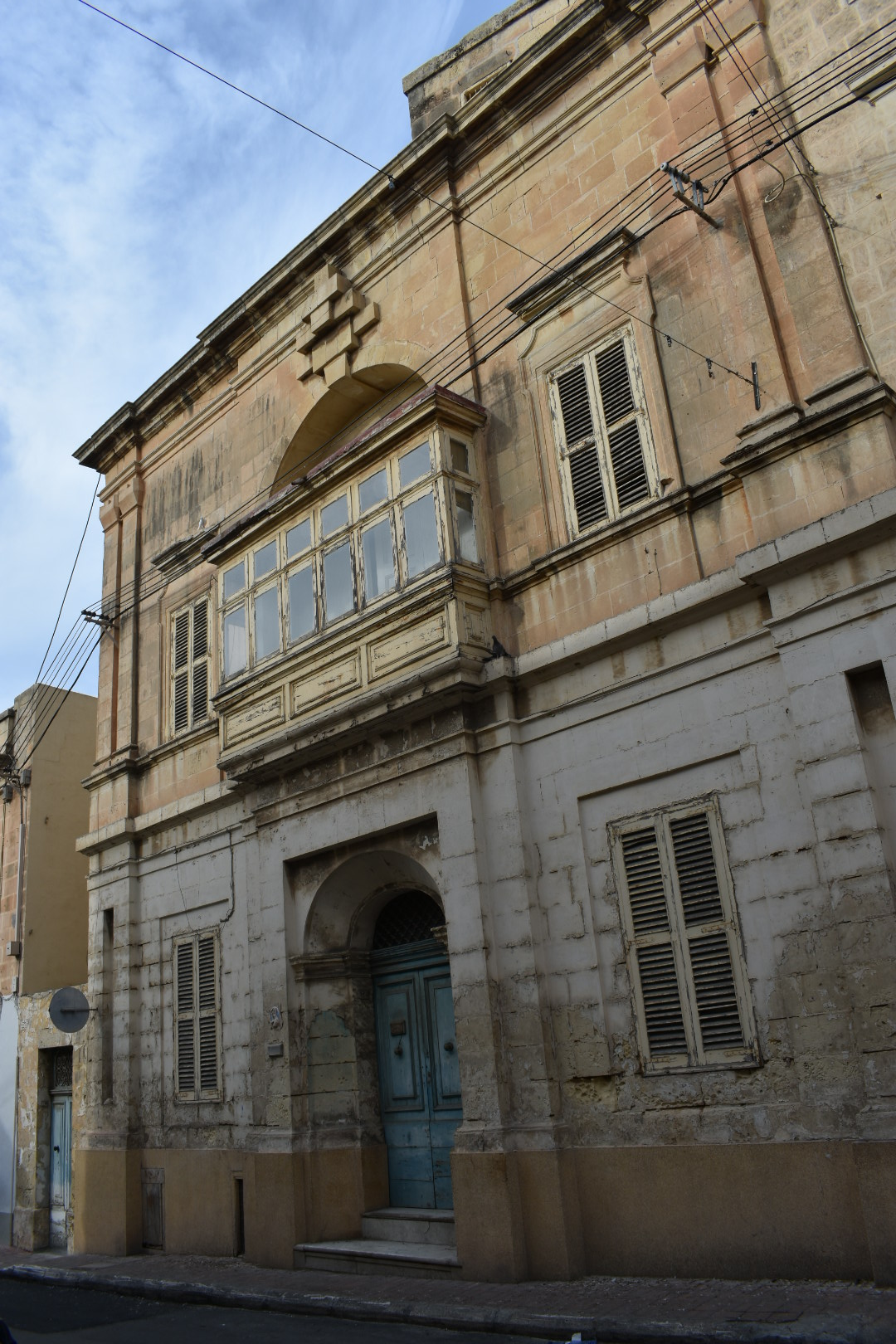
Residence of Vincenzo Borg, located at 84, Triq Santu Rokku, Birkirkara. It was used as a school and as a hospital. It has a unique Muxrabija on a tower at the top of the house.

Ċensu Borg, nicknamed Brared, was born in 1773 in the town of Birkirkara. He was one of the leading cotton merchants in Malta, and a popular figure on the island. As part of his business, he used to sell products called brared (singular: barrada) and thus originated his nickname.

When the Maltese rebelled against the French occupation in 1798, Brared was chosen by the inhabitants of Birkirkara and Mosta as their leader. He was in charge of the largest battalion among the insurgent army, and became one of the main leaders in the uprising, along with Emmanuele Vitale and Francesco Saverio Caruana. He financed a number of soldiers throughout the blockade.

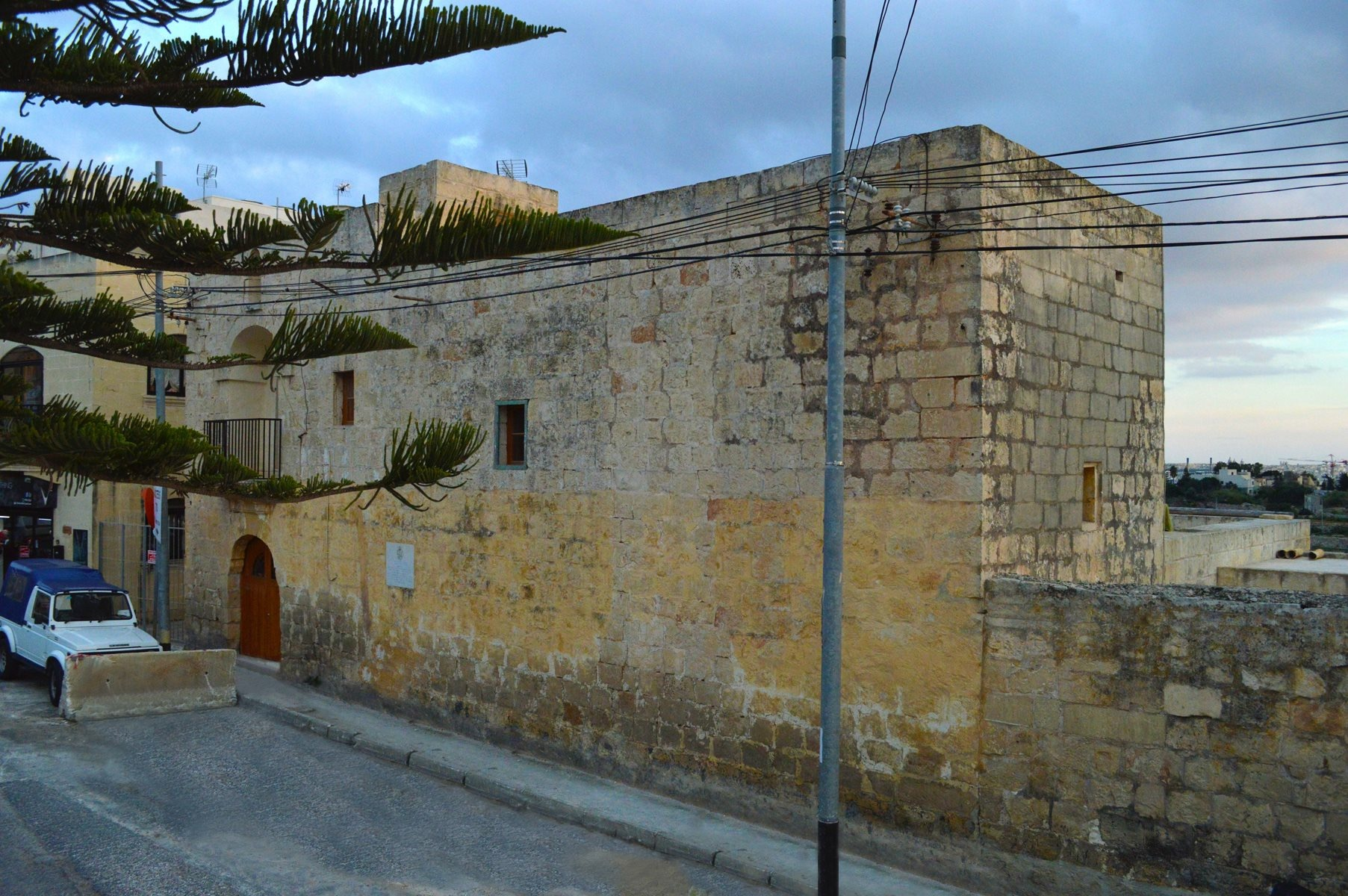
Ta' Xindi Farmhouse, Brared's field headquarters in 1798–1800

Throughout the blockade, capomastri under Brared's command built a number of batteries to bombard French positions and prevent a counterattack, including Għargħar Battery, Ta' Għemmuna Battery and several batteries at Sliema. Brared had his field headquarters at Ta' Xindi Farmhouse, today one of the few surviving landmarks of the blockade.

On 4 February 1799, Brared suggested to Captain Alexander Ball that Malta be placed under British protection, and he hoisted the first British flag on the island. On 2 February 1801, Brared was awarded the gold Pro Patria medal in recognition of his role in the blockade. He became the lieutenant of Birkirkara and Mosta from 1801 to 1804. He quarreled with Ball in January 1804 due to alleged political intrigues, and was placed under house arrest. He was made a companion of the Order of St Michael and St George on 9 February 1833.

Brared died on 18 July 1837, and was buried in the parish church of his hometown Birkirkara.
