= Tal-Borg Battery =

Former artillery battery in Malta

- Batterija tal-Borg
- Part of the French blockade batteries
- Tarxien, Malta
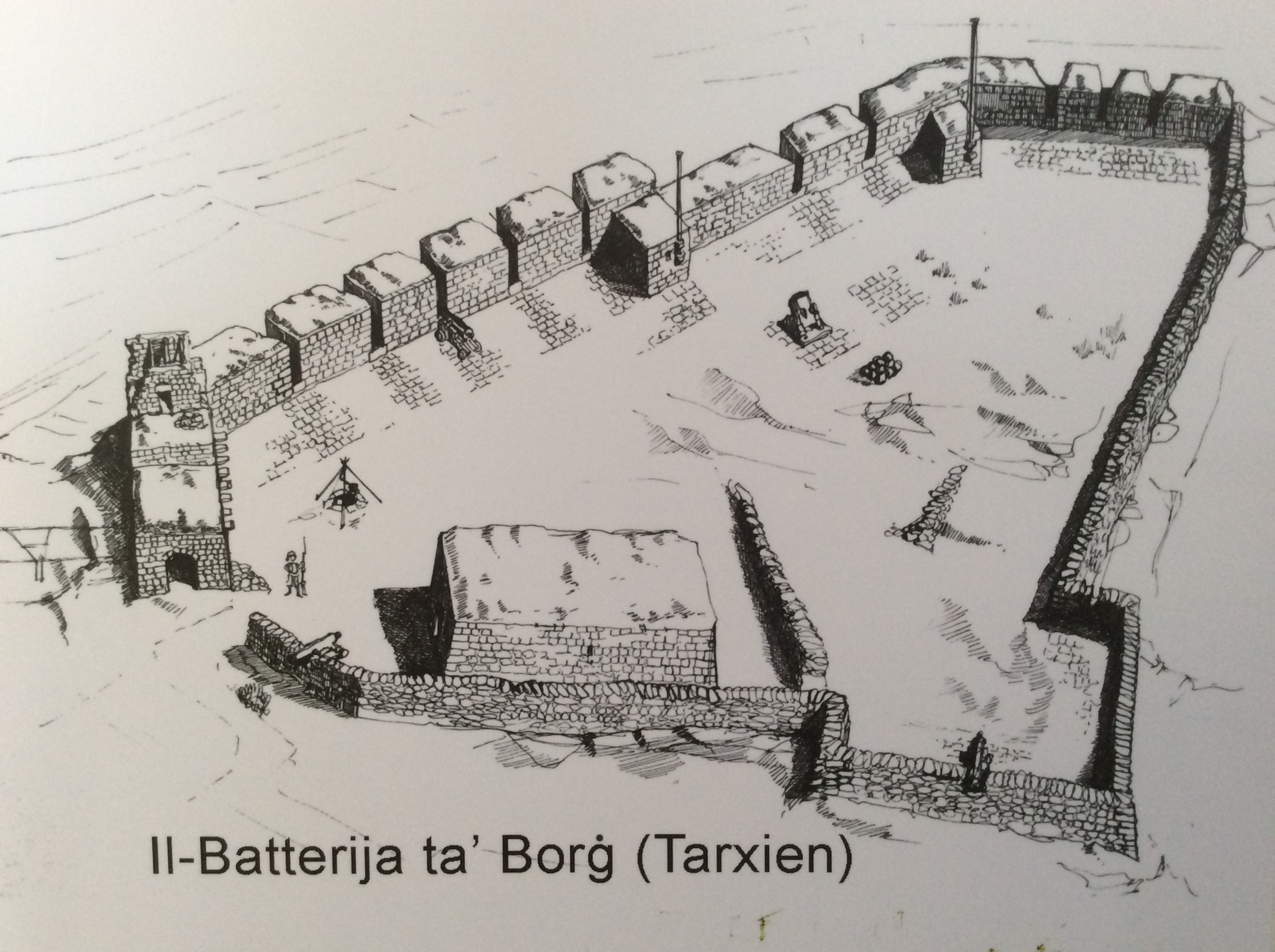
- Reconstruction of Tal-Borg Battery by Stephen C. Spiteri at the Fortifications Interpretation Centre

Site information
- Type: Artillery battery

Location
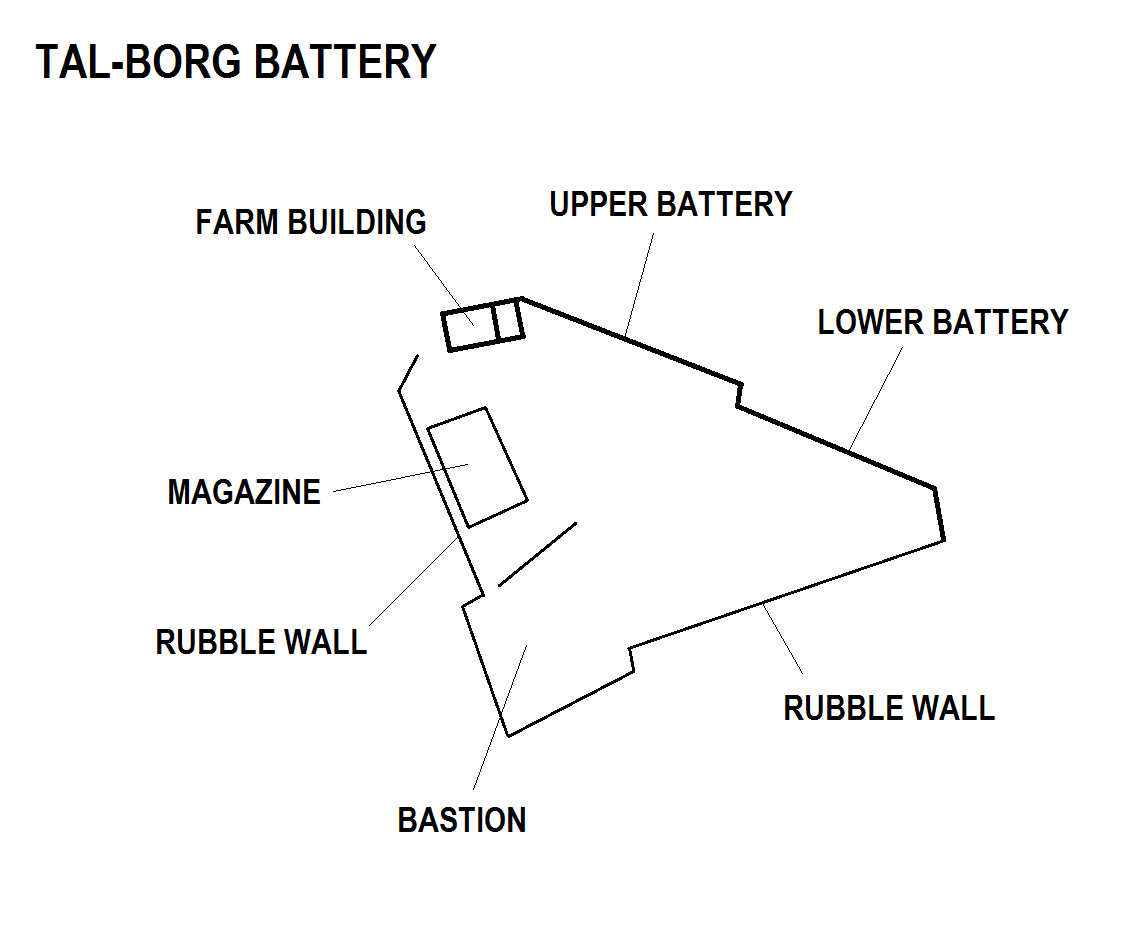
- Map of Tal-Borg Battery
- Coordinates: 35°52′19.7″N 14°30′41.2″E

Site history
- Built: 1798
- Built by: Maltese insurgents
- In use: 1798–1800
- Materials: Limestone
- Fate: Demolished
- Battles/wars: Siege of Malta (1798–1800)

Flags flown from
Tal-Borg Battery

Blue Ensign

Flag of Sicily

Tal-Borg Battery (Maltese: Batterija tal-Borg) was an artillery battery near Tarxien, Malta, built by Maltese insurgents during the French blockade of 1798–1800. It was part of a chain of batteries, redoubts and entrenchments encircling the French positions in Marsamxett and the Grand Harbour.

== Description ==
Tal-Borg Battery was located north of Tarxien, and about 700m away from St. John Almoner Bastion of the Santa Margherita Lines. It faced Corradino (where the insurgents also built a series of batteries), as well as the Cottonera Lines. The battery was one of the largest and best defended Maltese batteries throughout the siege.

Tal-Borg Battery consisted of a paved gun platform, with an upper and lower parapet. The upper parapet was seven courses high and had five embrasures. The west side of the upper parapet was flanked by a partially demolished farm building, which served as a protective shelter for the garrison and gun crews. A well was also located near the farm building. A large barrack building or magazine with its roof covered by a layer of soil was located at the rear of the platform. A small bastion was built next to the barracks, and this was connected to the lower parapet by a rubble wall entrenchment. The lower parapet had at least five embrasures. The battery also had two sentry rooms, which had flagpoles flying the Blue Ensign and the flag of the Kingdom of Sicily.

The upper platform was armed with five iron guns, two 6-inch mortars and a carronade. The lower platform was armed with two guns, while another gun was located near the battery's entrance.

== History ==
The battery was built on a field belonging to Caterina Busuttil, who received 142 scudi in compensation. It was built under the supervision of the engineer Michele Cachia and had a garrison of 230 men.

By the beginning of 1799, Tal-Borg Battery had fired over 400 shells to Cospicua and Senglea, damaging many houses within the cities. On 15 September 1799, three gunners at Tal-Borg were killed by French bombardment. On 23 February 1800, the battery fired across the harbour, hitting a ferry boat that was discharging passengers at Birgu, killing many civilians. On 4 March of the same year, French cannonball destroyed a gunpowder magazine near the battery.

Like the other French blockade fortifications, Tal-Borg Battery was dismantled, possibly sometime after 1814. No traces of the battery can be seen today, and its site is now occupied by the Pace Grasso Stadium.
