= Għargħar Battery =

- Batterija tal-Għargħar
- Part of the French blockade batteries
- San Ġwann, Malta
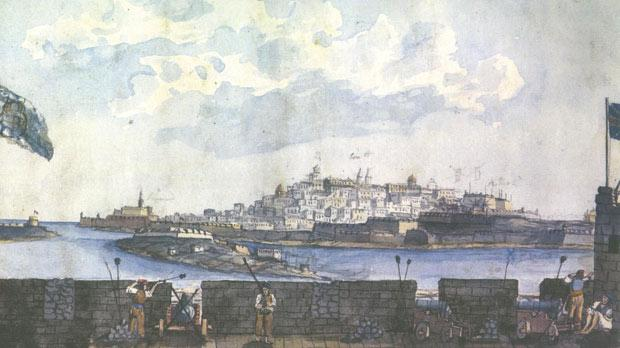
- Watercolour of Għargħar Battery overlooking Manoel Island and Valletta

Site information
- Type: Artillery battery

Location
- Coordinates: 35°54′25.6″N 14°28′52.3″E

Site history
- Built: 1798
- Built by: Maltese insurgents
- In use: 1798–1800
- Materials: Limestone
- Fate: Demolished
- Battles/wars: Siege of Malta (1798–1800)

Flags flown from
Għargħar Battery

White Ensign

Flag of Sicily

Għargħar Battery (Maltese: Batterija tal-Għargħar), also known as Ta' Ittuila Battery (Maltese: Batterija ta' Ittuila) and Ta' Xindi Battery (Maltese: Batterija ta' Xindi), was an artillery battery in present-day San Ġwann, Malta, built by Maltese insurgents during the French blockade of 1798–1800. It was part of a chain of batteries, redoubts and entrenchments encircling the French positions in Marsamxett Harbour and the Grand Harbour.

== Location ==
Għargħar Battery was located in an area known as San Ġwann tal-Għargħar, which is now part of San Ġwann. It overlooked Gżira and Manoel Island, on which there was the French-occupied Fort Manoel.

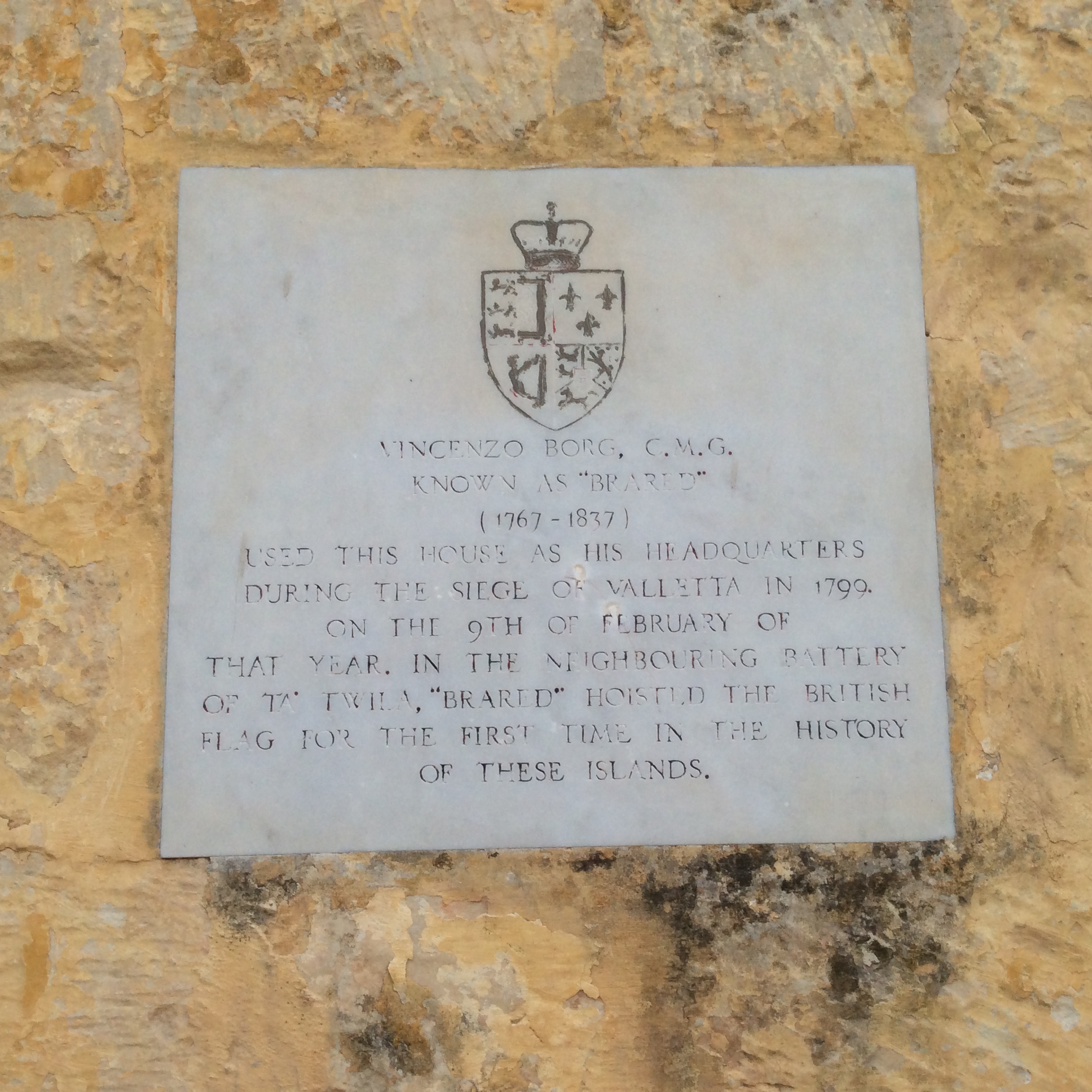
Plaque at Ta' Xindi Farmhouse, making a reference to the raising of the British flag at Għargħar Battery

== Description ==
The battery had a linear gun platform and a high masonry parapet with six embrasures. The battery had flanking walls on either side of the platform, and a high rubble wall at the rear. Sentry boxes were located in at least three of the four corners of the battery. Two of these were fitted with flagpoles flying the White Ensign and the flag of the Kingdom of Sicily. Għargħar Battery is significant as being the first place where the British flag was raised in Malta. The battery also had a vaulted underground casemate for the accommodation of the garrison.

=== History ===
The battery was built by Vincenzo Borg, and was completed by 6 October 1798. It was armed with five 18-pounder cannons, some of which were taken from Mistra Battery. The battery had an advanced post at Il-Ħarrub ta' Stiefnu, which was armed with a single gun. The battery's garrison consisted of 338 men in December 1799.

Għargħar Battery tried to fire on the capital Valletta, but it was too far away and the bombardment had little effect on it. The French attempted to attack the battery in 1799 but were driven back.

Għargħar Battery still existed in 1811, but like the other French blockade fortifications, it was dismantled, possibly after 1814. No traces of the battery can be seen today, and the area is now built up. According to Arnold Cassola, some remains still existed in 2016.

== See also ==
- Ta' Xindi Farmhouse
