= Mistra Battery =

Artillery battery in Mistra Bay, Mellieħa, Malta

- Batterija tal-Mistra
- Mellieħa, Malta
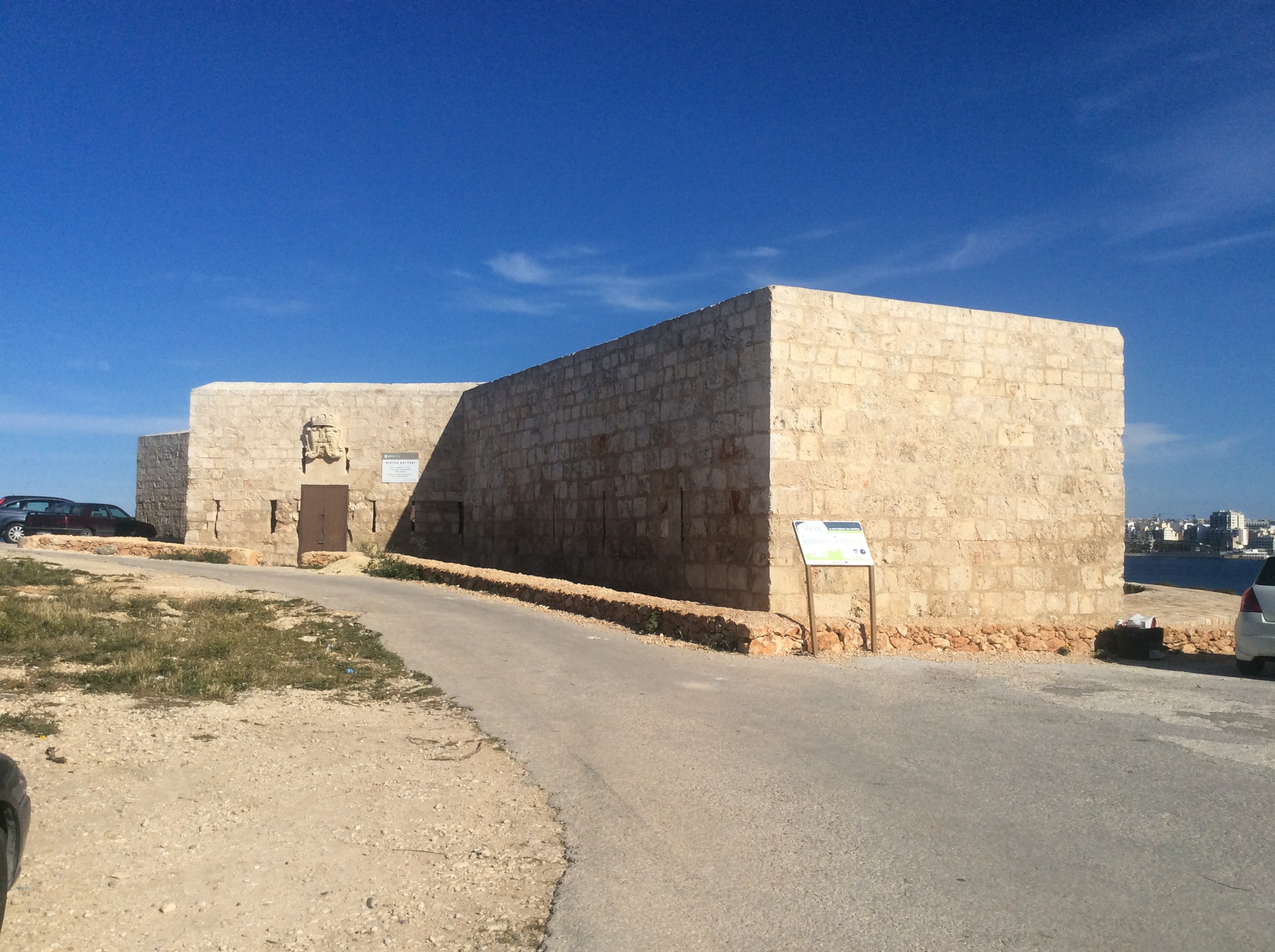
- Mistra Battery's redan and blockhouses

Site information
- Type: Artillery battery
- Owner: Government of Malta
- Controlled by: Fondazzjoni Wirt Artna
- Open to the public: No
- Condition: Intact

Location
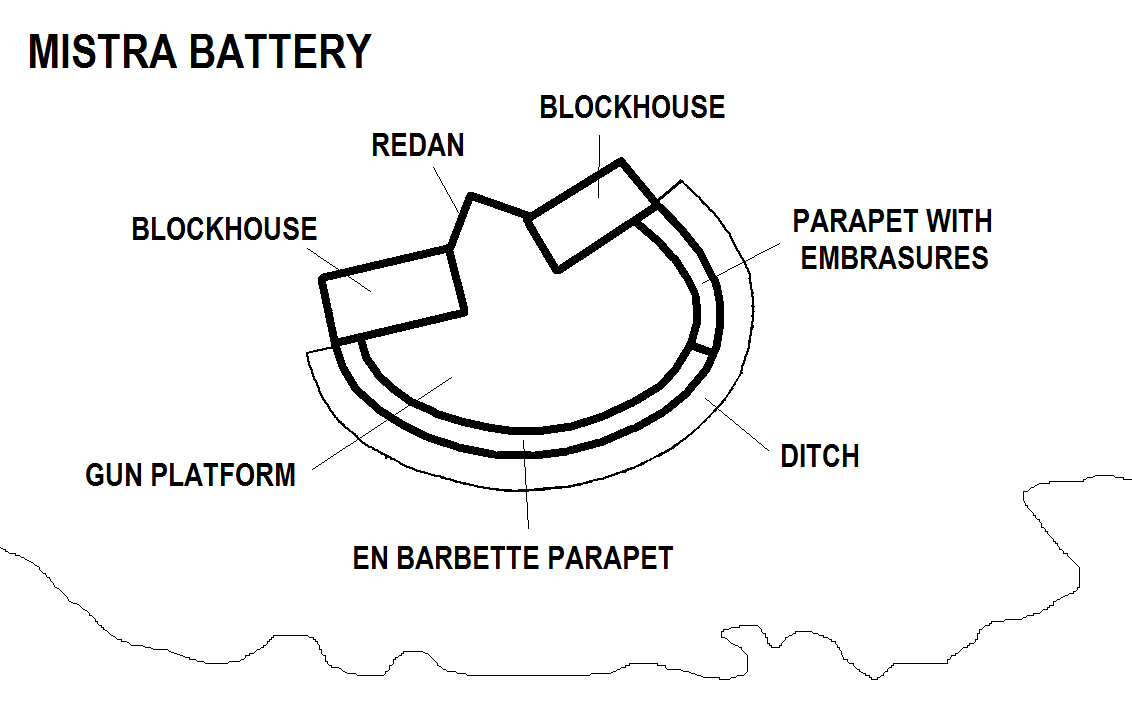
- Map of Mistra Battery
- Coordinates: 35°57′30.48″N 14°23′41.86″E

Site history
- Built: c. 1761
- Built by: Order of Saint John
- In use: c. 1761–1798
- Materials: Limestone

Mistra Battery (Maltese: Batterija tal-Mistra), formerly also known as Despirasse Battery (Maltese: Batterija ta' Despirasse), is an artillery battery in Mistra Bay, Mellieħa, Malta. It was built by the Order of Saint John in the 18th century as one of a series of coastal fortifications around the coasts of the Maltese Islands.

The battery is considered as the best preserved of the Order's batteries in Malta, since it retains all of its original features. Many other batteries have been destroyed or otherwise modified, and very few have survived in their original state.

== History ==
The first plans to construct a battery at Mistra Bay were made in 1714, where the knight Mongontier donated 133 scudi for its construction. The battery does not appear in the 1715-1716 list of coastal fortifications, but possibly a gun platform was built some years later. However, the battery as it is today was built over forty years later in 1761 due to the insistence by the military engineer Bourlamaque, during the reign of Grand Master Manuel Pinto da Fonseca.

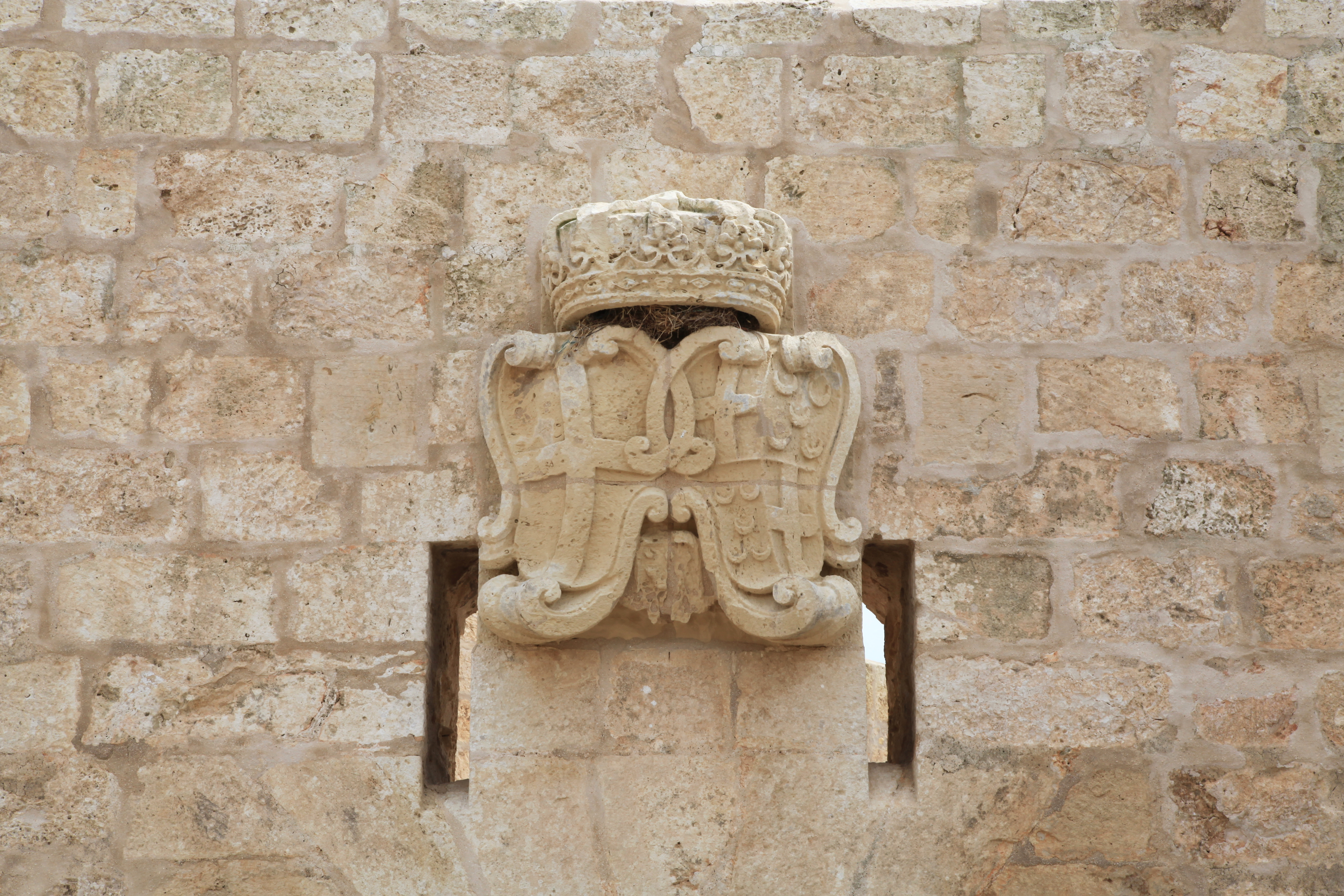
Coats of arms of the Order, Pinto and the Bailli de Montagnac above the main entrance

The battery has a roughly semi-circular gun platform, with its northern face having a parapet with three embrasures. There was no parapet around the rest of the platform. The battery is partially surrounded by a shallow rock hewn ditch that was left unfinished. The battery has two blockhouses, which are linked together by a redan with musketry loopholes. The redan also contains the main entrance, which is surmounted by the coats of arms of the Order, of Grand Master Pinto and of the Bailli de Montagnac.

When completed in 1761, the battery had an armament of three 24-pounder and six 8-pounder iron cannons. By 1770, the armament was reduced to just a single 8-pounder cannon, and all armaments were removed by 1785. The battery was later rearmed once again with 18-pounder cannons. These were removed by Maltese insurgents during the French blockade of 1798-1800, and were taken to Għargħar Battery.

Mistra Battery was included on the Antiquities List of 1925, and it was the only coastal battery to be specifically mentioned in this list.

== Present day ==
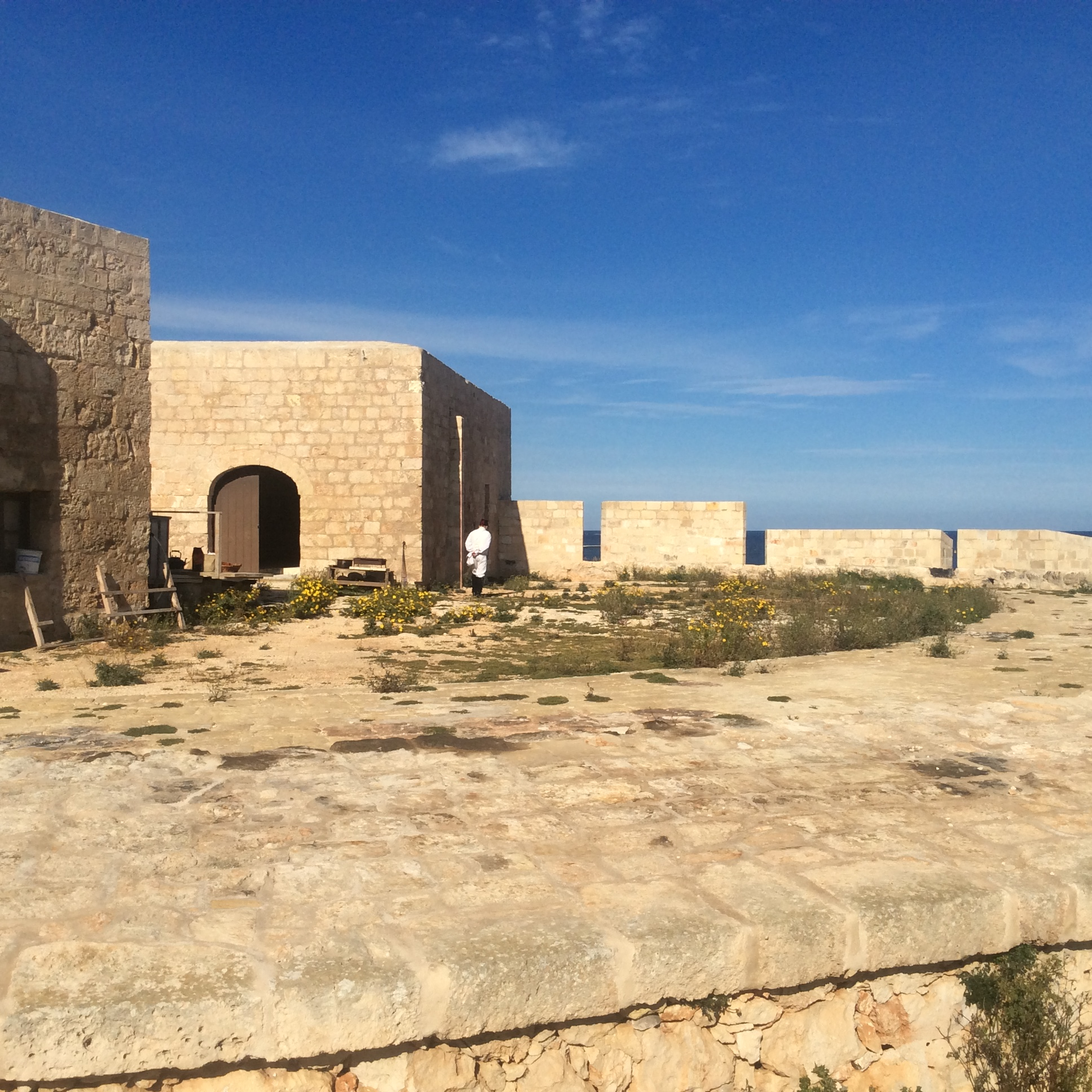
Mistra Battery's gun platform, with the rebuilt embrasures in the background

At some point, the battery's parapet with embrasures was demolished. The battery was used as a store by P2M Fisheries, and a number of alterations were made, in which some parts of the battery were destroyed.

The fisheries company obtained new premises in 2012 and restored the battery before returning it to the government. Despite this, the battery and the surrounding area was vandalized repeatedly.

Since then, more restoration works were undertaken by Fondazzjoni Wirt Artna. The destroyed embrasures and musketry loopholes were rebuilt, and layer of concrete over the gun platform was removed. The battery's ditch was also restored. Currently, work is being done to build replicas of the battery's cannons. The battery is currently closed to the public due to ongoing restoration works, however Fondazzjoni Wirt Artna plans to open it as a cultural attraction in 2015. As of April 2016, the battery is at final stages of restoration, but not yet open to the public (as per sign on main entrance).
