= Count of Vidigueira =

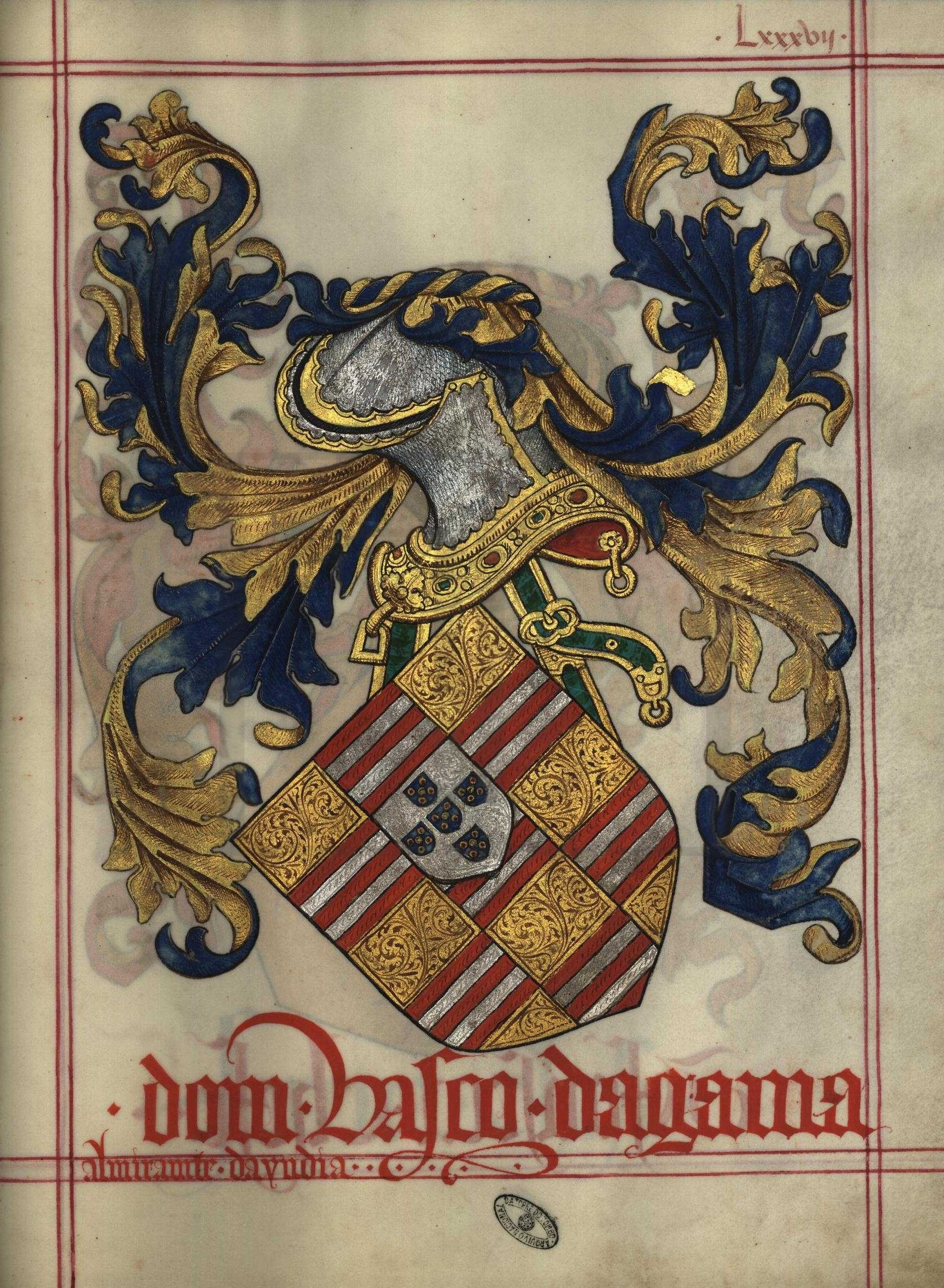
Coat of arms of the Count of Vidigueira

Count of Vidigueira (in Portuguese Conde da Vidigueira) was a Portuguese comital title of nobility awarded by King Manuel I of Portugal to Dom Vasco da Gama, who discovered the maritime route from Europe to India. The title was created by a royal decree issued in Évora on 29 December 1519, after an agreement signed in 7 November between Vasco da Gama and Dom Jaime, Duke of Braganza, who ceded him the towns of Vidigueira and Vila de Frades, granting Vasco da Gama and his heirs and successors all the revenues and privileges related.

Vasco da Gama was then the 1st Admiral of the Seas of India and in 1524 would become the 6th Governor of Portuguese India under the title of 2nd Viceroy.

Following the expulsion of the Philippine Dynasty from the throne of Portugal in 1640, the new King John IV of Portugal granted this family the new title of Marquis of Nisa (Portuguese: Marquês de Nisa) by a royal decree dated October 18, 1646.

When the 8th Marchioness and 8th Countess, Maria Josefa da Gama, married the 3rd Count of Unhão, the three titles were later inherited by their son, Rodrigo Xavier Teles de Castro da Gama (1744–1784), who became 14th Count of Vidigueira, 7th Marquis of Nisa and 5th Count of Unhão.

== List of counts of Vidigueira (1499) and Marquesses of Nisa (1646) ==
- Vasco da Gama (1469–1524), 6th Governor and 2nd Viceroy of Portuguese India, 1st Count of Vidigueira, 1st Admiral of the Seas of India;
- Francisco da Gama (1489-1545), 2nd Count of Vidigueira;
- Vasco da Gama (1530-1578), 3rd Count of Vidigueira;
- Francisco da Gama (1565–1632), 33rd Governor and 16th Viceroy and 42nd Governor and 22nd Viceroy of Portuguese India, 4th Count of Vidigueira;
- Vasco Luís da Gama (1612–1676), 5th Count of Vidigueira and 1st Marquis of Nisa;
- Francisco Luís Baltazar da Gama (1636–1707), 6th Count of Vidigueira and 2nd Marquis of Nisa;
- Vasco José Luís da Gama (1662–1735), 7th Count of Vidigueira and 3rd Marquis of Nisa;
- Maria Josefa da Gama (1712–1750), 8th Countess of Vidigueira and 4th Marchioness of Nisa;
- Vasco José da Gama (1733–1757), 9th Count of Vidigueira and 5th Marquis of Nisa;
- Rodrigo Xavier Teles de Castro da Gama (1744–1784), 10th Count of Vidigueira, 6th Marquis of Nisa and 6th Count of Unhão;
- Eugénia Maria Teles de Castro da Gama (1776–1839), 11th Countess of Vidigueira, 7th Marchioness of Nisa and 7th Countess of Unhão; her husband was Domingos Xavier de Lima (Marquess consort of Nisa), Rear-Admiral during the Siege of Malta;
- Tomás Xavier Teles de Castro da Gama (1796–1820), 12th Count of Vidigueira, 8th Marquis of Niza and 8th Count of Unhão;
- Domingos Vasco Teles da Gama (1817–1873), 13th Count of Vidigueira, 9th Marquis of Niza and 9th Count of Unhão;
- Tomás Francisco Teles da Gama (1839–1903), 14th Count of Vidigueira;
- José Xavier Teles da Gama (1877–1941), 15th Count of Vidigueira, 10th Marquis of Nisa;
- Manuel Teles da Gama Soares Cardoso (1904–1963), 11th Marquis of Nisa;
- Maria Constança Teles da Gama Soares Cardoso (1926–2010), 16th Countess of Vidigueira, 12th Marchioness of Nisa and 10th Countess of Unhão.

== See also ==
- List of marquisates in Portugal
- List of countships in Portugal

== Bibliography ==
Nobreza de Portugal e do Brasil – Vol. III, pages 48/52 and 481/490. Published by Zairol Lda., Lisbon 1989.
