= St Helen's Basilica =

Basilica of St Helen
- The Basilica and Proto-Collegiate, Parish Church of St Helen
- Il-Knisja ta' Santa Liena; Il-Bażilika u Proto-Kolleġġjata Arċipretali ta' Sant' Elena
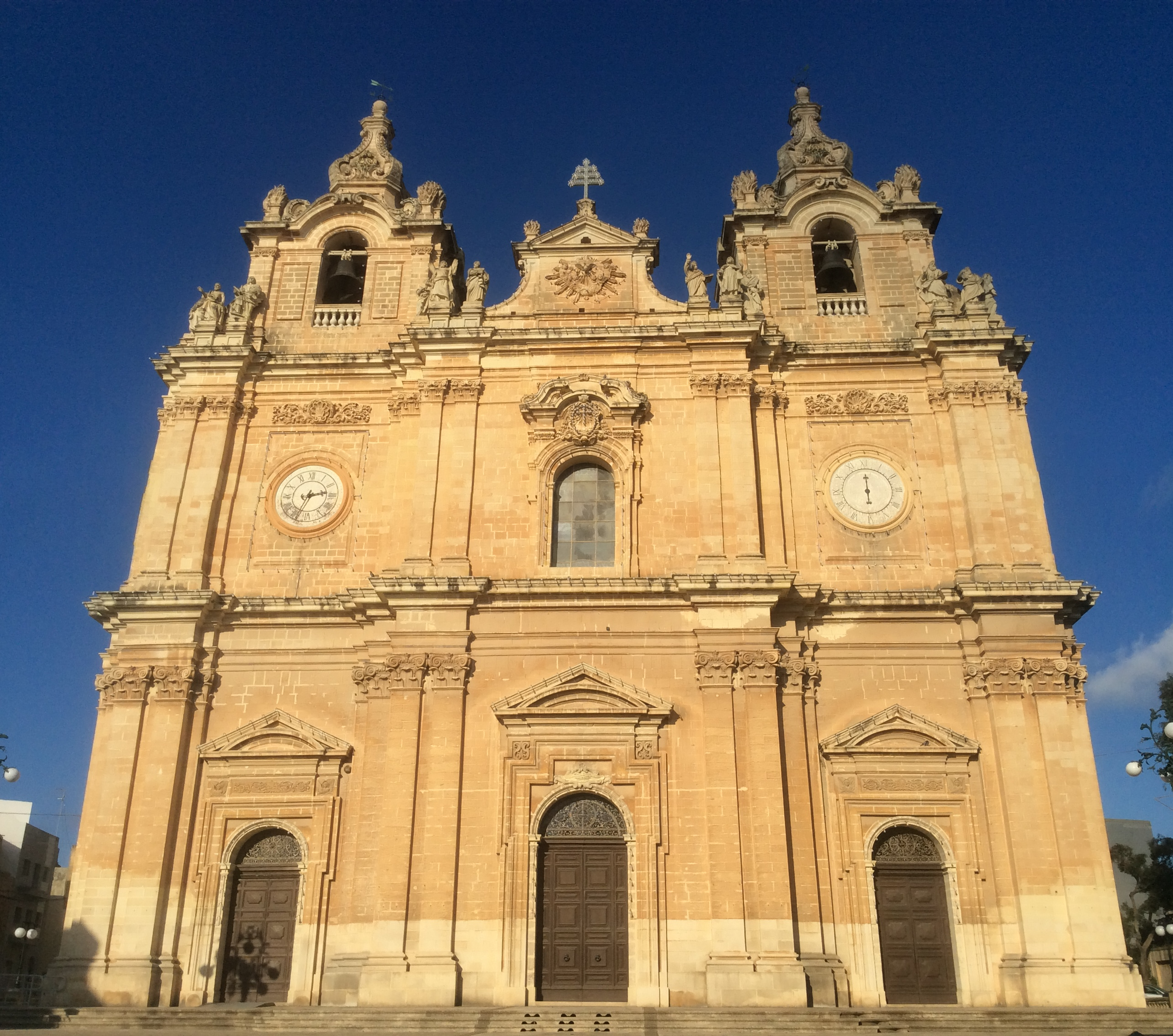
- Exterior of the Basilica
- Basilica of St Helen
- 35.9000°N 14.4653°E
- Location: Birkirkara
- Country: Malta
- Denomination: Roman Catholic
- Website: stelenamuseum.com

History
- Status: Collegiate Church, Minor Basilica, Parish Church
- Consecrated: 19 April 1745

Architecture
- Architect: Salvu Borg
- Architectural type: Church
- Style: Baroque

Clergy
- Dean: Anton Mallia Borg

St Helen's Basilica (Maltese: Il-Bażilika ta' Sant' Elena) is an 18th-century Roman Catholic church situated in Birkirkara, Malta. It is built on the baroque design by Salvu Borg and built by Mason Domenico Cachia. The design was inspired by, and is similar to, the Mdina Cathedral by Lorenzo Gafa. It was built to replace the role of the main old Parish Church of St. Mary (still parish church of the area) that was damaged in the 1856 earthquake. It eventually became the Collegiate Church and then a Minor Basilica. The current parish archpriest is Mons Louis Suban.

== History ==
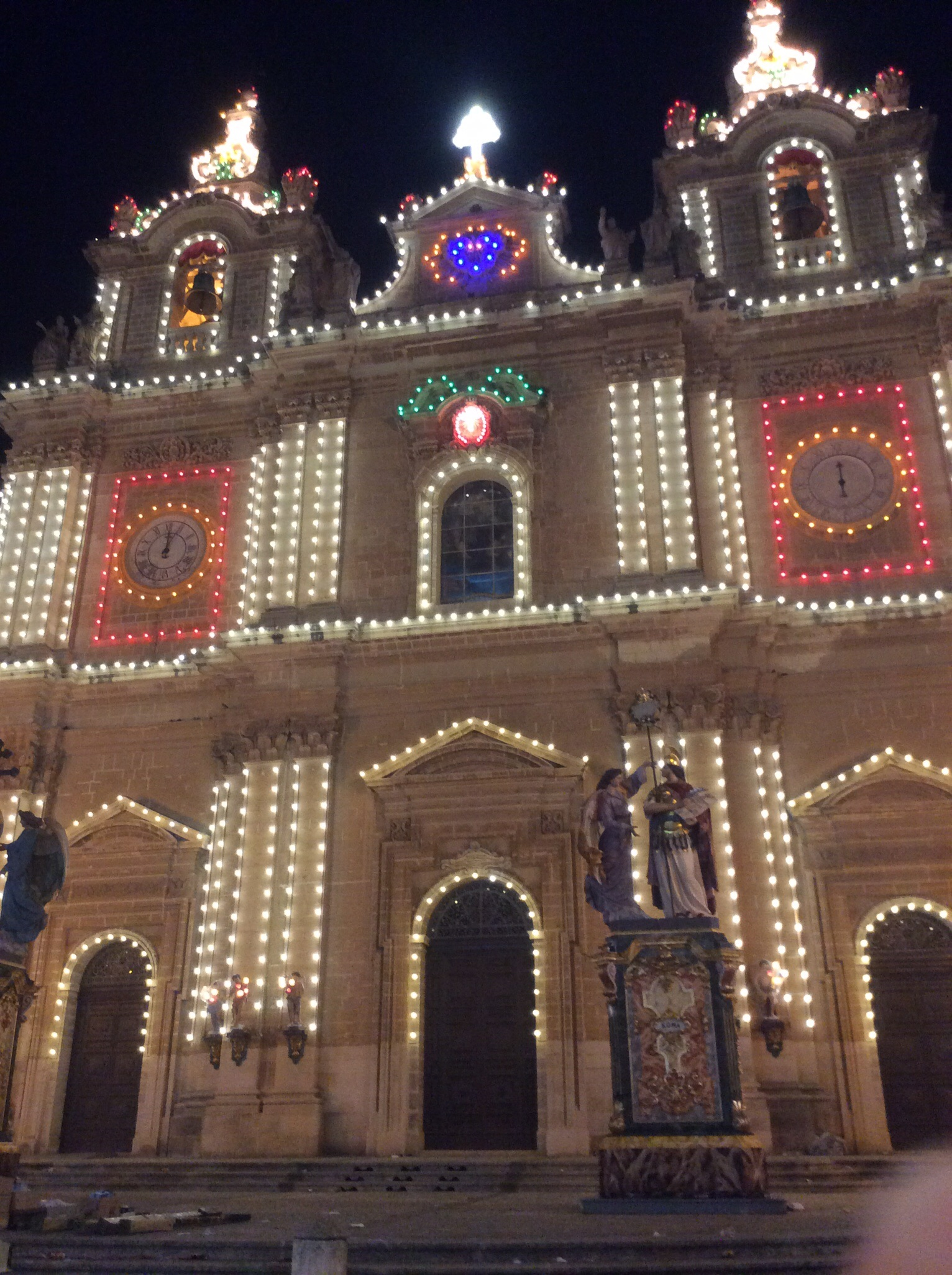
St Helen Basilica during feast week in 2015.

Birkirkara is one of the 12 Maltese parishes which existed in 1436 (close to the site of Ta' Ċieda Tower in modern San Ġwann), the year of the Rollo drawn up by the bishop of Malta, Senatore Mello.

The Ta' Xennu Church was built in 1575 and rebuilt in 1692 on the site of the present church that was dedicated to the Assumption. The 17th-century church was demolished to make way for the present St. Helen Church when the parish church was at the time the old Santa Maria Church. A small chapel dedicated to the assumption was included and built within the design of the St. Helen Church as a replacement of the 17th-century church. The St. Helen's Church became parish church soon after its completion and then a basilica. The large garden space of Vincenzo Borg's townhouse was donated by Brared to build the church's front, stairs and main square. When Vincenzo died he was buried in the church's crypt. The church was designed by Maltese Architect Salvu Borg (1662-1733).

The parish was dedicated to St Helen, and this was also the titular saint of the church built in the 18th century and still existing today. The church is also famous for housing Malta's largest church bell, installed around 1932.

On 5 December 1630 Pope Urban VIII established the collegiate chapter of church through the papal bull Sacri Apostolatus Ministerio. The present church was built in the centre of the Birkirkara on a much larger scale then the previous 3 churches that stood on the site. The cornerstone of the present church was laid on 27 April 1727 by Bishop Gaspare Gori-Mancini. A medal of St Helen and the names of the then Pope and bishop were also buried with the cornerstone. The church was blessed by Bishop Paul Alphéran de Bussan on 19 April 1771. The church was then consecrated by Bishop Vincenzo Labini on 20 October 1782. The church was elevated to the dignity of a Minor Basilica on 18 January 1950 by Pope Pius XII.

== See also ==
- Culture of Malta
- History of Malta
- List of Churches in Malta
- Religion in Malta
