= Corradino Batteries =

Series of artillery batteries in Malta

- Batteriji ta' Kordin
- Part of the French blockade batteries
- Paola, Malta
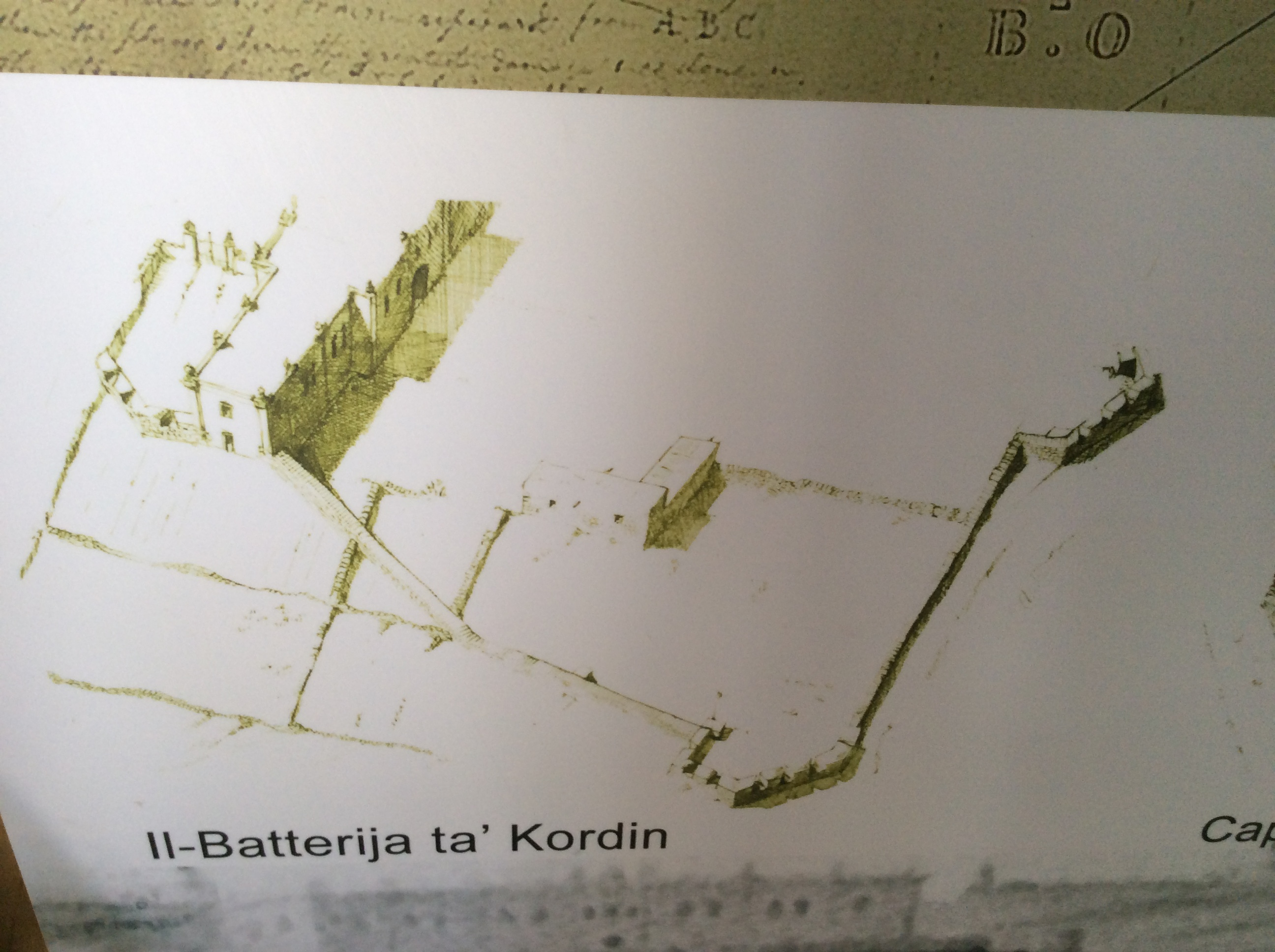
- Reconstruction of the Corradino Batteries by Stephen C. Spiteri at the Fortifications Interpretation Centre

Site information
- Type: Artillery batteries

Location
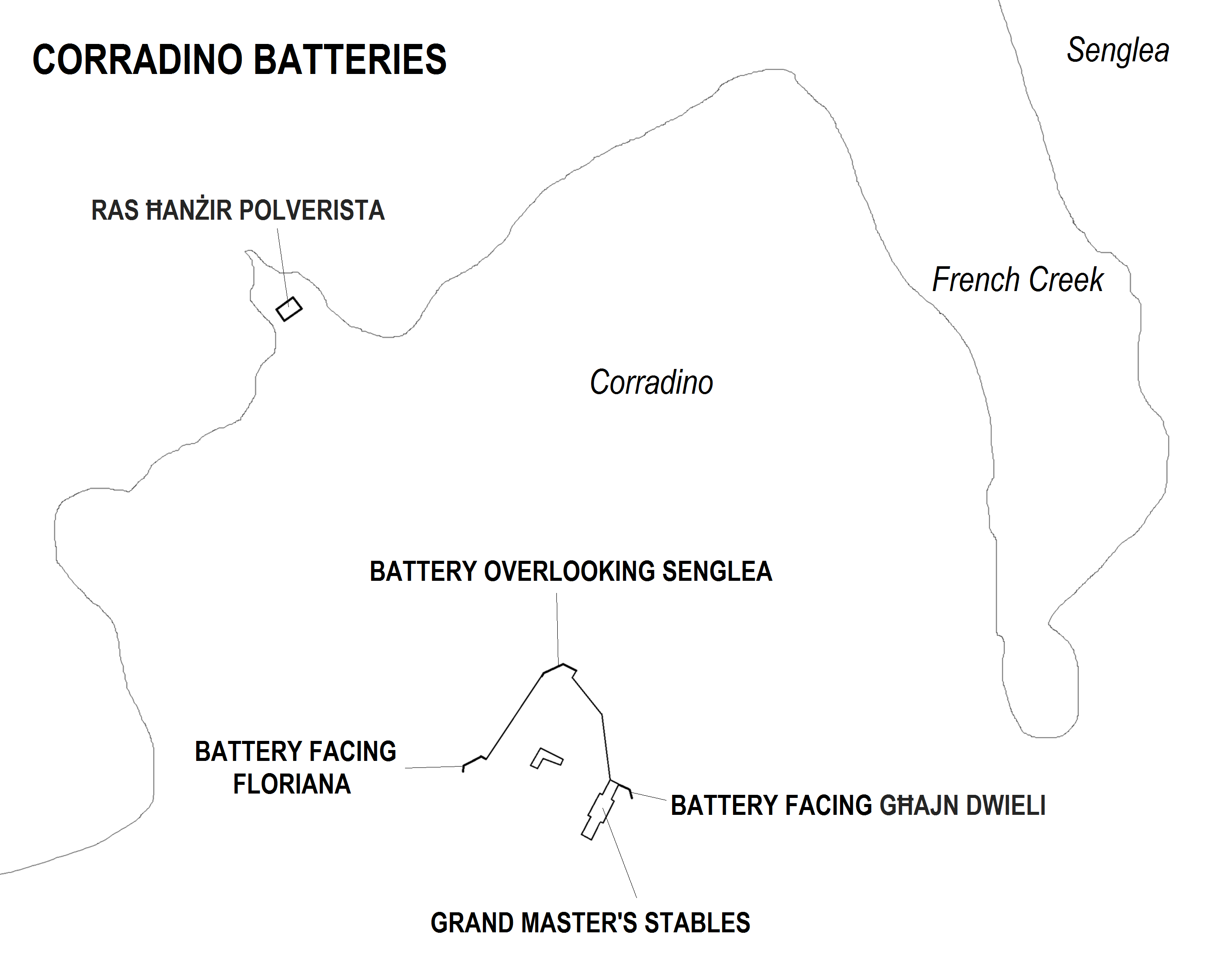
- Map of the Corradino Batteries
- Coordinates: 35°52′59.2″N 14°30′42.2″E

Site history
- Built: 1798–1799
- Built by: Maltese insurgents
- In use: 1798–1800
- Materials: Limestone
- Fate: Demolished, 1811
- Battles/wars: Siege of Malta (1798–1800)

Garrison information
- Past commanders: Emmanuele Vitale (overall commander)

The Corradino Batteries (Maltese: Batteriji ta' Kordin) were a series of artillery batteries on Corradino Heights, near Paola, Malta, that were built by Maltese insurgents during the French blockade of 1798–1800. The batteries formed part of a chain of batteries, redoubts and entrenchments encircling the French positions in Marsamxett and the Grand Harbour.

The Corradino Batteries were built on the grounds of the Grand Master's Stables, a large Baroque building on the summit of Corradino Heights. During the siege, the stables served as barracks for the insurgents. There were three batteries, overlooking Għajn Dwieli, Senglea and the Floriana Lines respectively:

- The battery facing Għajn Dwieli was located near the entrance of the stables, and it was armed with two 8-pounder guns.
- The battery facing the road coming from Senglea was armed with two 8-pounder cannon taken from the Xrobb l-Għaġin coastal entrenchment.
- The battery facing Marsa and the Floriana Lines was initially armed with four 6-pounder guns, but the British later added two 9-inch mortars.

The batteries were linked together with long rubble wall entrenchments. A Belvedere Tower was also located north of the batteries. By the end of the siege, the batteries were armed with five cannons, including an 18-pounder which had been taken from St. Julian's Battery. The architect Michele Cachia had a leading role in the construction of the batteries, which were completed in January 1799.

The batteries and adjoining camp was one of the largest and most important insurgent positions. The camp fell under the overall command of Emmanuele Vitale and was garrisoned by 224 men from Rabat and Dingli.

On 21 November 1798, French troops attacked Corradino, but were repelled by the Maltese. Throughout the siege, the guns of Valletta's Saluting Battery were trained on Corradino to counter the insurgents.

The Grand Master's Stables were extensively damaged by French bombardment, and the ruined structure was demolished by an order of 21 January 1811. The adjoining batteries were presumably also dismantled at this point. The area formerly occupied by the stables and battery is now heavily industrialized.
