= Siege of Malta (1798–1800) =

Battle during the War of the Second Coalition

- Part of the War of the Second Coalition
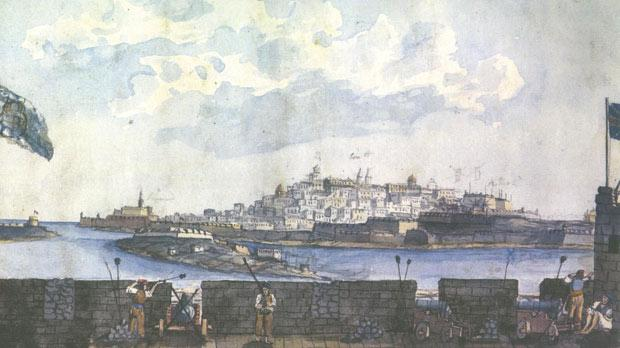
- Watercolour depicting French-occupied Valletta and Manoel Island as seen from Għargħar Battery, a rebel artillery position during the blockade
Date	2 September 1798 – 4 September 1800 (2 years, 2 days)
Location	Malta
Result	Allied victory
Territorial changes	Establishment of the Malta Protectorate

Belligerents
Maltese insurgents Great Britain; Portugal	France

Commanders and leaders
Emmanuele Vitale; Francesco Caruana; Vincenzo Borg; Horatio Nelson; Alexander Ball; Domingos Xavier of Nisa	Claude Vaubois (surrendered); Jean Perrée †; Pierre-Charles Villeneuve (surrendered)

Strength
Maltese: ~10,000; British: 16 ships Portuguese: 5 ships	6,000–7,000

Casualties and losses
Maltese: 300; British: light	4,000 surrendered 2,000 killed, wounded, sick or dead to disease
- 20,000 Maltese civilians dead to disease

The siege of Malta, also known as the siege of Valletta or the French blockade (Maltese: L-Imblokk tal-Franċiżi), was a two-year siege and blockade of the French garrison in Valletta and the Three Cities, the largest settlements and main port on the Mediterranean island of Malta, between 1798 and 1800. Malta had been captured by a French expeditionary force during the Mediterranean campaign of 1798, and garrisoned with 3,000 soldiers under the command of Claude-Henri Belgrand de Vaubois. After the British Royal Navy destroyed the French Mediterranean Fleet at the Battle of the Nile on 1 August 1798, the British with the cooperation of a Portuguese naval squadron were able to initiate a blockade of Malta, assisted by an uprising among the native Maltese population against French rule. After its retreat to Valletta, the French garrison faced severe food shortages, exacerbated by the effectiveness of the British blockade. Although small quantities of supplies arrived in early 1799, there was no further traffic until early 1800, by which time starvation and disease were having a disastrous effect on the health, morale, and combat capability of the French troops.

In February 1800, a significant convoy under Contre-Admiral Jean-Baptiste Perrée sent from Toulon made a determined effort to resupply the garrison. The blockade squadron under Rear-Admiral Lord Nelson intercepted the convoy within sight of the starving troops on Malta. Perrée was killed and his flagship captured in the ensuing and brief Battle of the Malta Convoy; no supplies reached Malta. The following month, the ship of the line Guillaume Tell set sail from Valletta to Toulon, laden with soldiers, but this too was intercepted and in a hard-fought battle was forced to surrender to a larger British squadron. These defeats rendered the French position on Valletta untenable, and its surrender inevitable. Although Vaubois held out for another five months, he eventually surrendered on 4 September and Malta was taken by Britain.

== Background ==
=== French invasion of Malta ===
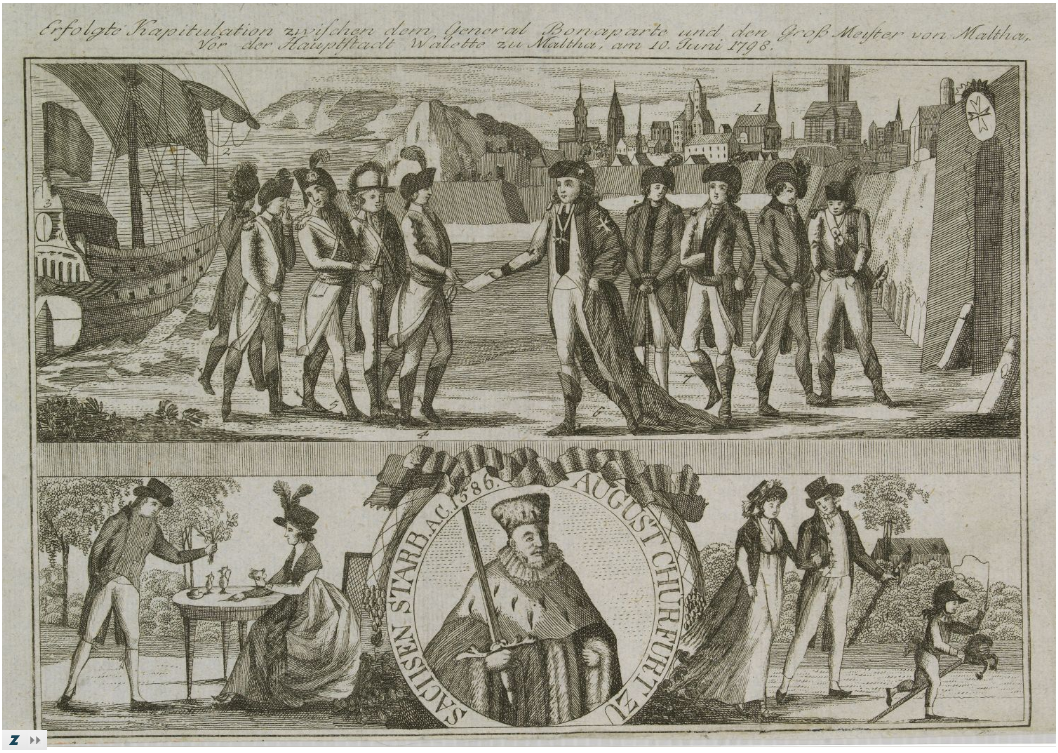
Capitulation of Malta to general Bonaparte

On 19 May 1798, a French fleet sailed from Toulon, escorting an expeditionary force of over 30,000 men under General Napoleon Bonaparte. The force was destined for Egypt, Bonaparte seeking to expand French influence in Asia and force Britain to make peace in the French Revolutionary Wars, which had begun in 1792. Sailing southeast, the convoy collected additional transports from Italian ports and at 05:30 on 9 June arrived off Valletta, the heavily fortified port-city on the island of Malta. At this time, Malta and its neighbouring islands were ruled by the Knights of St. John, an old and influential feudal order weakened by the loss of most of their revenue during the French Revolution. The order was composed of men from across Europe, including a significant proportion of Frenchmen, who ruled over the majority Maltese population of the islands. The head of government was Grand Master Ferdinand von Hompesch zu Bolheim, who refused Bonaparte's demand that his entire convoy be allowed to enter Valletta and take on supplies, insisting that Malta's neutrality meant that only two ships could enter at a time.

On receiving this reply, Bonaparte immediately ordered his fleet to bombard Valletta and on 11 June General Louis Baraguey d'Hilliers directed an amphibious operation in which several thousand soldiers landed at seven strategic sites around the island. The French Knights deserted the order, and the remaining Knights failed to mount a meaningful resistance. Approximately 2,000 native Maltese militia resisted for 24 hours, retreating to Valletta once the city of Mdina fell to General Claude-Henri Belgrand de Vaubois. Although Valletta was strong enough to hold out against a lengthy siege, Bonaparte negotiated a surrender with Hompesch, who agreed to turn Malta and all of its resources over to the French in exchange for estates and pensions in France for himself and his knights. Bonaparte then established a French garrison on the islands, leaving 4,000 men under Vaubois while he and the rest of the expeditionary force sailed eastwards for Alexandria on 19 June.

=== Battle of the Nile ===
Bonaparte's convoy was pursued across the Mediterranean by a British fleet of 14 ships under Rear-Admiral Sir Horatio Nelson, who learned of the invasion of Malta while anchored off Sicily, and subsequently attempted to intercept the French on their passage to Egypt. Nelson's force overtook the French fleet on the night of 22 June in the dark without discovering their presence, and arrived off Alexandria on 28 June ahead of Bonaparte. Believing that the French must have had a different objective, Nelson turned northwards the following day to investigate the coast of Anatolia and missed Bonaparte's arrival on 30 June by less than 24 hours. Unopposed, Bonaparte landed his army and marched on Alexandria, capturing the city and turning inland. The fleet was ordered to anchor in nearby Aboukir Bay and await further instructions. On 1 August, Nelson returned to the Egyptian coast and discovered the French fleet at anchor. Attacking immediately, Nelson's ships managed to capture nine French ships of the line and destroy two, including the flagship Orient with only moderate damage to themselves. The destruction of the French Mediterranean fleet granted control of the sea to the Royal Navy, soon joined by the navies of Portugal, Naples, the Russian Empire and the Ottoman Empire as part of the hastily organised Second Coalition against France.

== Siege ==
=== Maltese uprising ===
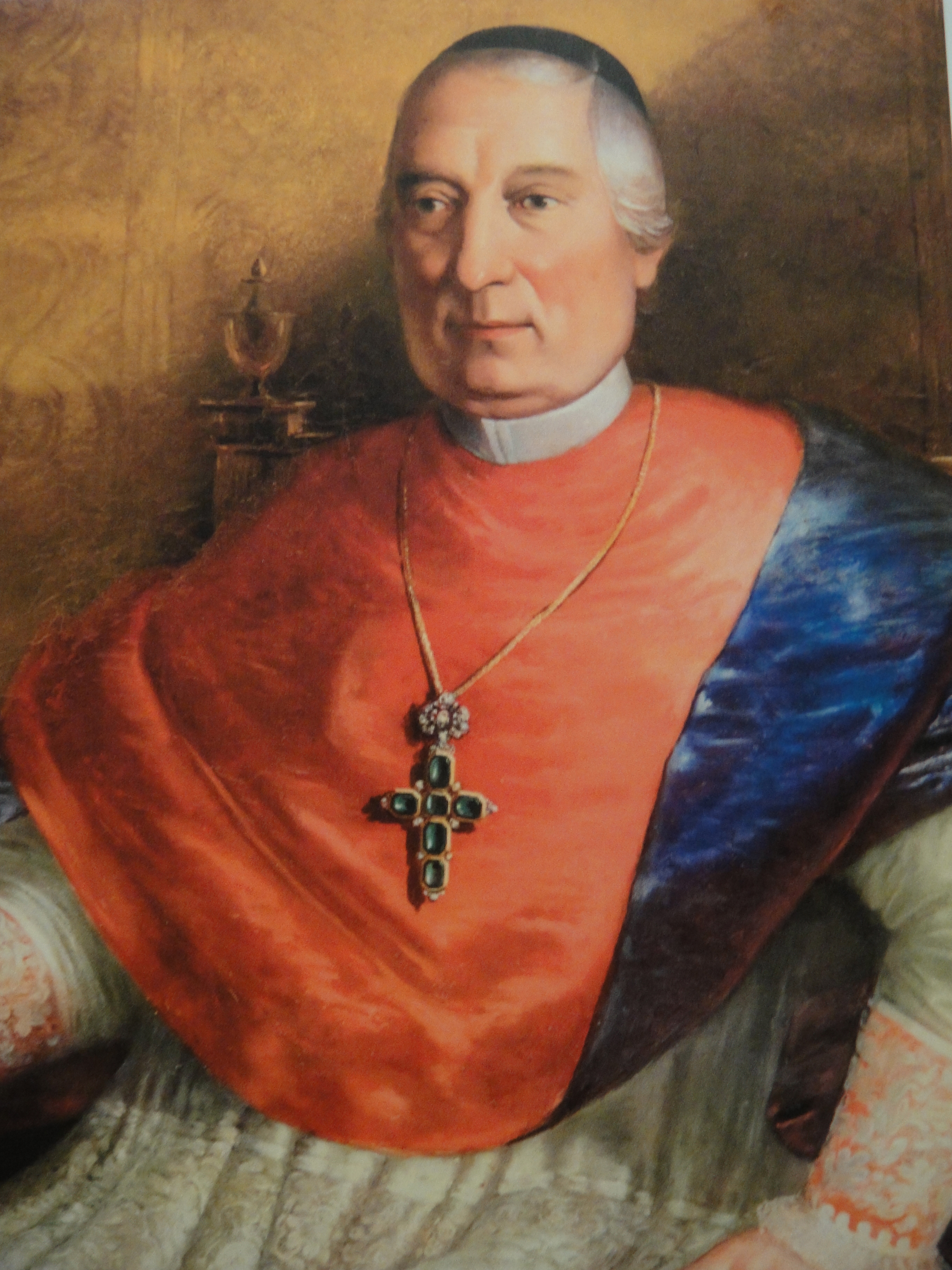
Canon Francesco Saverio Caruana, one of the Maltese insurgent leaders. He later became Bishop of Malta.

On Malta, the French had rapidly dismantled the institutions of the Knights of St. John, including the Roman Catholic Church. Church property was looted and seized to pay for the expedition to Egypt, an act that generated considerable anger among the deeply religious Maltese population. On 2 September 1798, this anger erupted in a popular uprising during an auction of church property, and within days thousands of Maltese irregulars had driven the French garrison into Valletta. Valletta was surrounded by approximately 10,000 irregular Maltese soldiers led by Emmanuele Vitale and Canon Francesco Saverio Caruana. The Maltese were armed with 23 cannon and a small squadron of coastal gunboats. Although there was intermittent skirmishing between the garrison and the Maltese, the fortress was too strong for the irregulars to assault.

In mid-September, a squadron of Portuguese ships had arrived at the island. They included the Príncipe Real (90 cannons; Captain Puysigur), Rainha de Portugal (74; Captain Thomas Stone), São Sebastião (74; Captain Mitchell), Afonso de Albuquerque (74; Captain Donald Campbell), and the brig Falcão (24; Captain Duncan). All were under the command of Domingos Xavier de Lima, Marquess of Niza. In addition, the British ship HMS Lion (Captain Manley Dixon) and the fireship HMS Incendiary (Captain George Baker) were attached to the squadron. The Portuguese government had sent this force from the Tagus to augment Nelson's fleet. After a brief stay off Malta the squadron continued to Alexandria. There Nelson sent the squadron back to blockade Malta.

Late in September, a British convoy consisting of 13 battered ships under Captain Sir James Saumarez appeared off the island. Survivors of the Battle of the Nile, they were in urgent need of repair and unable to directly assist in the siege. Nevertheless, Saumarez met with representatives of the Maltese and on 25 September, sent an offer of truce to Vaubois on their behalf. Vaubois replied "Vous avez, sans doute, oublié que des Français sont dans la place. Le sort des habitans [sic] ne vous regarde pointe. Quant à votre sommation, les soldats français ne sont point habitués à ce style" ("You have, no doubt, forgotten that French soldiers are present. The fate of the inhabitants is none of your concern. As for your summons, French soldiers are not accustomed to that style). Unable to persuade the French to give in, Saumarez instead provided the Maltese forces with 1,200 muskets with which to continue the siege and, unable to delay repairs any longer, sailed for Gibraltar at the end of the month.

On 12 October, the British ships of the line HMS Alexander under Captain Alexander Ball, HMS Culloden under Captain Thomas Troubridge and HMS Colossus under Captain George Murray joined Niza's ships off Malta, marking the formal start of the blockade. On the same day, Vaubois withdrew the last of his soldiers into the fortified new city of Valletta, accompanied by approximately 100 Maltese nationals who had joined the French forces. The garrison numbered over 3,000 men and initially at least was well supplied. In the harbour lay the ships of the line Dégo and Athénien and the frigate Carthaginoise, all of which were former ships of the Maltese Navy, as well as the newly arrived Guillaume Tell and frigates Justice and Diane, survivors of the Battle of the Nile under Rear-Admiral Pierre-Charles Villeneuve, which had reached Malta at the end of September.

=== Capture of Gozo ===
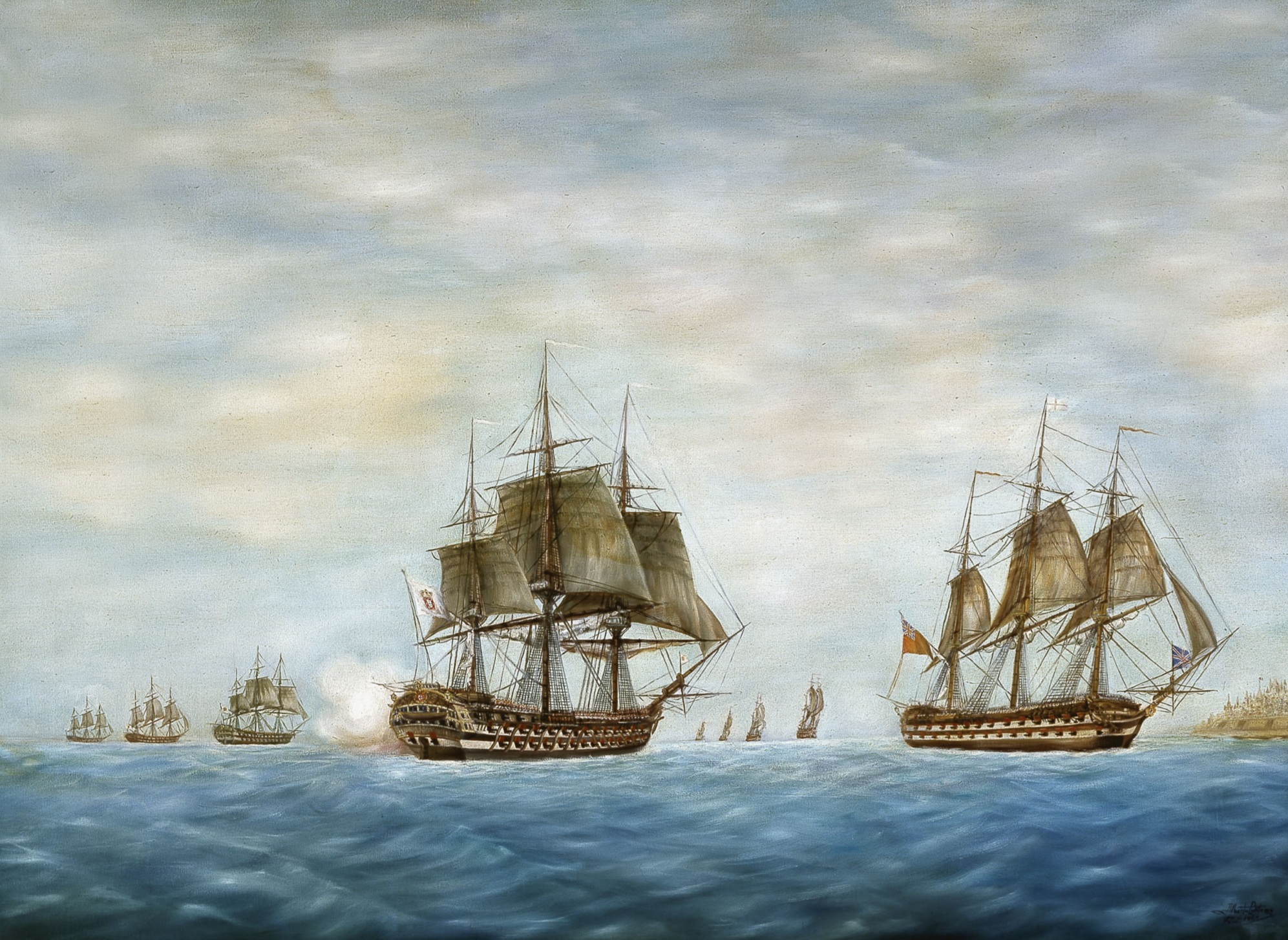
The Portuguese ship Rainha de Portugal saluting Alexander Ball's squadron on October 1798

On 24 October, after a ten-day passage from Naples, Nelson joined the blockade squadron in HMS Vanguard accompanied by HMS Minotaur. On 28 October, Ball successfully completed negotiations with the French garrison on the small island of Gozo, the 217 French soldiers there agreeing to surrender without a fight and transferring the island, its fortifications, 24 cannon, a large quantity of ammunition and 3,200 sacks of flour to the British. Although the island was formally claimed by King Ferdinand of Naples, it was administered by British and Maltese representatives, whose first action was to distribute the captured food supplies to the island's 16,000 inhabitants.

Malta and the surrounding islands were not self-sufficient and quickly the challenge of feeding the population became a strain on the islands' resources, particularly with so many men under arms. Although now formally in command of the islands, King Ferdinand refused to assist with supplies, and the responsibility was left to Ball and his captains to arrange for the transport of supplies from Italy. By the end of the year, the number of Maltese troops in the field had fallen from 10,000 to 1,500, supported by 500 British and Portuguese marines from the blockade squadron. The blockade fleet, consisting of five British and four Portuguese ships, operated from St. Paul's Bay and Marsa Sirocco (now Marsaxlokk) on the island of Malta itself.

=== Blockade ===
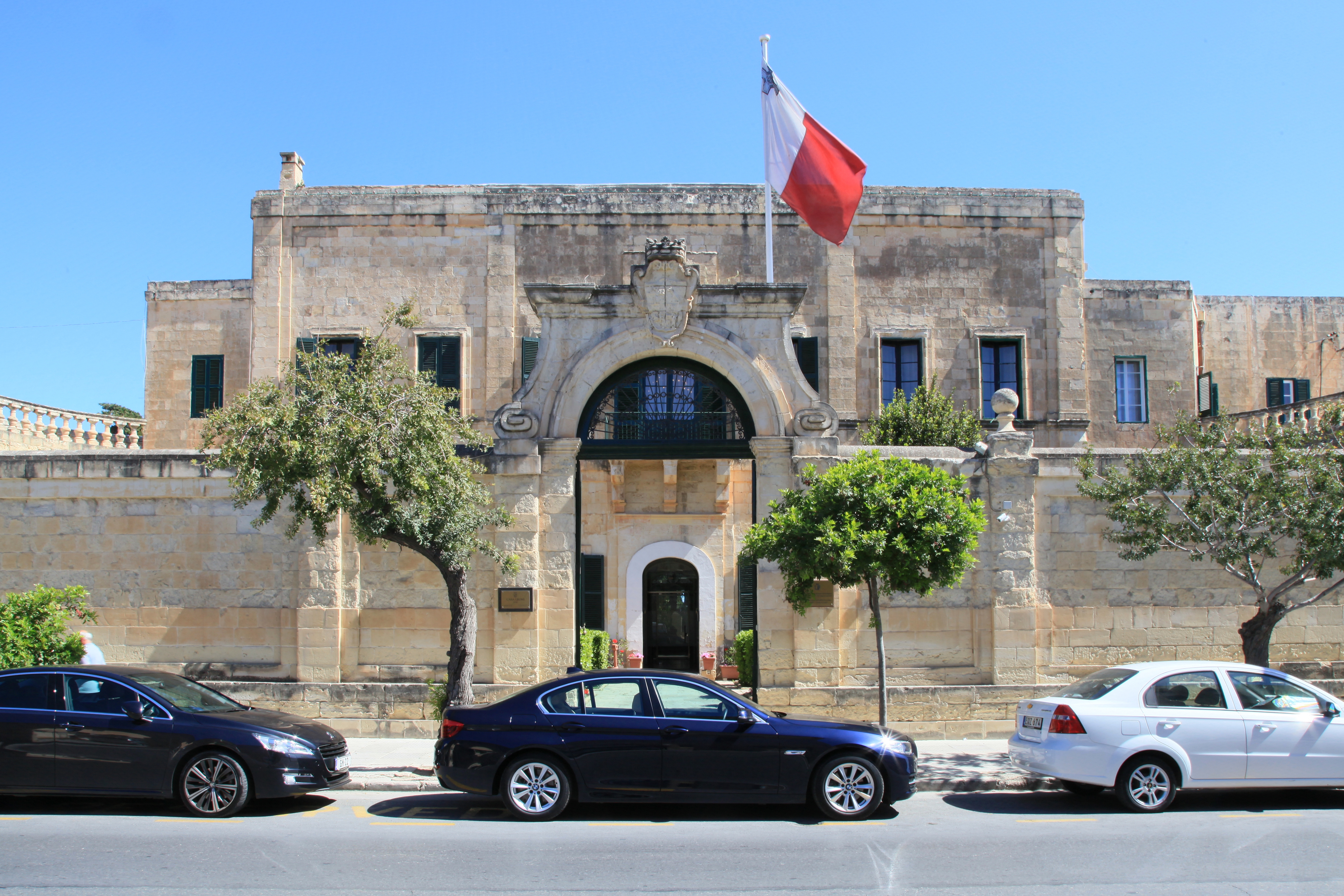
Casa Leoni, the command base for the Maltese insurgents

1799 was a frustrating year for the British and Maltese forces deployed against the French forces, as efforts to secure sufficient forces to prosecute the siege were repeatedly denied. Major-General James St Clair-Erskine, commander of British Army forces in the Mediterranean, considered the ongoing War of the Second Coalition in Italy and the defence of Menorca to be higher priorities than Ball's siege, while the defeated Neapolitans continued to refuse assistance. A Russian squadron under Admiral Fyodor Fyodorovich Ushakov briefly appeared off the island in January, but was almost immediately ordered to join the Russian and Turkish forces besieging the island of Corfu. In addition to the difficulties the Allies faced in obtaining food for the Maltese population, the French succeeded in bringing supplies through the blockade in the early part of the year: in January 1799 a schooner reached Valletta from Ancona, and in February the frigate Boudeuse evaded the blockade and entered the port with supplies from Toulon. In May, a major French expedition under Admiral Etienne Eustache Bruix entered the Western Mediterranean, forcing Nelson to recall his scattered fleet from across the region, temporarily raising the blockade of Malta. During this operation a number of French supply ships took advantage of the absence of the British squadron to enter Valletta.

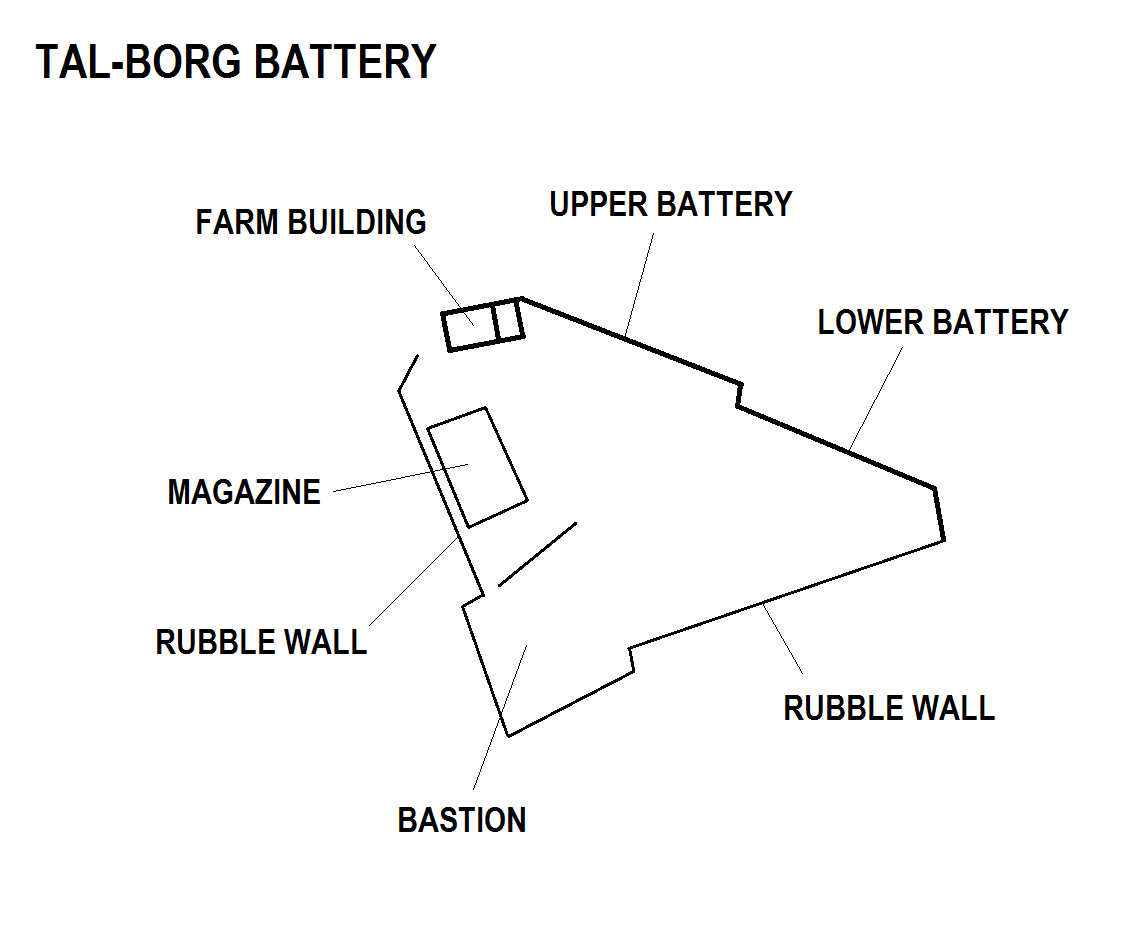
Map of Tal-Borg Battery, one of the batteries built by the Maltese to bombard French positions and repel any counterattack

However, despite these occasional supply ships, the French garrison was rapidly running out of food. To conserve resources, the French forced the civilian population out of the city; the civilian population dropped from 45,000 in 1799 to 9,000 by 1800. Nelson himself took nominal command of the blockade, while Ball was made president of the Maltese National Congress. As liaison between the Maltese military and civilian commanders, he directed the distribution of supplies to the Maltese population, which was beginning to suffer from disease brought about by food shortages. He was replaced on Alexander by his first lieutenant, William Harrington. On 1 November Nelson again offered terms of surrender to Vaubois, and was again rebuffed, with the reply "Jaloux de mériter l'estime de votre nation, comme vous recherchez celle de la nôtre, nous sommes résolus défendre cette fortresse jusqu'à l'extrémité" ("Eager to earn the esteem of your nation, as you seek that of ours, we are resolved to defend this fortress to the bitter end"). By this point, Nelson was conducting the blockade at a distance, based at the Neapolitan court in Palermo. There he indulged in gambling and social engagements, becoming closer and closer to Emma, Lady Hamilton, wife of the ambassador Sir William Hamilton. His behaviour was heavily criticised, not just by his commanding officer Vice-Admiral Lord Keith, who had recently replaced Earl St Vincent, but also by old friends such as Thomas Troubridge, who wrote to him "If you knew what your friends feel for you I am sure you would cut out all the nocturnal parties . . . I beseech your Lordship, leave off". In December 1799, Erskine was replaced by Lieutenant-General Henry Edward Fox, who immediately redistributed 800 troops from the garrison at Messina to Malta under Brigadier-General Thomas Graham. These troops filled the gap left by the withdrawal of Portuguese forces, which had been ordered to return to Lisbon. Disease began to spread within the city as rations became scarcer. The arrival of an aviso in January 1800 with the news of the events of 18 Brumaire that made Bonaparte First Consul of France prompted a brief respite and a public statement from Vaubois that the city would never be surrendered, although conditions continued to deteriorate.

=== Convoy battles ===
At the beginning of February 1800, the Neapolitan government, reinstated in Naples after being expelled the year before, finally agreed to participate in the siege and 1,200 troops were embarked on a squadron led by Vice-Admiral Lord Keith's flagship HMS Queen Charlotte and landed on Malta. For a time, both Keith and Nelson remained with the blockade squadron, which consisted of six ships of the line, along with a few Neapolitan ships of the line, and several British and Neapolitan frigates. On 17 February a message arrived with the squadron from the frigate HMS Success, which had been stationed off Sicily to watch for French reinforcements. Captain Shuldham Peard reported that he was shadowing a squadron of six or seven French ships sailing in the direction of Malta. These vessels were a relief squadron, sent from Toulon with extensive food supplies and 3,000 additional troops under Contre-Admiral Jean-Baptiste Perrée in Généreux, one of the ships of the line that had escaped at the Nile two years earlier. On 18 February, the convoy was sighted by lookouts on Alexander. In the ensuing chase, Success captured a French transport and attacked the much larger Généreux. Although the frigate was damaged in the exchange, Success' second broadside mortally wounded Perrée and delayed the ship of the line long enough for HMS Foudroyant, under Lord Nelson, and HMS Northumberland to join the battle. Heavily outnumbered, Généreux surrendered.

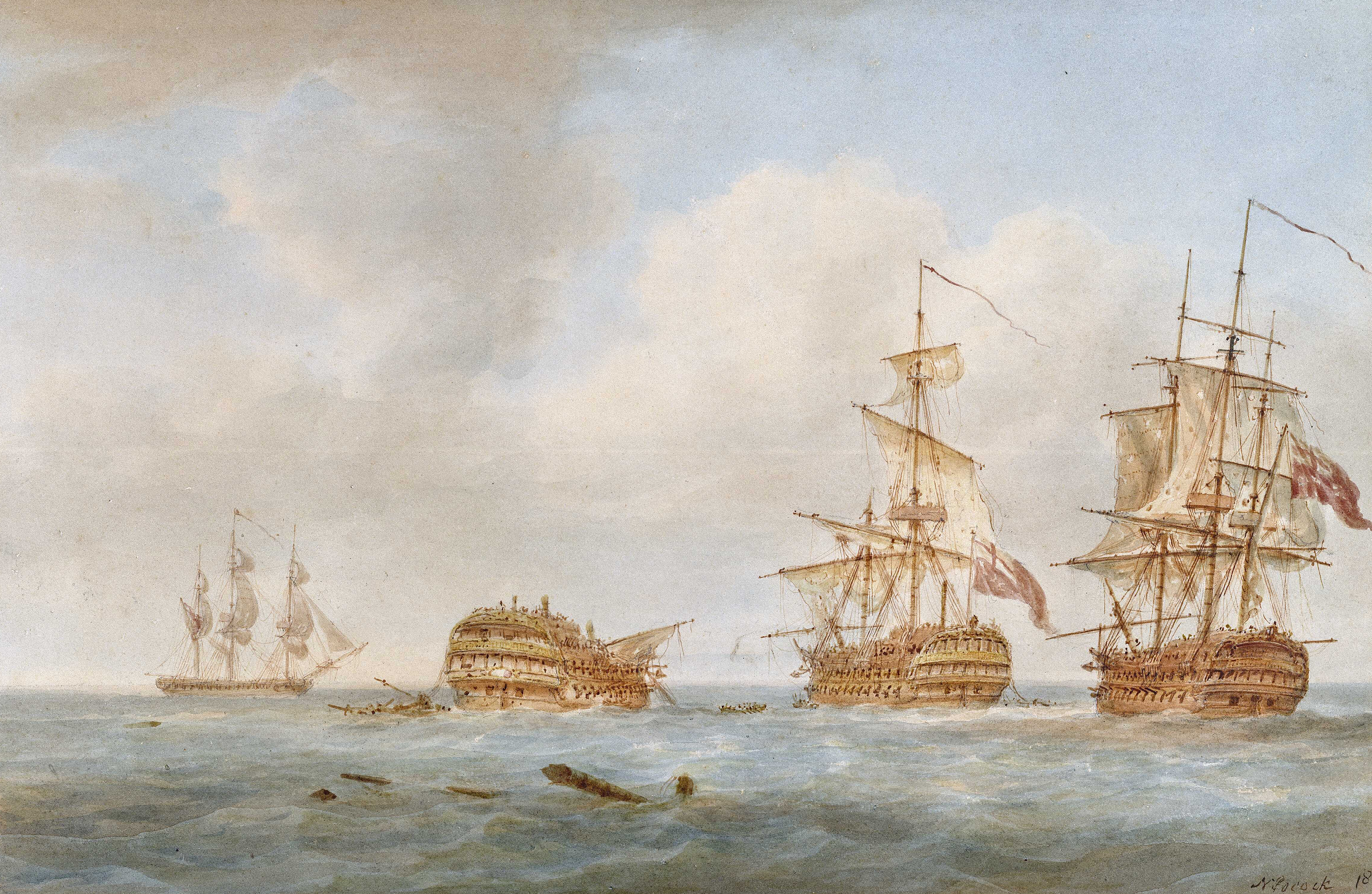
Capture of Guillaume Tell

Shortly after the capture of the Généreux, Keith returned to the Italian coast in Queen Charlotte, where his flagship was lost in a fire that killed more than 700 of its crew, although Keith was ashore at the time. Before departing, Keith issued strict instructions to Nelson that he was not to return to Palermo, but was to confine any shore leave in Sicily to Syracuse. Nelson ignored the order and by late March was in Palermo conducting an open love affair with Emma Hamilton. In his absence, Troubridge took over command of the blockade, delegating temporarily to Captain Manley Dixon. Dixon led the squadron on 31 March when Guillaume Tell attempted to break out on Valletta under Decrés. Spotted by the frigate HMS Penelope under Captain Henry Blackwood, Guillaume Tell was chased northwards and engaged by first Penelope and then by Dixon's HMS Lion, driving both ships back but suffering severe damage. Eventually the arrival of the powerful Foudroyant under Captain Sir Edward Berry proved too much for Decrés, but he continued fighting for another two hours before he was forced to surrender his battered and dismasted ship; in the engagement, he lost more than 200 men killed and wounded.

=== Nelson's cruise ===
In the aftermath of these French defeats at sea, and with the food supply in Valletta dwindling, the British sent another demand for capitulation. Vaubois again refused, with the reply "Cette place est en trop bon état, et je suis moi-même trop jaloux de bien servir mon pays et de conserver mon honneur, pour écouter vos propositions." ("This place is in too good a condition, and I myself am too jealous of serving my country well and preserving my honour, to listen to your proposals"). In reality, the situation was dire: during February, prices of basic foodstuffs stood at 16 francs for a fowl, 12 francs for a rabbit, 20 sous for an egg, 18 sous for a lettuce, 40 sous for a rat and six francs per pound for fish. For the civilian typhus patients, the only food available was horse-flesh soup.

On 23 April, Nelson departed Palermo in Foudroyant, with both Sir William and Emma Hamilton on board as his guests. The party visited Syracuse and then travelled on to Valletta, where Berry took Foudroyant so close to the harbour that the ship came under fire from the French batteries. It was not hit, but Nelson was furious that Emma had been taken into danger and immediately ordered Berry to withdraw. His anger was exacerbated by Emma's refusal to retire from the quarterdeck during the brief exchange. From there, Foudroyant anchored at Marsa Sirocco, where Nelson and Emma lived together openly and were hosted by Troubridge and Graham. Sir William Hamilton, a prominent antiquarian as well as a diplomat, spent his time exploring the island. By early June, Nelson and his party had returned to Palermo, the beginning of a lengthy overland journey across Europe to Britain. Nelson also detached Foudroyant and Alexander from the blockade, again in defiance of Keith's explicit orders, to assist the Neapolitan royal family in their passage to Livorno. Enraged at Nelson's disobedience, Keith publicly remarked that "Lady Hamilton has had command of the fleet long enough". In May, Troubridge returned to Britain and was replaced in command by Captain George Martin, while Graham was succeeded by Major-General Henry Pigot.

=== Surrender ===
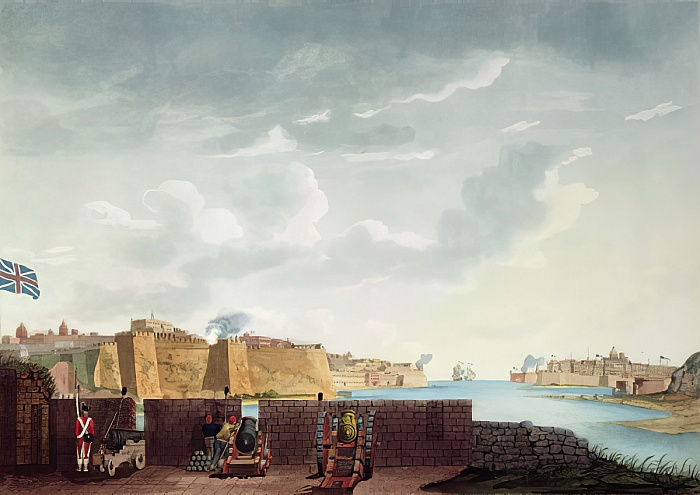
View of La Valletta during the siege engraved by Francis Chesham - showing British siege positions from Marsa Battery

The British blockade continued to prevent French efforts to resupply Valletta during the early summer of 1800, and by August the situation was desperate: no horses or pack animals, dogs, cats, fowls or rabbits still lived within the city, the cisterns had been emptied and even firewood was in short supply. So desperate was the need for wood that the frigate Boudeuse, trapped by the blockade, was broken up for fuel by the beleaguered garrison. With defeat now inevitable, Vaubois gave orders that the frigates Diane and Justice were to attempt a breakout for Toulon, with minimal crews of approximately 115 men each. On 24 August, when the wind was favourable and the night dark enough to obscure their movements, the frigates put to sea. Almost immediately, lookouts on HMS Success sighted them and Captain Peard gave chase, followed by HMS Genereux and Northumberland. Diane under Captain Solen was too slow and Peard soon overhauled the under-strength French ship, which surrendered after a brief exchange of shot. The frigate later became HMS Niobe. Justice, under Captain Jean Villeneuve, was faster, however, and outran its pursuers, eventually making Toulon, the only ship from Malta to do so during the siege.

On 3 September, with his men dying of starvation and disease at the rate of more than 100 a day, Vaubois called a council of his officers at which they unanimously decided to surrender. The next day, envoys were sent to the British and in the afternoon General Pigot and Captain Martin signed the agreed terms with Vaubois and Villeneuve. The Maltese were excluded from negotiations entirely, although their commander, Alexander Ball, subsequently became the first Civil Commissioner of Malta.

== Aftermath ==
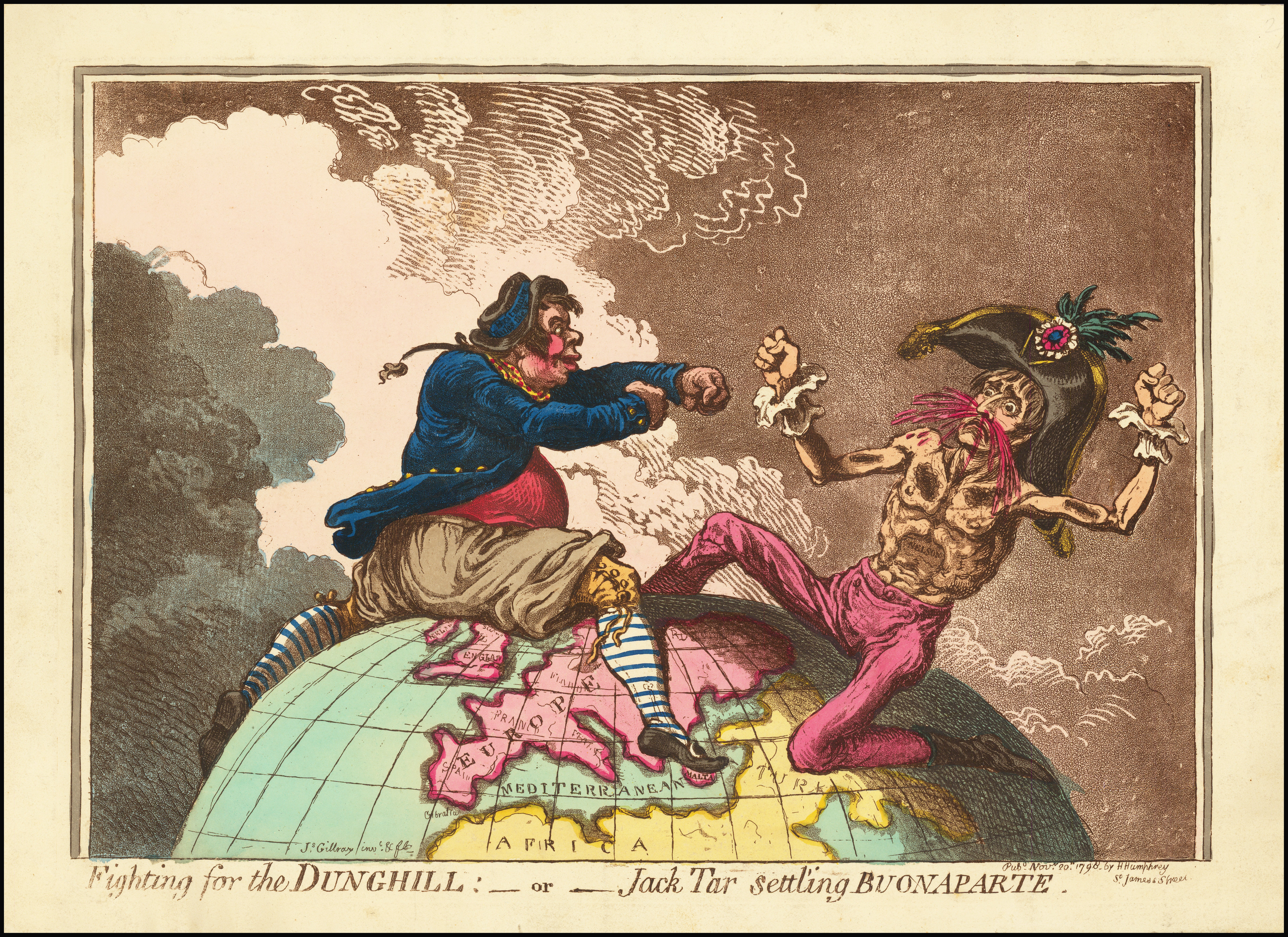
Fighting for the Dunghill, a cartoon by James Gillray depicting Jack Tar giving Napoleon a bloody nose.

The terms of the surrender were absolute: the island, its dependencies, fortifications and military supplies were all turned over to British control. This included the ships of the line Athenien and Dégo and the frigate Carthagénaise (these were all French ships previously captured from the Order), although only Athenien was of sufficient standard to be incorporated into the Royal Navy, becoming HMS Athenienne. The other ships were broken up in their berths. The British also took two merchant ships and a variety of smaller warships. The capture of Malta gave control of the central Mediterranean to Britain and was an important step in the invasion and liberation of Egypt from French rule in 1801.

An essential condition of the Treaty of Amiens in the same year, which brought an end to the French Revolutionary War, was that the British leave Malta. The Napoleonic Wars with the French Empire began soon afterwards, in part due to the unwillingness of the United Kingdom to comply with this clause of the treaty. The Russian Tsar Alexander I had a long-standing claim to the island as titular head of the Knights of St. John, and demanded that it be turned over to Russian control before agreeing to any alliance with Britain. Prime Minister William Pitt the Younger flatly refused, and the Russians backed down, agreeing to an anti-French alliance. The island remained in British hands until its independence in 1964.

== Bibliography ==
- Adkins, Roy & Lesley (2006). The War for All the Oceans. Abacus. ISBN 0-349-11916-3.
- Bradford, Ernle (1999) [1977]. Nelson: The Essential Hero. Wordsworth Military Library. ISBN 1-84022-202-6.
- Castillo, Dennis Angelo (2006). The Maltese Cross: A Strategic History of Malta Issue 229 of Contributions in military studies. Greenwood Publishing Group. ISBN 978-0-313-32329-4.
- Clowes, William Laird (1997) [1900]. The Royal Navy, A History from the Earliest Times to 1900, Volume IV. Chatham Publishing. ISBN 1-86176-013-2.
- Cole, Juan (2007). Napoleon's Egypt; Invading the Middle East. Palgrave Macmillan. ISBN 978-1-4039-6431-1.
- Gardiner, Robert, ed. (2001) [1996]. Nelson Against Napoleon. Caxton Editions. ISBN 1-86176-026-4.
- Grocott, Terence (2002) [1997]. Shipwrecks of the Revolutionary & Napoleonic Era. Caxton Editions. ISBN 1-84067-164-5.
- James, William (2002) [1827]. The Naval History of Great Britain, Volume 2, 1797–1799. Conway Maritime Press. ISBN 0-85177-906-9.
- James, William (2002) [1827]. The Naval History of Great Britain, Volume 3, 1800–1805. Conway Maritime Press. ISBN 0-85177-907-7.
- Mostert, Noel (2007). The Line upon a Wind: The Greatest War Fought at Sea Under Sail 1793–1815. Vintage Books. ISBN 978-0-7126-0927-2.
- Woodman, Richard (2001). The Sea Warriors. Constable Publishers. ISBN 1-84119-183-3.
