= Selmun Palace =

- Il-Palazz ta' Selmun
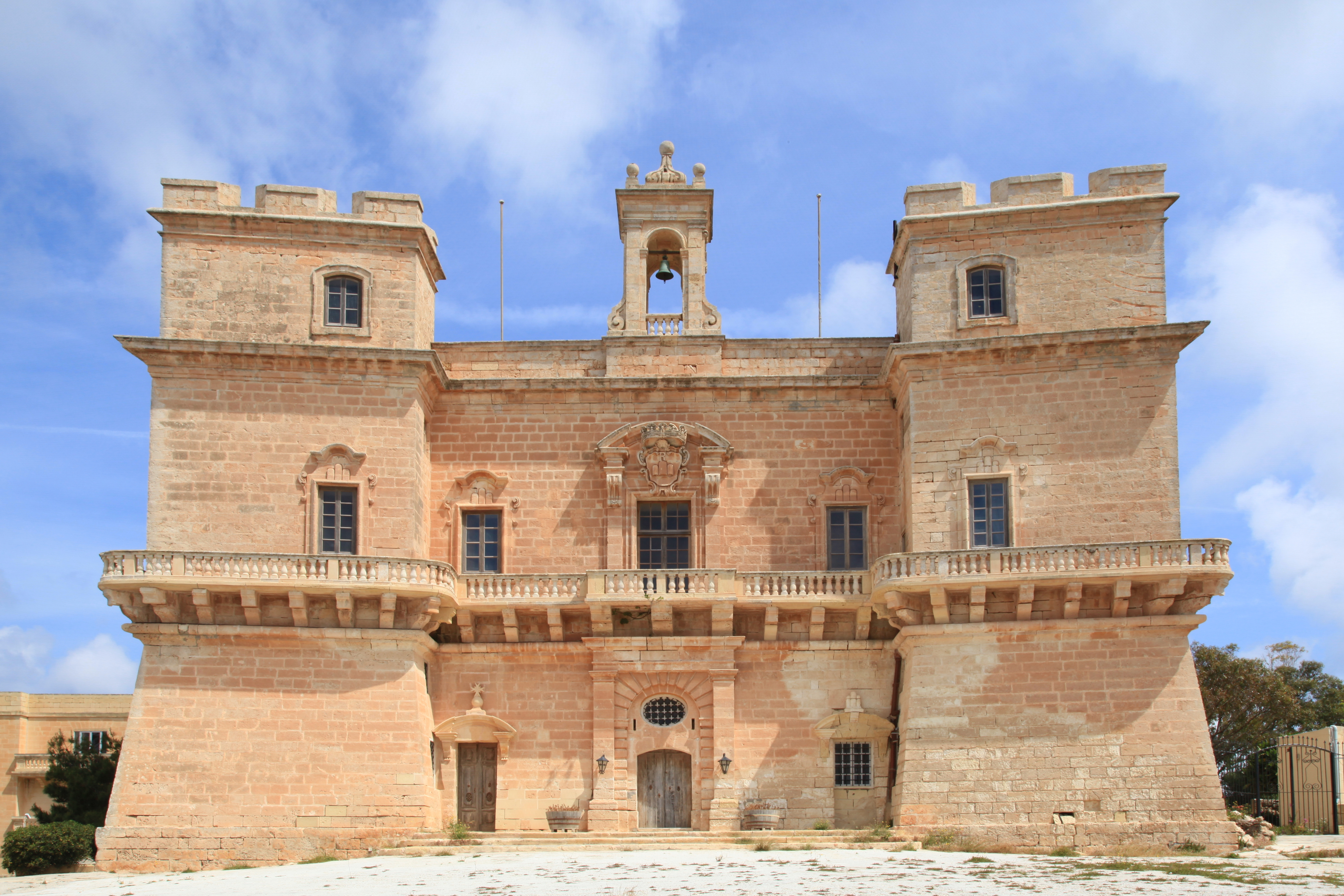
- Façade of Selmun Palace

- Location within Malta
- Alternative names: Selmun Tower; Selmun Castle

General information
- Status: Intact
- Type: Villa
- Architectural style: Baroque
- Location: Selmun, Mellieħa, Malta
- Coordinates: 35°57′33.2″N 14°22′53.5″E
- Completed: 18th century
- Client: Monte della Redenzione degli Schiavi
- Owner: Government of Malta

Technical details
- Material: Limestone

Design and construction
- Architect: possibly Domenico Cachia

Selmun Palace (Maltese: Il-Palazz ta' Selmun), also known as Selmun Tower, is a villa on the Selmun Peninsula in Mellieħa, Malta. It was built in the 18th century by the Monte della Redenzione degli Schiavi, funded by the Monte di Pietà. The palace was located on the grounds of a hotel until it closed in 2011.

== History ==
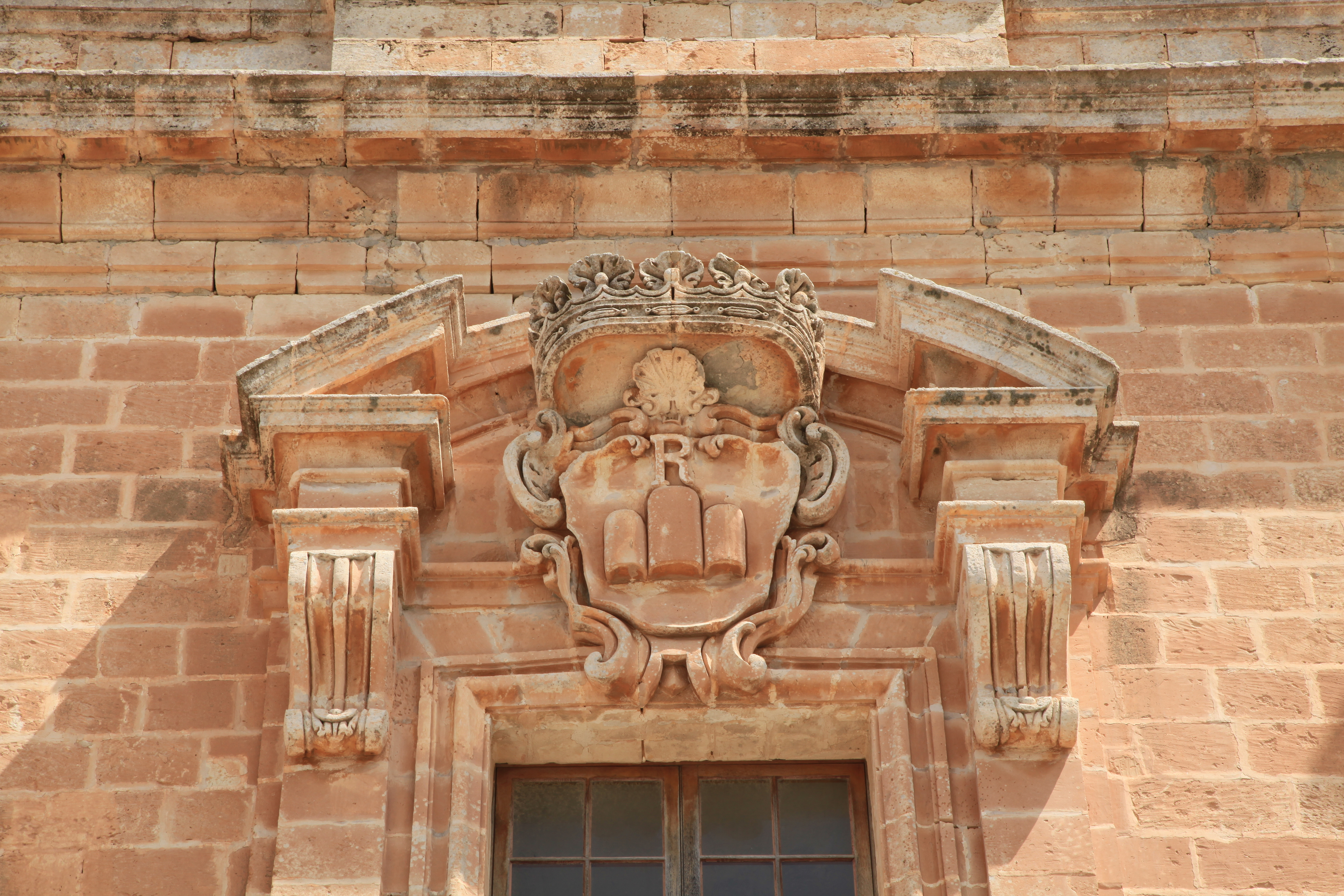
Coat of arms of the Monte della Redenzione degli Schiavi on the palace's façade

Selmun Palace was built by the Monte della Redenzione degli Schiavi, a charity that was founded during the reign of Grand Master Alof de Wignacourt in 1607 to finance the redemption of Christians enslaved by Ottomans or Barbary corsairs. The site of the villa originally contained a coastal lookout post, and it was part of a large estate which also included the Mistra Gate. The estate had been left to the Monte di Redenzione by the noblewoman Caterina Vitale upon her death in 1619. The villa used to be rented out to knights of the Order of Saint John as a place to relax and hunt wild rabbits, which were commonly found in the area. The rent money contributed to the redemption fund.

The villa itself was built some time in the 18th century, although the exact date of construction is not known. The earliest record of the structure is on a 1783 map, when it was referred to as Torre Nuova (new tower). The palace's architect is unknown, but it is sometimes attributed to Domenico Cachia or Tumas Cachia.

During the period of the Maltese rebellion against the French, the British utilised the villa as a naval hospital, the first in Malta to be used for such purpose.

In the 1840s, a semaphore station was installed on the villa. The building was mentioned in the Antiquities List of 1925.

=== Hotel ===
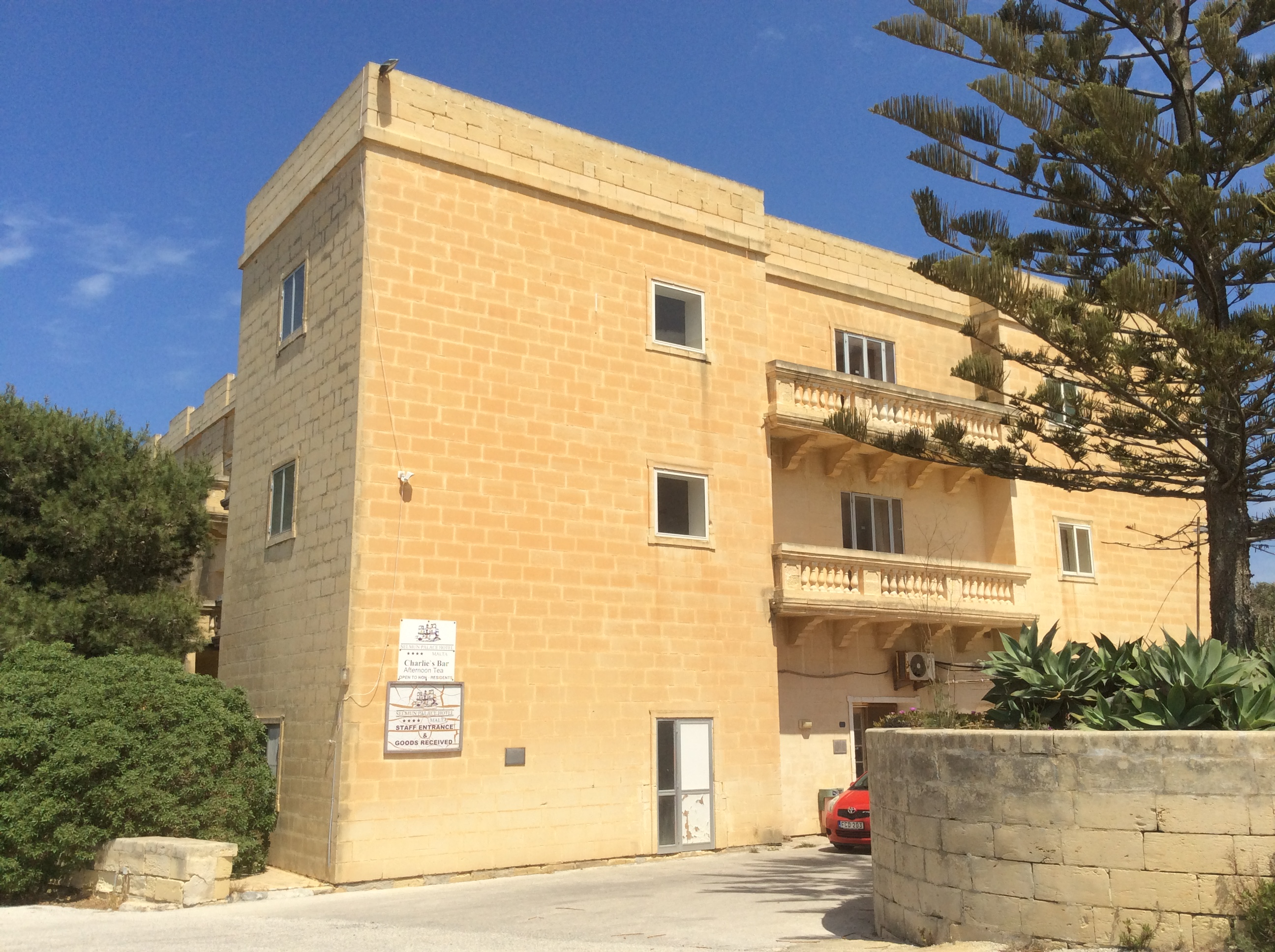
Selmun Palace Hotel

A hotel known as Selmun Palace Hotel was built close to the villa, and it was owned by Selmun Palace Hotel Company Ltd, a subsidiary of Air Malta. Some suites were included in the villa itself, which was also used as a wedding venue.

The hotel was closed in January 2011 as part of a restructuring strategy in which Air Malta began to focus solely on the airline industry instead of other operations. Plans are being made to sell the hotel to the government, while the construction of a new wing for the hotel has also been proposed.

Selmun Palace was scheduled by the Malta Environment and Planning Authority (MEPA) as a Grade 1 national monument on 10 January 2012. It is in need of restoration.

== Architecture ==
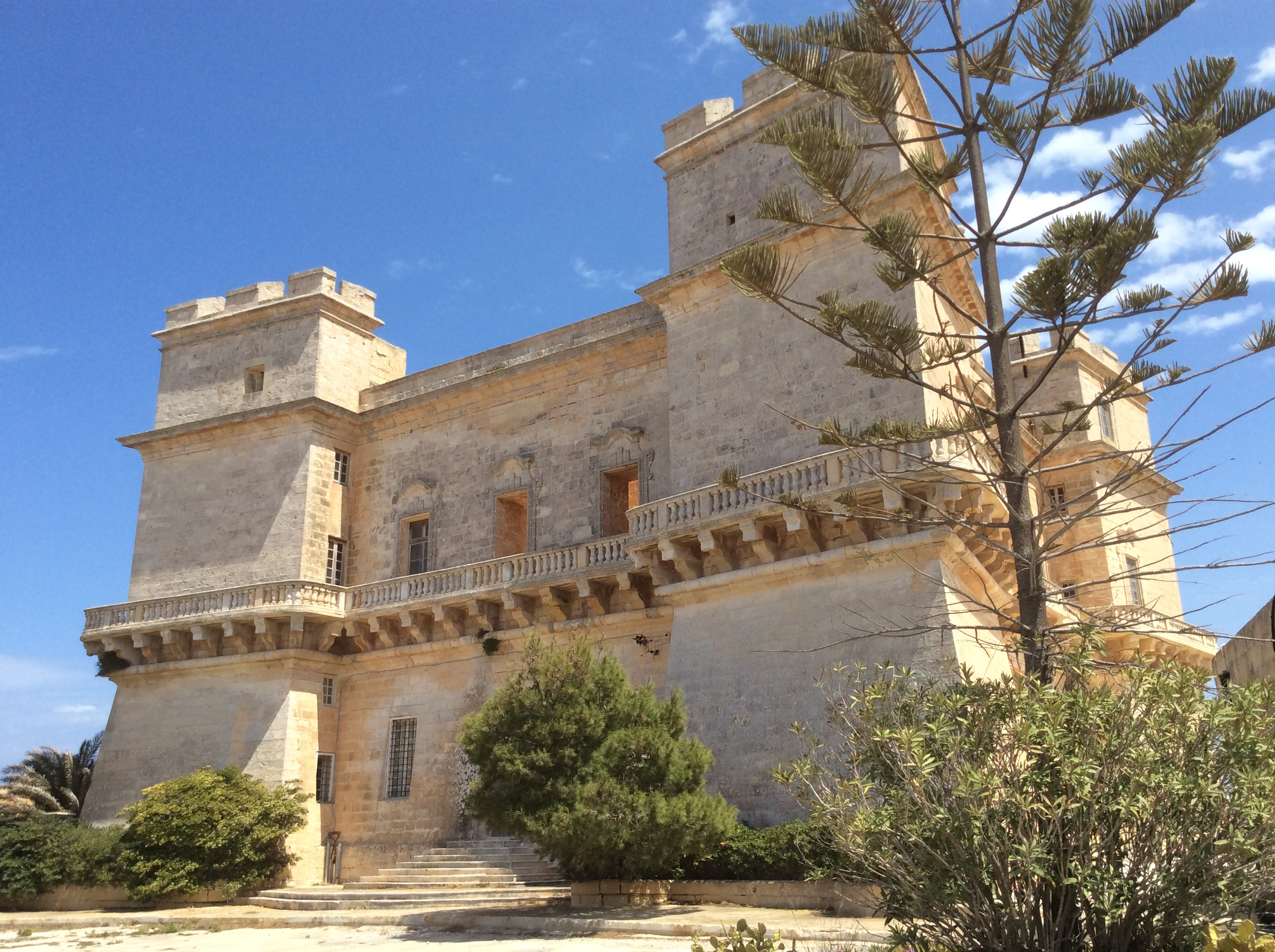
View of the Selmun Palace

Selmun Palace is an example of Baroque architecture. It has a square plan with four pseudo-bastions on each side, the design of which was inspired by the Verdala Palace and the Wignacourt towers. These bastions as well as fake embrasures were mainly built for aesthetic purposes, and the structure was never intended for military use. Despite this, it served as a deterrent for corsairs looking for a potential landing spot, since it looked like a military outpost when viewed from the sea. The main facade has three doors, with the main one being surrounded by a decorative portal. An ornate window on the upper floor and a bell-cot on the roof surmount the main door. A balcony surrounds the perimeter of the entire building.

A chapel dedicated to Our Lady of Ransom was located within the villa. In the 1980s, a new chapel with the same dedication was built outside the villa.

== See also ==
- List of Baroque residences
