= Banca Giuratale =

Banca Giuratale may refer to the following buildings in Malta:

- Banca Giuratale (Valletta)
  - the original Banca Giuratale of Valletta, now known as the Monte di Pietà (Malta)
- Banca Giuratale (Mdina)
  - the original Banca Giuratale of Mdina, demolished to make way for Palazzo Vilhena
- Banca Giuratale (Victoria, Gozo)
