= Saverio Cassar =

Maltese priest, politician, and commander

The Reverend Monsignor Saverio Cassar
- Archpriest of the Matrice of the Assumption; Governor-General of Gozo
- Church: Roman Catholic
- Diocese: Malta

Orders
- Ordination: 30 March 1771

Personal details
- Born: 29 December 1746 Hospitaller Malta
- Died: 16 December 1805 (aged 58) Malta Protectorate
- Buried: Cathedral of the Assumption, Victoria

Saverio Cassar

Governor-General of Gozo
- In office 28 October 1798 – 20 August 1801
- Monarch: Ferdinand III
- Succeeded by: Emmanuele Vitale

Saverio Cassar (29 December 1746 – 16 December 1805) was a Gozitan priest and patriot, who was Governor-general of an independent Gozo from 1798 to 1801.

Cassar was born in Għajnsielem, in Nadur parish, Gozo on 29 December 1746. He studied in Rome, being ordained a priest on 30 March 1771. He was nominated archpriest of the Gozo Matrice in 1773, and he became Provicar of Gozo in 1775.

On 3 September 1798, Gozitans rebelled against the French occupiers, and on 18 September Cassar was appointed head of the Government and Superintendent of the Island of Gozo. The French garrisons at the Cittadella and Fort Chambray surrendered to the British on 28 and 29 October, and the British handed over the island to Cassar. He subsequently ruled Gozo as an independent state, recognizing Ferdinand III of Sicily as king. Cassar also petitioned for establishing Gozo as a separate diocese (the Roman Catholic Diocese of Gozo was eventually created in 1864).

The Maltese Congress of Mdina disapproved of Cassar's actions, and on 20 August 1801 the British appointed Emmanuele Vitale as Governor of Gozo instead of Cassar.

Cassar died on 16 December 1805 at the age of 58.
