= Gozo (1798–1800) =

Unrecognised state of Gozo (1798–1801)

Coordinates: 36°02′36″N 14°14′49″E

The Gozitan Nation La Nazione Gozitana (Italian) In-Nazzjon Għawdxi (Maltese)
- 1798–1801
- Flag

- Location of Gozo within the Maltese Islands
- Status: Unrecognised state De facto independent state
- Capital: Rabat
- Common languages: Italian; Maltese
- Religion: Roman Catholicism
- Government: Provisional feudal monarchy
- King
  - 1798–1801: Ferdinand III of Sicily
- Governor-General
  - 1798–1801: Saverio Cassar
- Historical era: French Revolutionary Wars
  - Revolt: 3 September 1798
  - Established: 28/29 October 1798
  - British protectorate established: 4 September 1800
  - Disestablished: 20 August 1801
- Currency: Maltese scudo
Preceded by	Succeeded by
French occupation of Malta	Malta Protectorate
- Today part of: Malta

The Gozitan Nation, (Note: Italian: La Nazione Gozitana; Maltese: In-Nazzjon Għawdxija) commonly known as Gozo, (Note: Maltese: Għawdex) was an unrecognised state located on the island of Gozo between 1798 and 1801 during the French Revolutionary Wars. It was a monarchy recognising the authority of Ferdinand III of Sicily with a provisional government led by Governor-General Saverio Cassar. Its capital was Rabat. The country was established between 28 and 29 October 1798 from the territory of French-occupied Malta and was eventually incorporated into Malta Protectorate on 20 August 1801.

== History ==
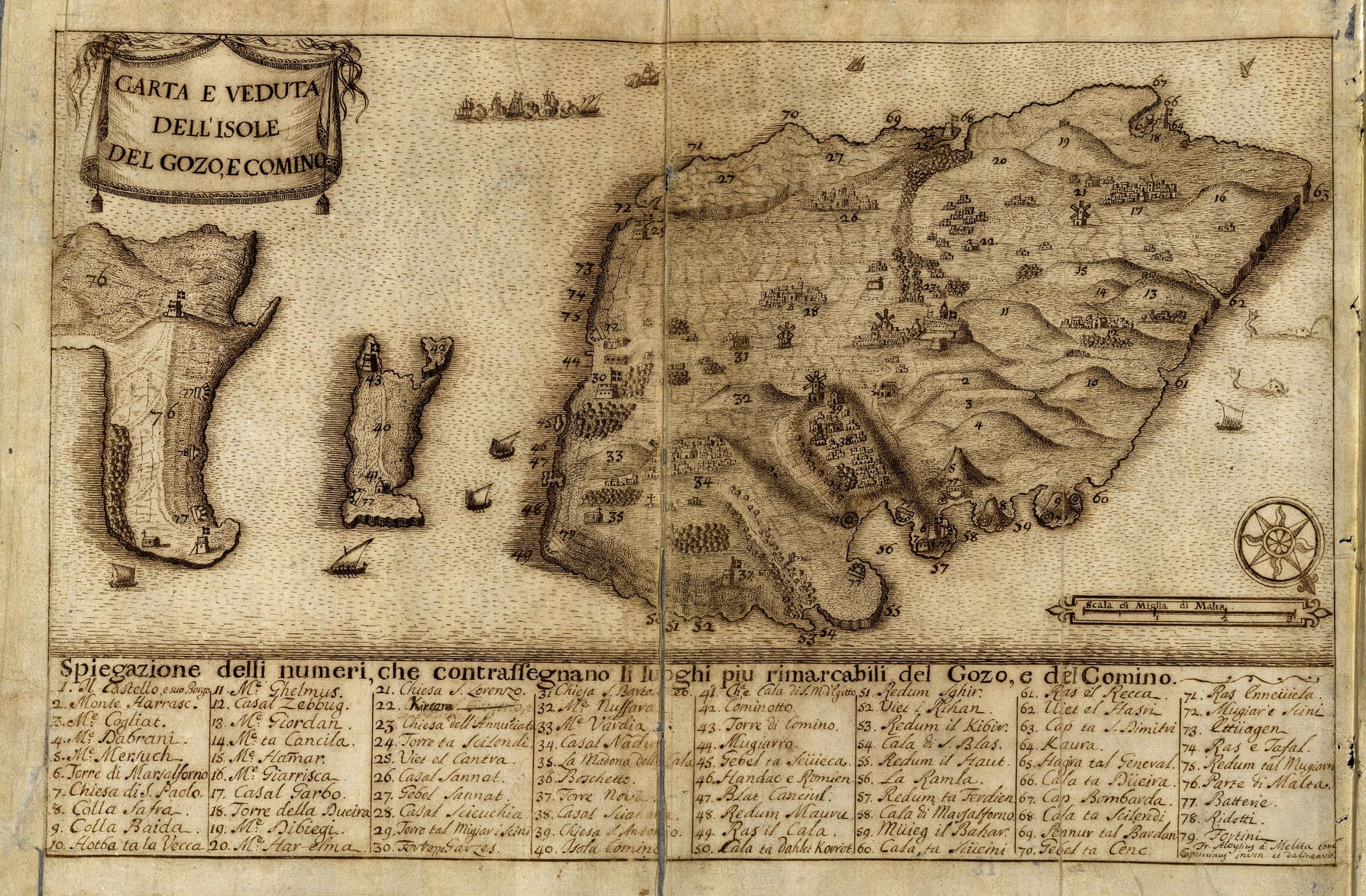
Map of Gozo c. 1745

Until 10 June 1798, Malta and Gozo had been administered by the Knights Hospitaller. When Napoleon ousted the Knights from the islands in the Mediterranean campaign of 1798, the French established garrisons in various locations in Malta, as well as the Cittadella and Fort Chambray, the main fortifications on Gozo.

On 2 September 1798, the Maltese rebelled against the French in Mdina, requesting to return to rule by the Kingdom of Sicily. Word spread, and the Gozitans revolted on 3 September. The archpriest and parish priest of Rabat, Saverio Cassar, was chosen as the revolt's leader on 18 September. The rebel headquarters was established in the Banca Giuratale (which is now the seat of the Victoria Local Council). Cassar organised the dejma and collected money to pay the troops under his command. Pro-French partisans were arrested, including three canons.

The French garrison held out in the Cittadella and Fort Chambray until they capitulated on 28 October after negotiations made with the help of Alexander Ball. The 217 French soldiers there agreed to surrender without a fight and transferred the island, its fortifications, 24 cannons, a large quantity of ammunition, and 3200 sacks of flour to the British.

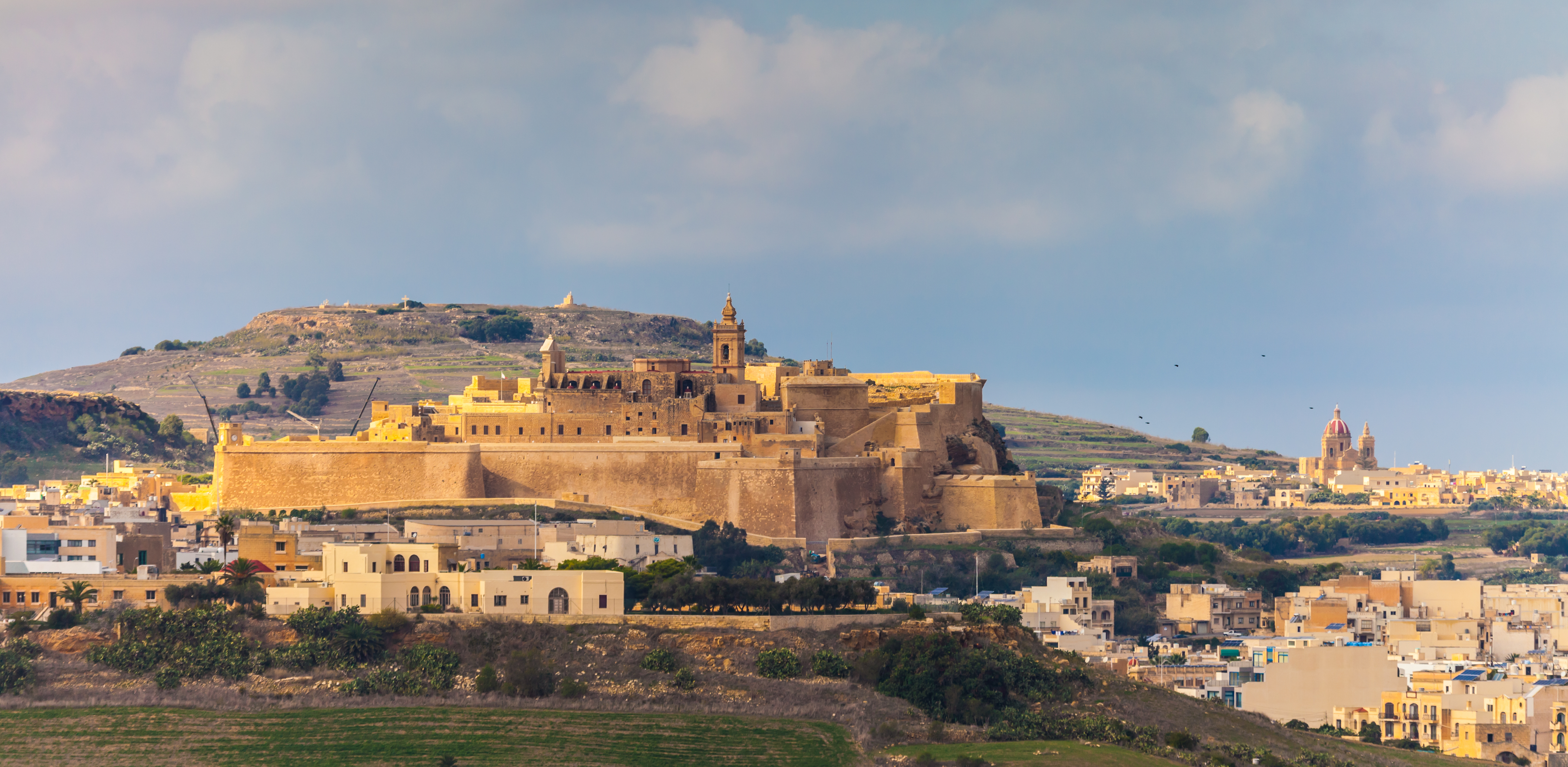
The Cittadella, which the British transferred to the Gozitans on 29 October 1798

A day later, the British transferred control of the Cittadella and the rest of the island to the Gozitans. The people declared King Ferdinand as their monarch and established a provisional government led by Saverio Cassar, who became governor-general. The provisional government included several British and Maltese representatives, and their first action was to distribute the captured food supplies to the island's 16,000 inhabitants. The Neapolitan flag (which later became the flag of the Two Sicilies) was flown over Gozo, and munitions and supplies arrived from Naples, with King Ferdinand praising his "faithful Maltese subjects."

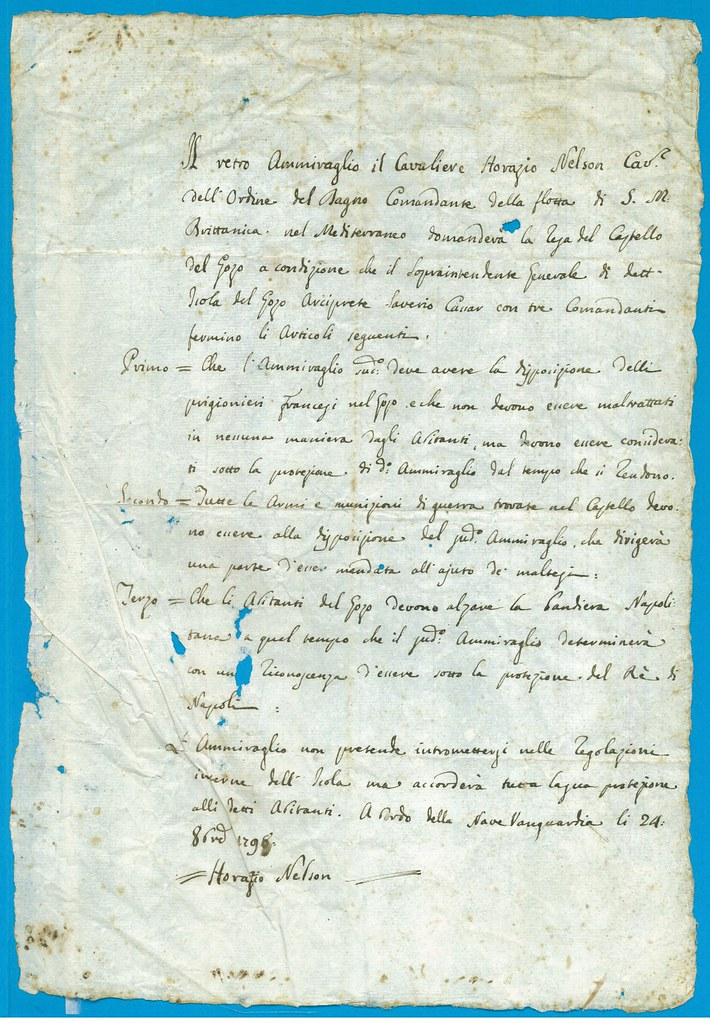
The capitulation of the French forces in Gozo was signed on 28 October 1798.

On 29 October, Cassar requested that Gozo become a separate diocese. The Roman Catholic Diocese of Gozo was eventually created on 22 September 1864, 65 years after Cassar's petition. During Cassar's rule of Gozo, he organised the administration, reopened the law courts and elected new jurists; and even opened a customs house.

King Ferdinand took advantage of Napoleon's absence in the French campaign in Egypt and Syria and of Horatio Nelson's victories and seized Rome on 29 November. On the defeat of some of his columns, Ferdinand hurried back to Naples. On the approach of the French, Ferdinand fled on 23 December aboard Nelson's ship HMS Vanguard to Palermo, leaving his capital in a state of anarchy. The French took Naples and the Parthenopean Republic was established by its citizens; Ferdinand reconquered it in May 1800.

When the French garrison in Valletta surrendered in September of that same year, the British established the Malta Protectorate. Cassar continued to rule Gozo independently until 20 August 1801, when the British civil commissioner, Charles Cameron, removed him from the position. Emmanuel Vitale, another leader of the Maltese insurrection, became governor, superintendent and the health director of Gozo, a post which he held until his death fourteen months later.

On 16 December 1805, Cassar died at the age of 58.
