= Governor of Gozo =

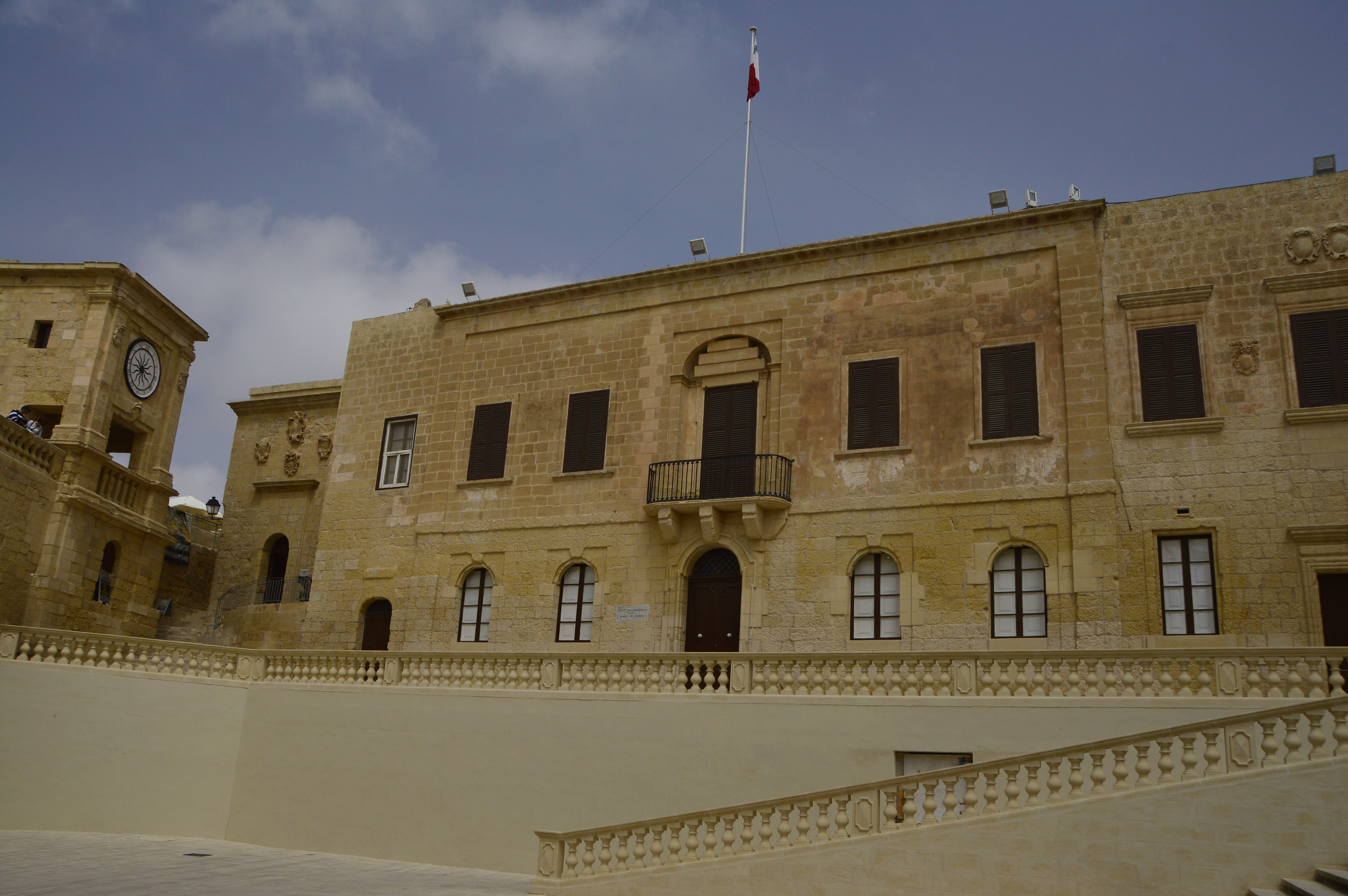
- The Governor's Palace in the Cittadella
- Seat: Governor's Palace, Rabat, Gozo
- Formation: 1530
- First holder: Giovanni de Soria
- Final holder: Filippo Castagna
- Abolished: 1814
- Succession: Chief civil officer

The Governor of Gozo was the administrator of Gozo, in what is today Malta, between 1530 and 1814. The office was established under Hospitaller rule, and abolished during the early years of British rule in Malta, when chief civil officers were first appointed to administer the island.

The seat of the Governor was a building in the Cittadella known as the Governor's Palace, constructed in the 17th century during the magistracy of Alof de Wignacourt. The building is now a courthouse.

== Governors ==
=== Hospitaller governors ===
Governor	Took office	Left office
Giovanni de Soria	1530	1531
Antonio di Platamone	1531	1532
Francesco di Platamone (1st term)	1532	1533
Andrea Mannara	1533	1534
Bartolomeo di Platamone	1534	1536
Francesco di Platamone (2nd term)	1536	1538
Alonso de Montagnes	1538	1539
Didaco Cervantes de Bobadilla	1539	1540
Calcerano Mompalao	1542	1543
Alonso de Vagas	1544	1545
Nicolo Caxaro	1545	1546
Giulio Savona	1548	1549
Andrea Castelletti	1550	1551
Galatian de Sesse	1551	1551
Pedro de Olivares	1553	1560
Antoine de Fay (dit St.-Romain)	1560	1561
Janotto Torrellas	1565	1567
Isidoro d'Arguiz	1567	1568
Roderico Cortez	1572	1573
Nicola Tornaquinci	1573	1575
Bernard de Aldana	1581	1583
George Fortuyn	1583	1584
Octave de Castellane	1584	1585
Pietro Spina	1586	1594
Faustino Bulgarini	c. 1592	1595
Pietro de Sangro	1596	1597
Giovanni Andrea Capece	1597	1599
Baldassare Manilla	1599	1601
Ferdinando Rosselimini (Rossermini)	1601	1605
François Mansell (Munsell) Saint-Leger	1606	1609
Eugenio Ramirez Maldonato	1610	1612
Farnçois de Cremaulx	1613	1614
Jacques de Bovain dit Colubieres (Bouvin La Rognosa)	1614	1616
Jean de Mars-Liviers	1616	1617
Jacques-Christophe de Andlau	1617	1618
Richard de Nini Claret	1618	1622
Ludovico Vasconcelos	1622	1623
Pierre de Carvel-de-Merey	1623	1624
Jean-Baptiste de Galéan-Chateauneuf	1625	1626
François du Puy-Trigonan	1628	1629
Jean de Tiembrune-Valence	1630	1631
Stefano del Portico	1631	1633
Alexandre de Benque	1633	1635
Henri de Lates-Entraygues	1635	1637
Honore de Lascaris	1638	1639
Jerome de Galean-Chateauneuf	1639	1640
Jean-Scipio de Grailles-Chalettes	1641	1642
Antoine Le Fort-Bennebost	1644	1645
Henri de Villeneuve-Thorens	1645	1646
Francisco de Salinas	1647	1649
Joseph de Panisse	1649	1650
Philibert de Cleron	1651	1652
Isidoro de Arguiz y Antillon	1653	1654
François de Vintimille-Montpezat	1655	1656
François-Guillaume de Neulandt	1657	1658
Joseph del Vayo y Agreda	1660	1661
Erasmo de Albito	1661	1662
Fabio Gori Pannellini	1663	1664
Giovanni Cassia	1664	1665
Ludovico Xedler y Gomez (1st term)	1665	1666
Alessandro Fattinelli	1666	1667
Ludovico Xedler y Gomez (2nd term)	1667	1669/70
Carlo de Quirault	1670	1671
Ottavio Tancredi	1671	1673
Ludovico Xedler y Gomez (3rd term)	1673	1676
Francisco de Cordoba	1676	1678
Etienne Pinto de Mirandal	1678	1679
Pietro Gorgona	1680	1681
Henri de Gratet de Dolomieu	1682	1683
Albert de Banquemare	1684	1685
Luigi Venato	1686	1687
Girolamo Albergotti	1688	1689
Ignazio Lores	1690	1691
Rene de Marconnay de Cursay	1692	1693
Marc' Antoine de Galean	1696	1697
Octave de Galean	1697	1699
François du Hamel	1699	1700
Charles-Louis de Dautesar-Doradur	1701	1703
George de La Rue	1703	1704
Pierre-Nicolas Contet d'Aulanay	1705	1706
Cinto de Montfort	1706	1707
Alessandro Battali	1710	1711
Claude de Fontanet la Valette	1711	1712
Diego Garcia de Mula	1714	1715
Pierre de Castellane	1716	1717
Rene de Marbeuf	1718	1720
Giovanni Giuseppe Caxaro (acting for Marbeuf)	1719	1720
Michel de Guast	22 January 1720	1721
Paul-Antoine de Barbantane	1722	1723
Giuseppe Cassar	1729	1729
Paolo Antonio de Viguier	c. 1729	c. 1729
Vincent de Vogue-Courdan	1730	1731
Paul Antoine de Viguier	1731/32	1734
Hubert de Martenville	1734	1735
Pierre Dupeyroux	1735	1736
Bernadin de Marbeuf	1738	1739
Sevrin du Quenoy	1740	1741
Karl Friedrich Freiherr von Remching	1742	1743
François Alexandre de Vauchelle	1743	1744
Joseph Gabriel d'Olivary	1744	1745
Claude Joseph de Castellane	1746	1747
Charles de Guast (1st term)	1748	1749
Jacques-François de Chambray (1687–1756)	1749	1750
Pietro Sarsana (Pietro Paolo Zarcona)	1750	1752
Charles Auguste Grelier de Concise (1st term)	1752	1753
Charles Auguste Grelier de Concise (2nd term)	1754	1754
Alexandre Dussel de Chasteauvert (1st term)	1754	1755
Alexandre Dussel de Chasteauvert (2nd term)	1756	1757
Charles de Guast (2nd term)	1758	1764
Bernardo Rondinelli	1764	1765
Charles de Guast (3rd term)	1765	1766
Klemens Fürst von Hohenlohe-Waldenburg-Bartenstein, Prince Clemente Armando Hohenlohe (1st term) (1732–1792)	1774	1775
Klemens Fürst von Hohenlohe-Waldenburg-Bartenstein, Prince Clemente Armando Hohenlohe (2nd term) (1732–1792)	1778	1779
Giuseppe Bonelli	1781	1782
Ugolino Cambi	1784	1787
Gilberto Maria des Boys	1787	1798
Pierre Antoine Charles de Mesgrigny de Villebertain (1747–1828)	1798	12 June 1798

=== French occupation ===
Gozo was invaded by French troops in June 1798, and they occupied the island until October 1798, when they evacuated the island after a rebellion broke out. During the French occupation, no Governors were appointed, and instead the island was administered by:

- Commander: Jean-Louis Ebénézer Reynier (1771–1814)
- Lord Lieutenant: Count Romualdo Barbaro (1771–1840)

=== De facto independence ===
Governor-General	Took office	Left office
Saverio Cassar (1746–1805)	18 September 1798	20 August 1801

=== British rule ===
Governor	Took office	Left office
Emmanuele Vitale (1758–1802)	20 August 1801	8 October 1802
Filippo Castagna (1765–1830)	19 October 1802	15 October 1814
