= Mistra Gate =

- Bieb tal-Mistra
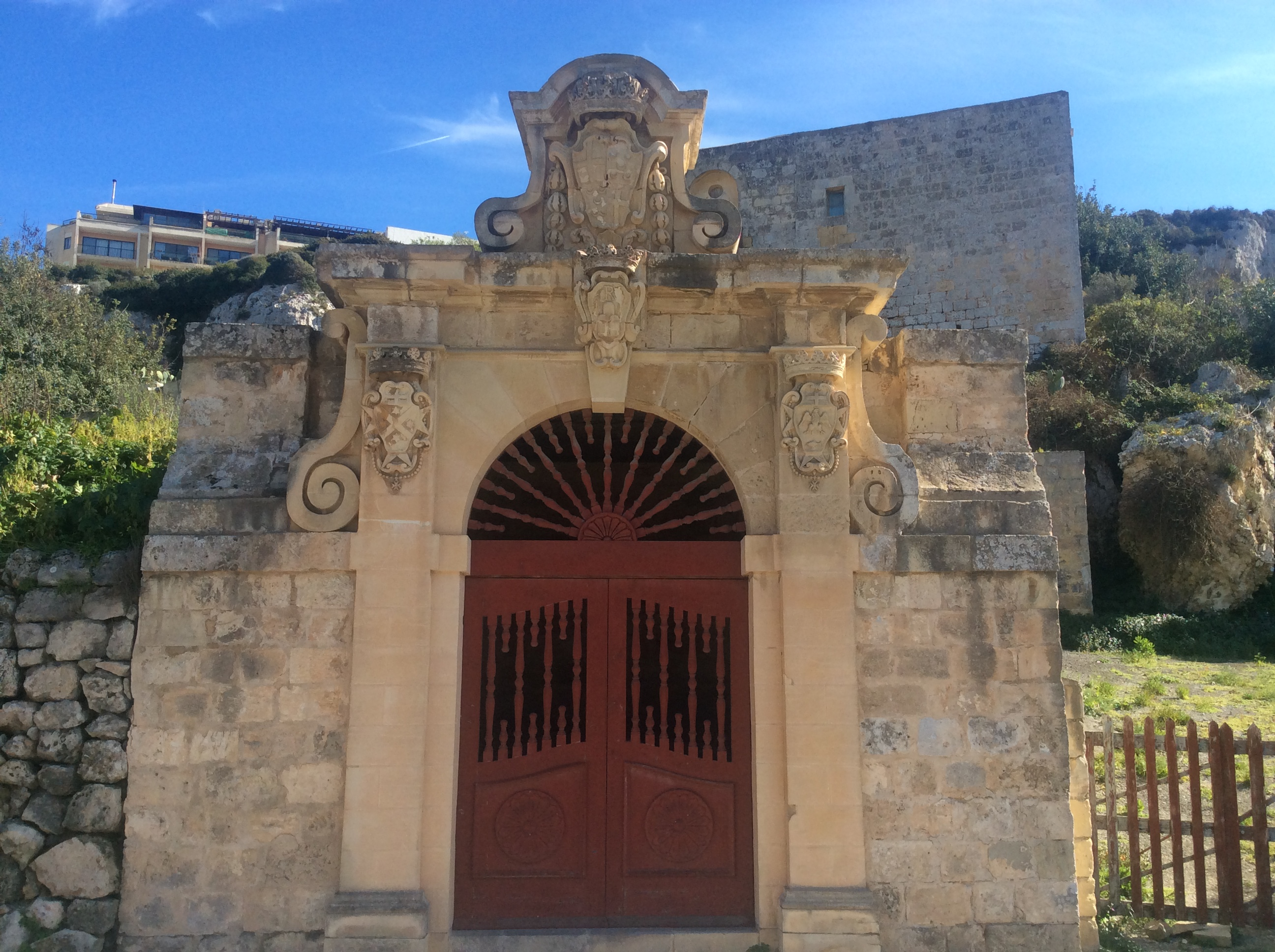
- View of the Mistra Gate
- Interactive map of Mistra Gate

General information
- Status: Intact
- Type: Gateway
- Architectural style: Baroque
- Location: St. Paul's Bay, Malta
- Coordinates: 35°57′11.4″N 14°22′58.3″E
- Completed: 1760
- Renovated: 1937 and 1995–98 (major restorations)
- Client: Monte della Redenzione degli Schiavi
- Owner: Government of Malta

Technical details
- Material: Limestone

Mistra Gate (Maltese: Bieb tal-Mistra) is an ornate gateway in the limits of St. Paul's Bay, Malta. It was built in 1760 as the entrance to a large estate belonging to the Monte della Redenzione degli Schiavi. The gate was extensively restored in 1937 and again in the 1990s.

== History ==
The Mistra Gate was built in 1760 as the main gateway to a large estate which belonged to the Monte della Redenzione degli Schiavi, an institution which had been set up by Alof de Wignacourt in 1607 in order to redeem Christian slaves in Muslim territories. The estate had been bequeathed to the Monte di Redenzione by the noblewoman Caterina Vitale in 1619, and it included the land on which Selmun Palace was later built.

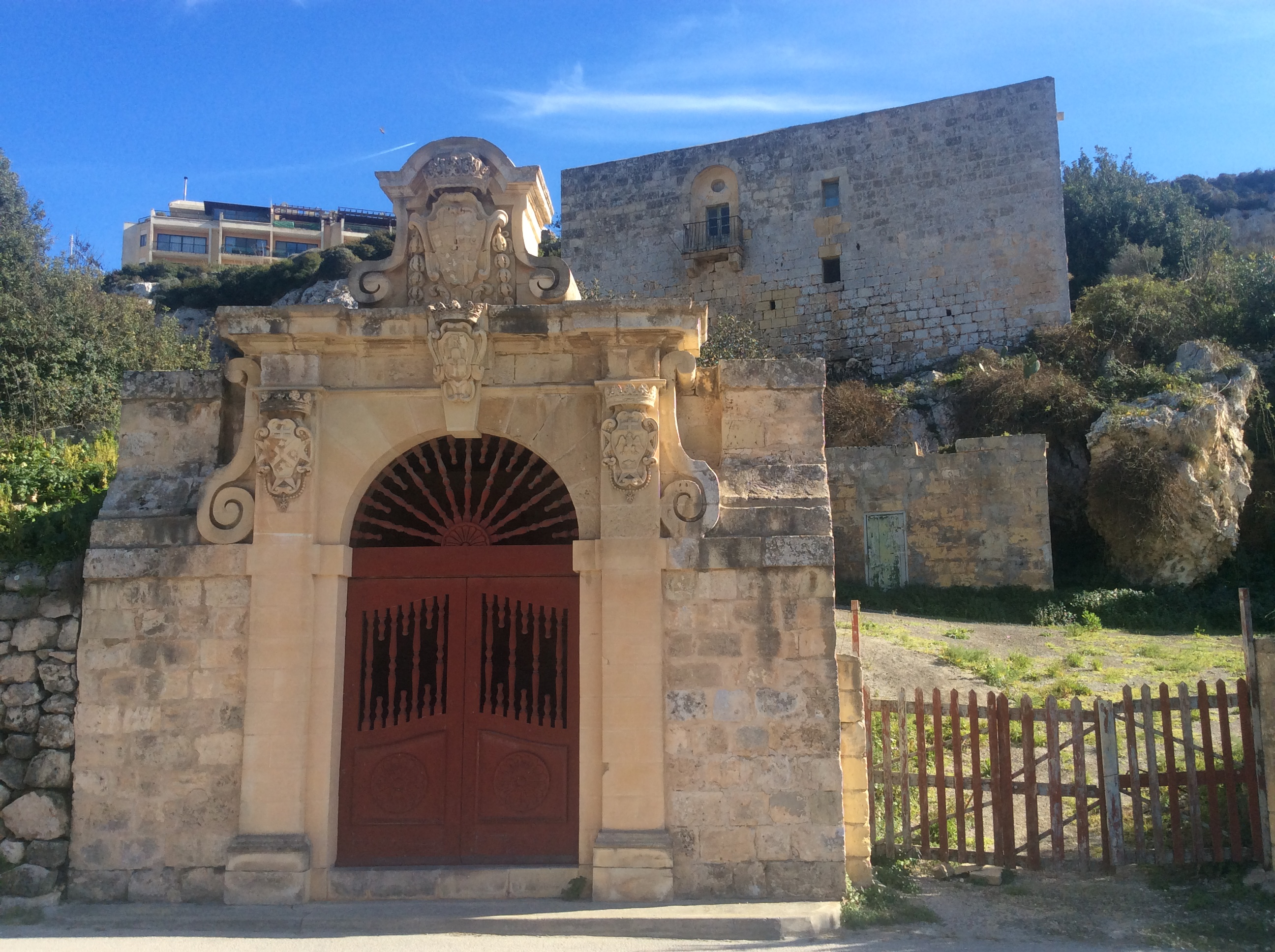
The gate and farmhouse

The Mistra Gate is built in the Baroque style, and it is decorated with the coats of arms of Grand Master Manuel Pinto da Fonseca, the Monte di Redenzione, Balì Claudius de Montagne de Lafeuliere and Balì Carlo Maria Olgiati. A farmhouse which was also part of the estate is located close to the gate. In addition, a marker indicating the limits of the property belonging to the Monte di Redenzione can also be found nearby.

The estate became government property in 1798, when the funds of the Monte di Redenzione were transferred to the state during the French occupation of Malta.

== Restorations ==
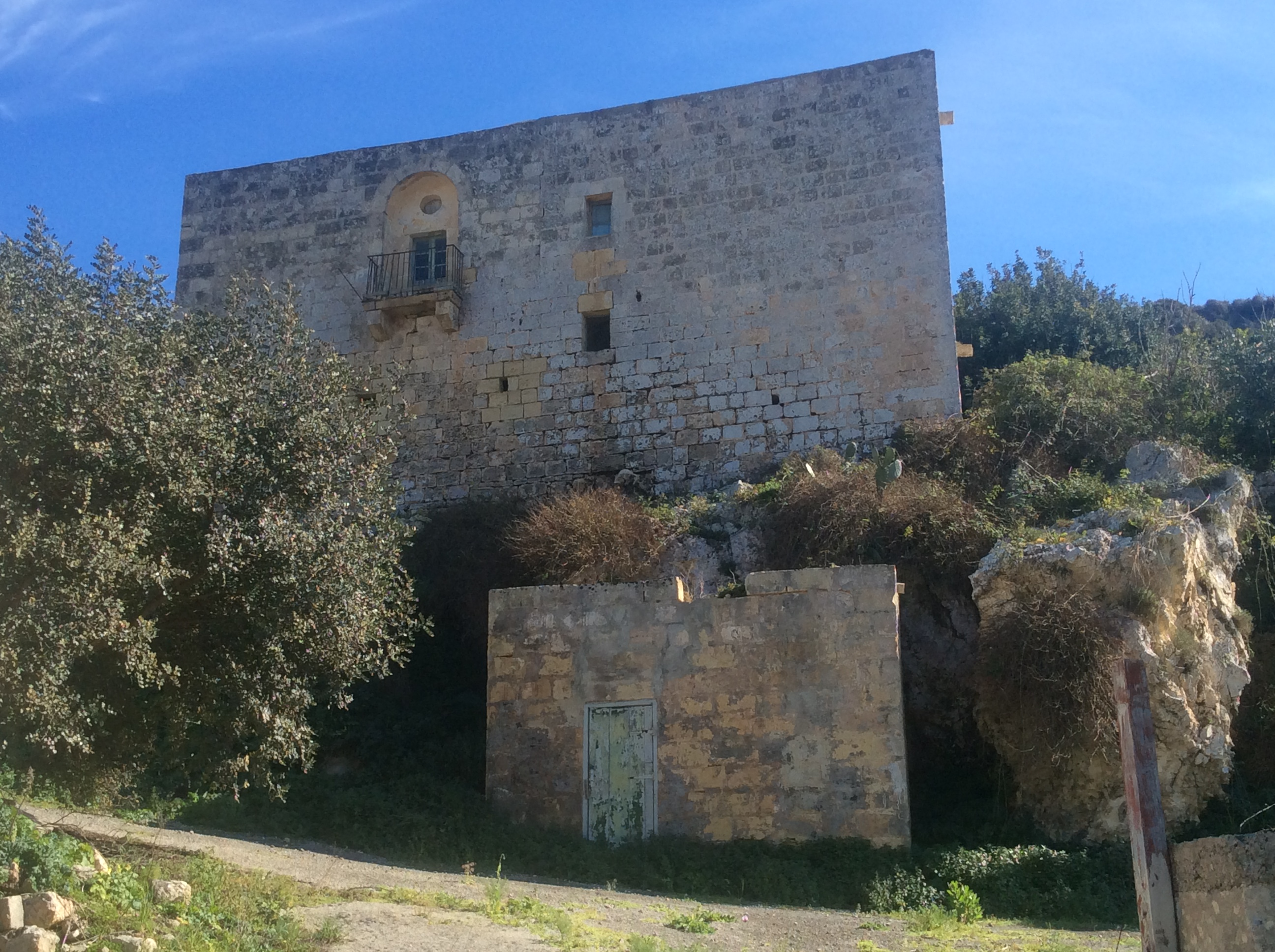
The farmhouse near the gate

In 1937, the gate was restored by the Public Works Department and the Museums Department. Throughout this restoration, the gate was completely rebuilt, and a new timber door was affixed.

The gate deteriorated greatly throughout the 20th century. In 1995 and 1996, students from the Faculty of Architecture and Civil Engineering at the University of Malta surveyed the gate. Since the gate's façade was inclined outwards, it was decided to dismantle and rebuild the gate. The door was replaced once again, and new wooden beams were installed. This restoration was carried out by the NGO Din l-Art Ħelwa and was sponsored by the Corinthia Group of Companies. It was completed in 1998.

The gate is located close to the Mistra Bridge. Today, the gate is scheduled as a Grade 1 national monument by the Malta Environment and Planning Authority. The nearby farmhouse and property marker are scheduled as Grade 2.
