= Filippo Castagna =

- Filippu Castagna

Governor of Gozo
- In office 1802–1814
- Preceded by: Emmanuele Vitale
- Succeeded by: Office abolished

Personal details
- Born: 19 November 1765 Għaxaq, Malta
- Died: 26 January 1830 (aged 64) Malta
- Occupation: Politician

Filippo Castagna (Maltese: Filippu Castagna, 19 November 1765 – 26 January 1830) was a Maltese politician of the late 18th and early 19th centuries.

Castagna was born in Għaxaq on 19 November 1765. During the French occupation of Malta in 1798, he was chosen as a representative of the municipality of Żurrieq, Safi, Kirkop and Gudja. When a rebellion against French rule broke out in September 1798, Castagna supported the rebel cause and he was involved in the capture of Saint Thomas Tower from the French. On 18 February 1799, he was elected as a representative of Gudja to the rebel Consiglio Popolare. He was also appointed as inspector of fortifications by the British Civil Commissioner Alexander Ball.

After the French surrendered and Malta became a British protectorate, Castagna was appointed as the luogotenente of Senglea and Cospicua. In November 1801, he was part of a delegation of six representatives (Note: The other five were the Marquis Mario Testaferrata, the priests Pietro Mallia and Emmanuele Ricaud, the engineer Michele Cachia and the gentleman Antonio Mallia.) who travelled to London to present the needs of the Maltese people to the British government. Civil Commissioner Charles Cameron described him as being popular, wise and having moderate views. After the death of Emmanuele Vitale in 1802, Castagna was appointed Governor of Gozo, and he held this position until it was abolished in 1814.

Castagna retired in 1814 and he moved to a house in St George's Bay in Birżebbuġa. He died on 26 January 1830 after a long illness, and he was buried inside the Għaxaq parish church.
