= Banca Giuratale (Victoria, Gozo) =

City hall of Victoria, Gozo, Malta

- Banka Ġuratali
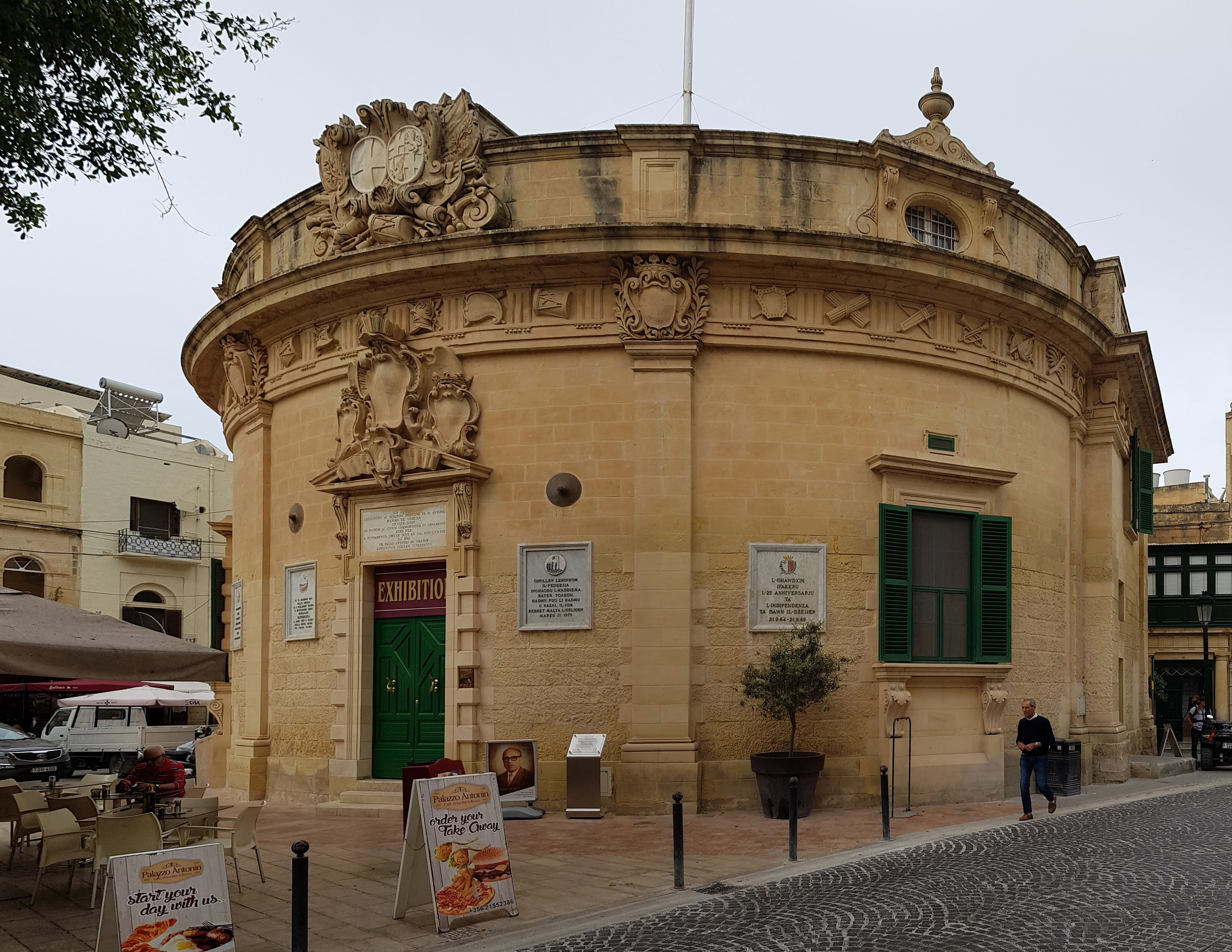
- Façade of the Banca Giuratale in 2019
- Interactive map of the Banca Giuratale area

General information
- Status: Intact
- Type: City hall
- Architectural style: Baroque
- Location: Victoria, Gozo, Malta
- Coordinates: 36°2′41.5″N 14°14′20.1″E
- Current tenants: Victoria Local Council; Gozo Regional Committee; Ministry for Gozo
- Completed: 1733
- Renovated: 1868 or 1875
- Owner: Government of Malta

Technical details
- Material: Limestone
- Floor count: 2

Design and construction
- Architect: Charles François de Mondion

Renovating team
- Architect: Giovanni Bonello

The Banca Giuratale (Maltese: Banka Ġuratali) is the city hall of Victoria, Gozo, Malta. It was built in the 18th century as the seat of the Università of Gozo. Over the years, it housed several government departments and also served as a police station and a post office. The building is currently the seat of the Victoria Local Council and the Gozo Regional Committee, and also houses the culture and information sections of the Ministry for Gozo.

== History ==
The Banca Giuratale was originally built in 1733 to house the Università of Gozo, the administrative council which had jurisdiction over the islands of Gozo and Comino. The building was designed by the French architect Charles François de Mondion, and was inaugurated by the Governor of Gozo, Pablo Antonio de Viguier.

In 1798, the Banca Giuratale served as the headquarters of the rebels during the Gozitan uprising against French occupation. The rebels would eventually establish an independent state known as La Nazione Gozitana, which lasted until 1801.

The Università system was abolished by Governor Thomas Maitland in 1819, and the building was subsequently used as a police station, post office, the Public Archives and the Agriculture Department. The building was enlarged to its present form in 1868 or 1875, to a design by Giovanni Bonello. Its name was included in the Antiquities List of 1925.

From 1961 to 1973, the Banca Giuratale was the seat of the Gozo Civic Council. Since 1994, the building has returned to its original role as a city hall, housing the Victoria Local Council. The Banca Giuratale also houses the culture and information sections of the Ministry for Gozo, and since 2009, it has also been the seat of the Gozo Regional Committee. Exhibitions are regularly held at the building.

The Banca Giuratale of Gozo, along with that of Mdina, was depicted on the Lm2 banknote that was in circulation between 1989 and 2007.

The façade of the Banca Giuratale was restored in 2014.

== Architecture ==
The Banca Giuratale is built in the Baroque style, and is regarded as one of the finest Baroque buildings in Gozo. It was originally a rectangular structure, but in the 19th century an ornate semi-circular façade was added. The original façade still exists within the interior of the building.
