= Caterina Vitale =

First female pharmacist and chemist in Malta

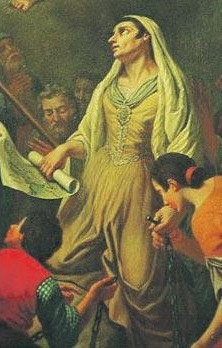
- Born: 1566; Greece
- Died: 1619 (aged 52–53); Syracuse, Sicily
- Resting place: Carmelite Church, Valletta
- Known for: 1st Maltese woman pharmacist and chemist, Knights Hospitaller pharmacist
- Spouse: Ettore Vitale
- Scientific career
- Fields: Chemistry; pharmacology
- Institutions: Knights Hospitaller

Caterina Vitale (1566–1619) was the first female pharmacist and chemist in Malta, and the first female pharmacist of the Knights Hospitaller.

Caterina Vitale was originally from Greece. She married Ettore Vitale, pharmacist of the Knights Hospitaller, when she was a teenager. Upon his death in 1590, she inherited his pharmacy and the task of providing pharmacies to the Sacra Infermeria. She was described as a successful businessperson, became very rich, and is known as a benefactor of the Carmelites.

Being in an uncommon position for a woman, she was a controversial person and the subjects of legends, libelous slander and rumours, and was accused of being an enterprising prostitute, litigator and sadistic torturer of slaves.

She died in 1619 at Syracuse and her body was brought to Valletta and buried at the Carmelite Church. To the left and right as you enter the church are her tombstone, and the tombstone of Caterina Scappi, the founder of the first hospital for women in Malta.

Upon her death she bequeathed part of her fortune and her property Selmun Palace to the Monte della Redenzione degli Schiavi, a charity founded during the reign of Grand Master Alof de Wignacourt in 1607 to finance the redemption of the Maltese who had fallen into slavery. She also left legacies to the Order of Malta, to her niece, to the Carmelites, to the Greek Church, but left nothing to her daughter.

== See also ==
- Timeline of women in science
