= 1973 Gozo Civic Council referendum =

11 November 1973
- Do you want Gozo to remain different from Malta, that is, not only having its own representatives in Parliament, chosen from Gozo, but also representatives in the Gozo Civic Council which, amongst other powers, has that of imposing special taxes on the Gozitans to be spent according to the wishes of the people of Gozo?

Results
Choice	Votes	%
Yes	137	76.97%
No	41	23.03%
Valid votes	178	91.28%
Invalid or blank votes	17	8.72%
Total votes	195	100.00%
Registered voters/turnout	15,621	1.25%

The Gozo Civil Council (Abolition) Referendum was held in Malta on 11 November 1973. The referendum was facultative and non-binding and only voters registered in Gozo were allowed to vote, and is to date the only non-national referendum to have been held in the country.

== Background ==
Gozo Civic Council had been set up as a statutory local government in the island of Gozo on 14 April 1961, the first experiment in civil local government in Malta since the French occupation of 1798–1800. The law authorised the council to raise taxes, although it never actually made use of this power.

In 1971 the Labour Party was voted into office. As its support in Gozo was weak and it favoured a more centralised administration it proposed a referendum on the abolishment of the Council putting emphasis on the unpopular possibility of it raising taxes.

== Question ==
Do you want Gozo to remain different from Malta, that is, not only having its own representatives in Parliament, chosen from Gozo, but also representatives in the Gozo Civic Council which, amongst other powers, has that of imposing special taxes on the Gozitans to be spent according to the wishes of the people of Gozo?

== Results ==
Choice	Votes	%
For	137	76.97
Against	41	23.03
Invalid/blank votes	17	–
Total	195	100
Registered voters/turnout	15,621	1.25
Source: Elections in Malta

== Outcome ==
Despite the exceptionally low turnout of just 1.25%, the Government proceeded with its plans to abolish the Gozo Civic Council. Government administration in Gozo was centralised in Valletta and Gozitan affairs became the direct responsibility of the Office of the Prime Minister.

In the mid-1980s attempts were made to set up a Gozo committee, chaired by the prime minister and with the Gozitan members of Parliament as members. However, it was only in 1987 that the Ministry of Gozo was set up (demoted to a Parliamentary Secretariat between 1996 and 1998). Local government in the Gozitan localities was restored with the introduction of local councils in 1993 with Gozo having 14 councils.

A Gozo Regional Committee was created by Act No. XVI of 2009 and was formally constituted in 2012.
