= Monte della Redenzione degli Schiavi =

Maltese charity for ransoming slaves

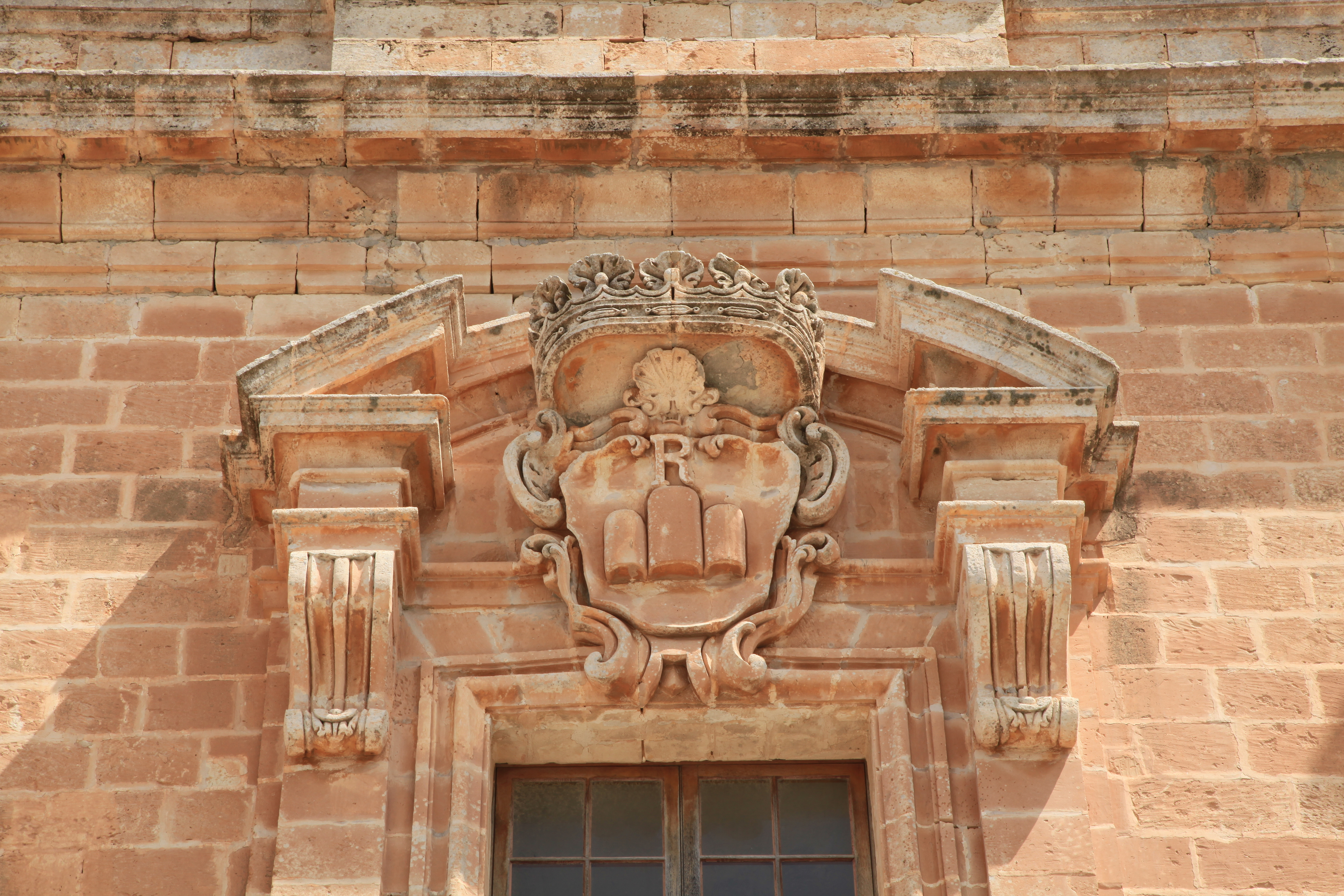
- Coat of arms of the Monte di Redenzione at Selmun Palace
- Merged into: Monte di Pietà e Redenzione
- Formation: 1607
- Founder: Alof de Wignacourt
- Dissolved: 28 June 1787 (as an independent institution); Early 19th century (ceased operations)
- Type: Social welfare service
- Legal status: Defunct
- Headquarters: Valletta, Malta

The Monte della Redenzione degli Schiavi, often simply known as the Monte di Redenzione, was a Maltese institution set up to finance the redemption of Maltese people enslaved by Ottomans or Barbary pirates. It was founded in 1607 by Grand Master Alof de Wignacourt and existed as an independent institution until 1787, when it was merged with the Monte di Pietà, forming the Monte di Pietà e Redenzione. The new institution continued the role of redeeming slaves until the early 19th century, when it became redundant following the suppression of slavery.

== History ==
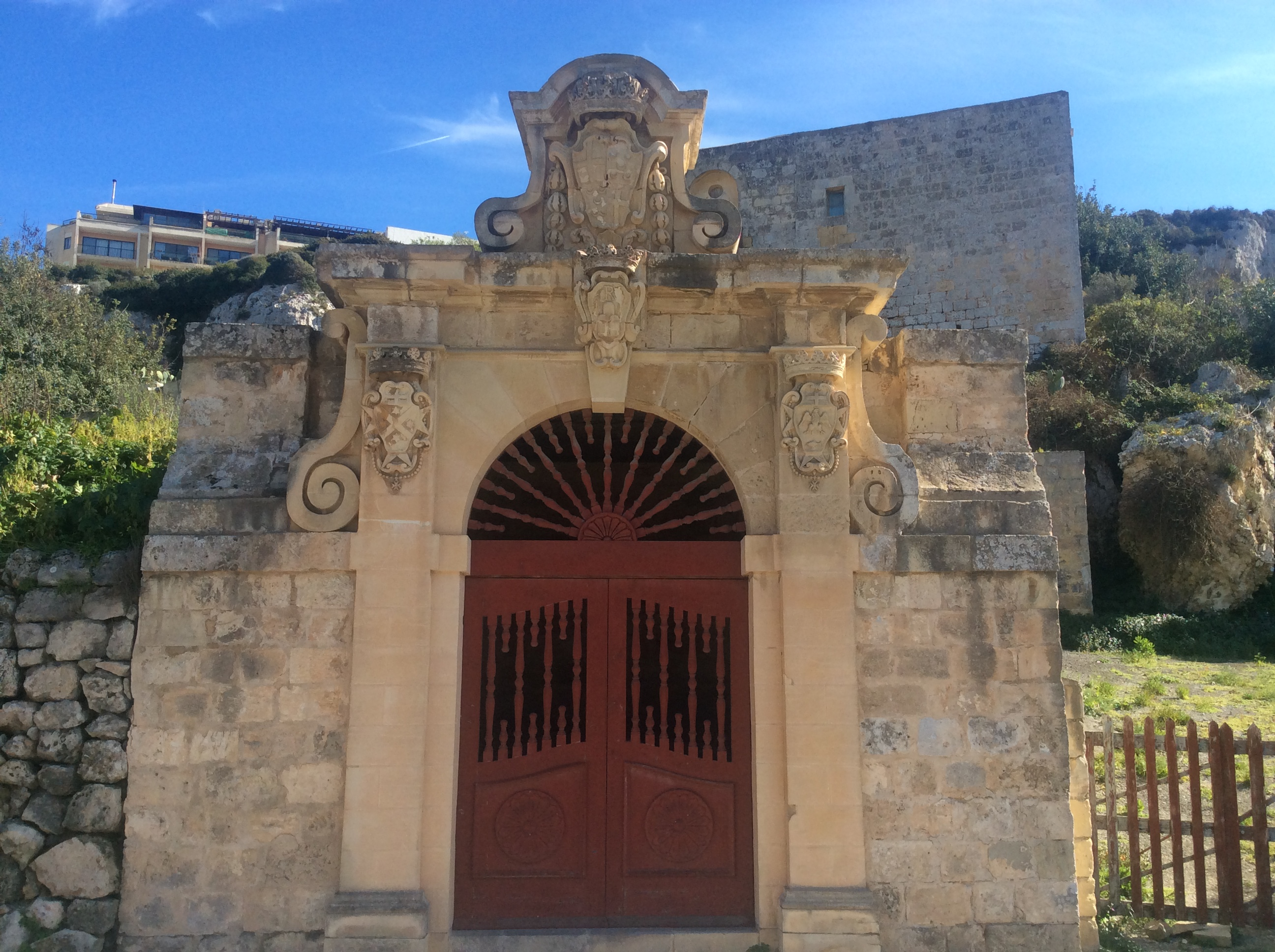
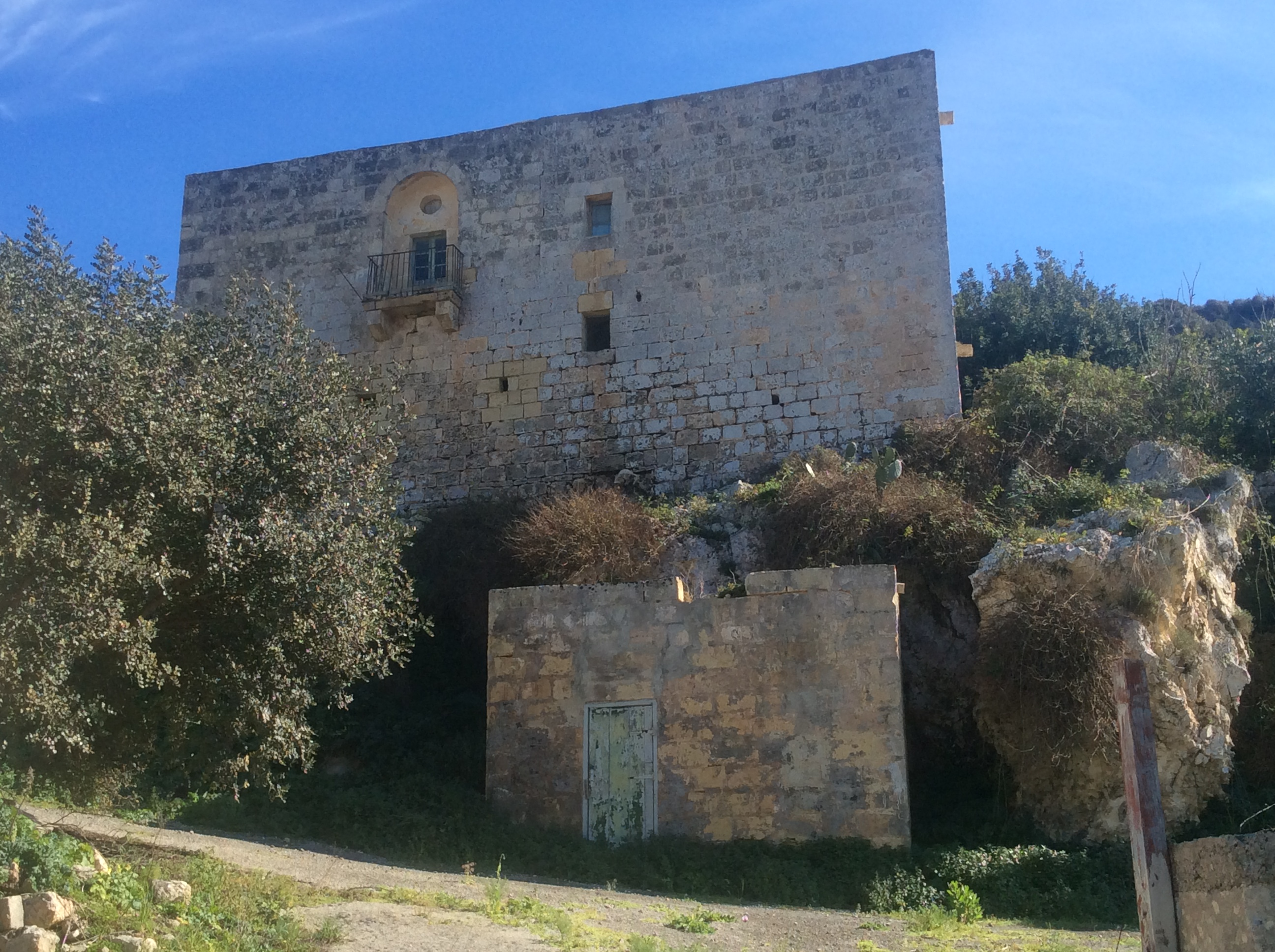

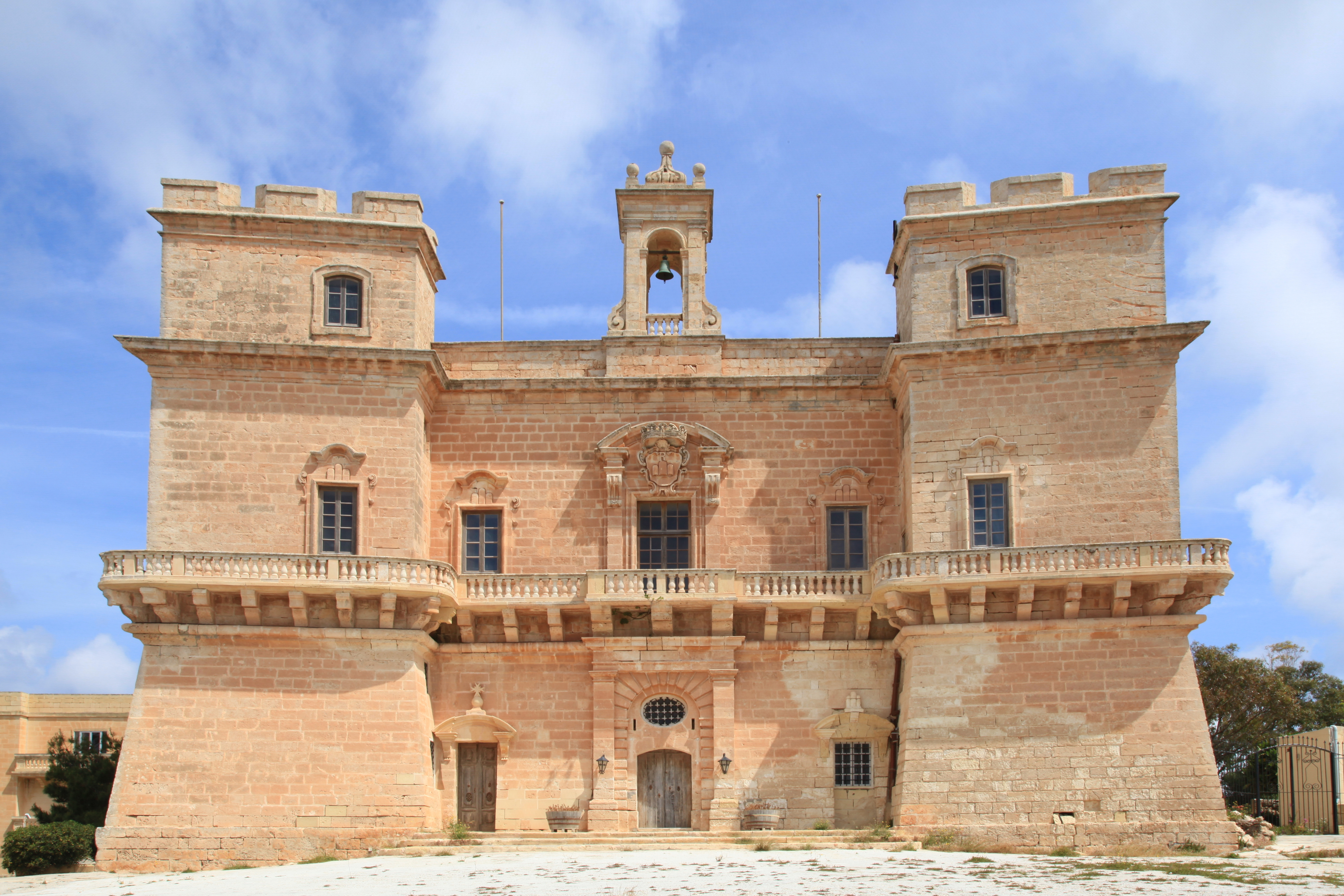
Mistra Gate (top), a farmhouse near the gate (middle) and Selmun Palace (bottom), all of which formed part of the Monte's estate in Selmun

The Monte della Redenzione degli Schiavi was founded in 1607 by Grand Master Alof de Wignacourt, after a Capuchin friar Raffaele Camilleri made a series of Lenten sermons describing the situation of Christian slaves in Muslim hands. For the first few years, the institution did not manage to collect enough funds. This changed when the noble Caterina Vitale bequeathed most of her estate to the Monte di Redenzione upon her death in 1619. Part of the property was sold, and with an additional 6,000 scudi donated by Gio. Domenico Felici, the institution was able to commence its operations.

Vitale's estate included a large area in Fego di Salamone, now known as Selmun. In the 18th century, the Mistra Gate and Selmun Palace were built within this estate. The palace was rented out to knights as a place to relax and hunt wild rabbits, and the rent money contributed to the redemption fund.

Initially, the Monte di Redenzione had a committee of seven members responsible for collecting alms, but this system was eventually abolished and replaced by an administration made up of four persons, two of whom were knights. From 1660, the Monte was run by a commission of three knights, headed by a Knight Grand Cross as president. This commission met at the vestry of the Conventual Church of St. John in Valletta until 1690, when they began to meet at the president's house.

The ransom paid for a Maltese slave was initially set at 70 scudi, but this later increased to 120 scudi. From 1707, the rate was fixed at no more than 150 scudi.

On 28 June 1787, Grand Master Emmanuel de Rohan-Polduc consolidated the funds of Monte di Pietà with those of the Monte di Redenzione, merging them into a single institution known as the Monte di Pietà e Redenzione. This was headed by a Knight Grand Cross as president and a commission of four knights and four Maltese people. At this point, the ransom paid for a Maltese slave increased to 500 scudi plus additional costs.

In 1798, during the French occupation of Malta, the funds of the Monte di Pietà e Redenzione were taken over by the state, and the estates which had belonged to the Monte di Redenzione became government property. The Monte was reopened by the British administration in 1800, but the role as Monte di Redenzione became redundant in the early 19th century, when slavery was suppressed. Eventually, the institution was renamed back to Monte di Pietà, and the funds allocated to the redemption of slaves were allocated to paying interests and loans. The Monte di Pietà still functions today.
