= Gozo Civic Council =

Legislative body in Gozo 1961–1973

Type
- Type: Unicameral legislature of Gozo

History
- Founded: 14 July 1961
- Disbanded: 4 December 1973; 51 years ago

Structure
- Seats: Up to 17 seats
- Appointed member political groups: Elected Members (14); Co-opted Members (Up to 3)
- Length of term: Three years
- Authority: Ordinance XI of 1961

Elections
- Appointed member voting system: Two stages; election of six members to each district committee, followed by election of one member by each district committee.
- Elected member voting system: First-past-the-post
- First Appointed member election: June 1961
- Last Appointed member election: June 1970

Meeting place
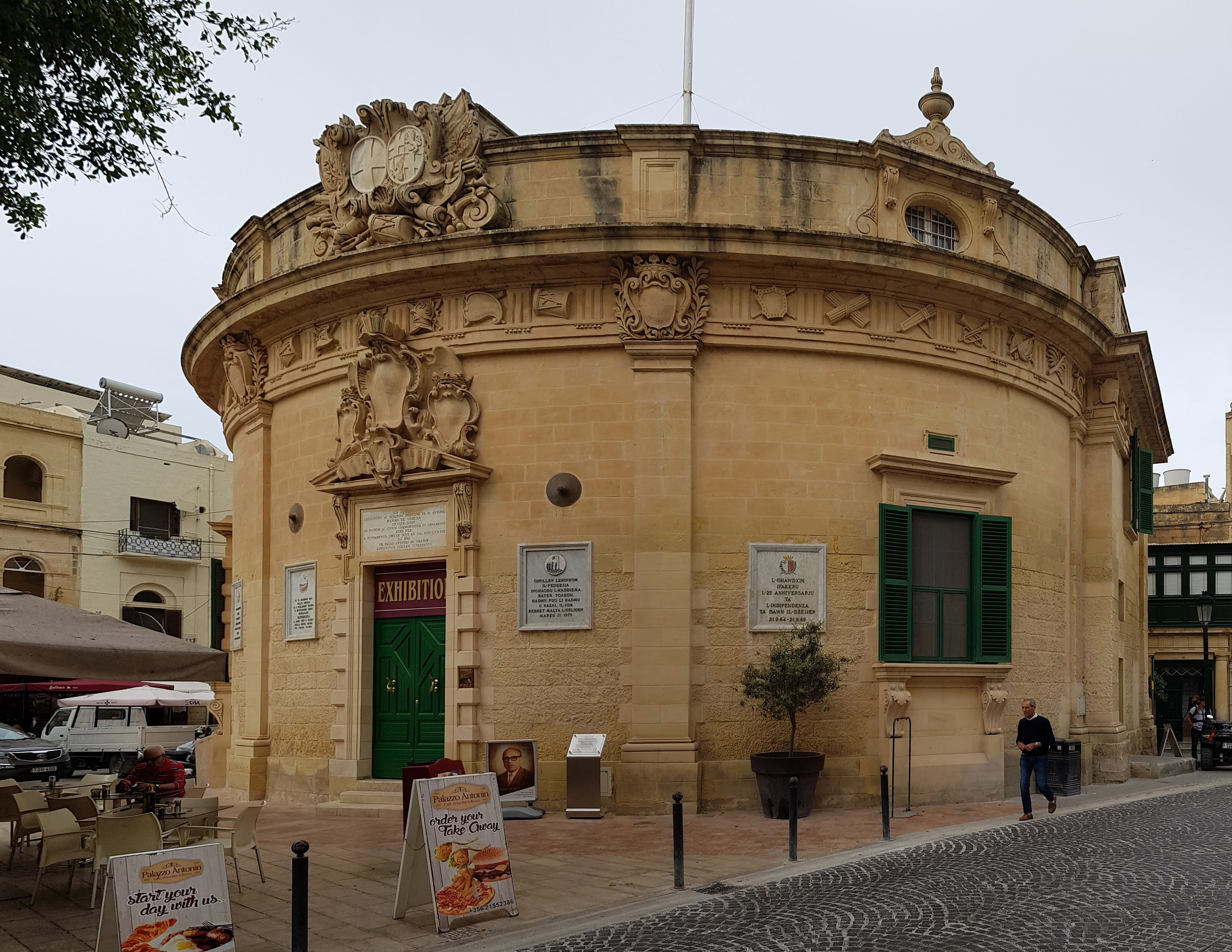
- Banca Giuratale, Victoria

Constitution
- Constitution of Malta

The Gozo Civic Council (Maltese: Il-Kunsill Ċiviku Għawdxi) was a short-lived statutory local government in the island of Gozo, Malta that was elected by the people of Gozo.

== Brief history ==
The Council met for the first time on 10 July 1961 and following the facultative non-binding 1973 Gozo Civic Council referendum and before the conclusion of the fourth legislature, it was dissolved by an Act of Parliament on 4 December 1973.

Elections were held every three years. The first election was held in June 1960, the second on 13 December 1964, the third in June 1967, with the last election taking place in June 1970.

== Composition and electoral system ==
The Gozo Civic Council was made up of fourteen councillors, one from each of the fourteen District Committees in Gozo, together with up to three other councillors that could be co-opted by the Council.

The elections of the Gozo Civic Council took a two-stepped approach. First, elections were held at a district level, with voters electing six members to sit on a district committee for each of the fourteen districts of Gozo, namely the regional capital of Victoria and the villages of Il-Fontana, Għajnsielem, L-Għarb, L-Għasri, Ta' Kerċem, Il-Munxar, In-Nadur, Il-Qala, San Lawrenz, Ta' Sannat, Ix-Xagħra, Ix-Xewkija and Iż-Żebbuġ.

Thereafter, one of the councillors elected by the voters in the aforementioned election was to be elected to represent the district by each district committee.

== Meeting place ==
The Council used to convene at the Banca Giuratale in Victoria.

== Sub-committees ==
Besides the fourteen District Committees, the Council also created a number of Sub-Committees dealing with a specific sector. These were as follows:

- Finance Committee (since inception)
- Road Committee (since inception)
- Health Committee (since inception)
- General Purposes Committee (since inception)
- Street Naming Committee (since second legislature)

Occasionally, the Council also established other ad-hoc sub-committees of a temporary nature that were dedicated to certain events, such as that the sub-committee formed in 1963 that was tasked with the anti-pest campaign that the Council intended to embark on.
