= Domenico Cachia =

Maltese architect (c. 1690–1761)

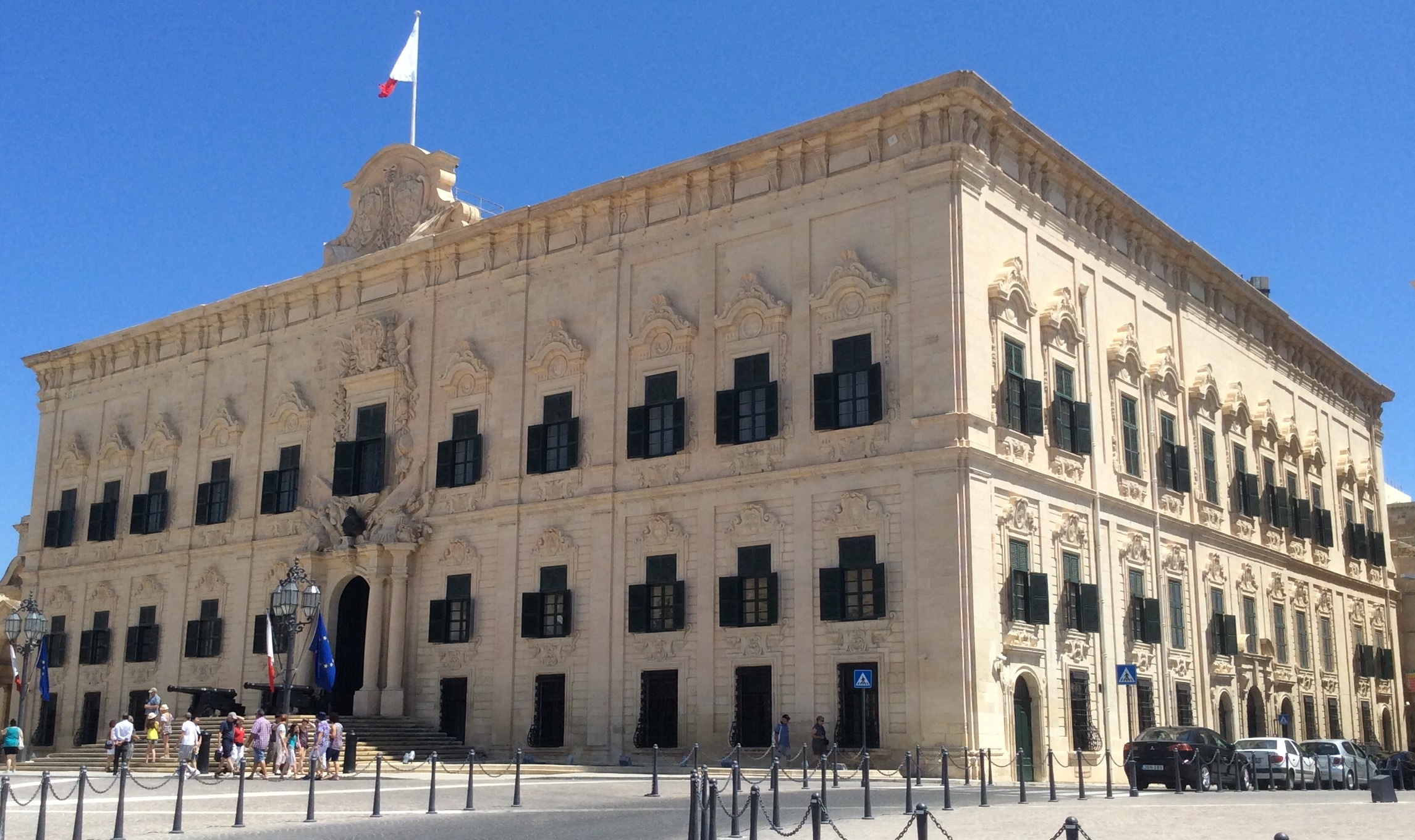
Auberge de Castille, whose construction was overseen by Cachia

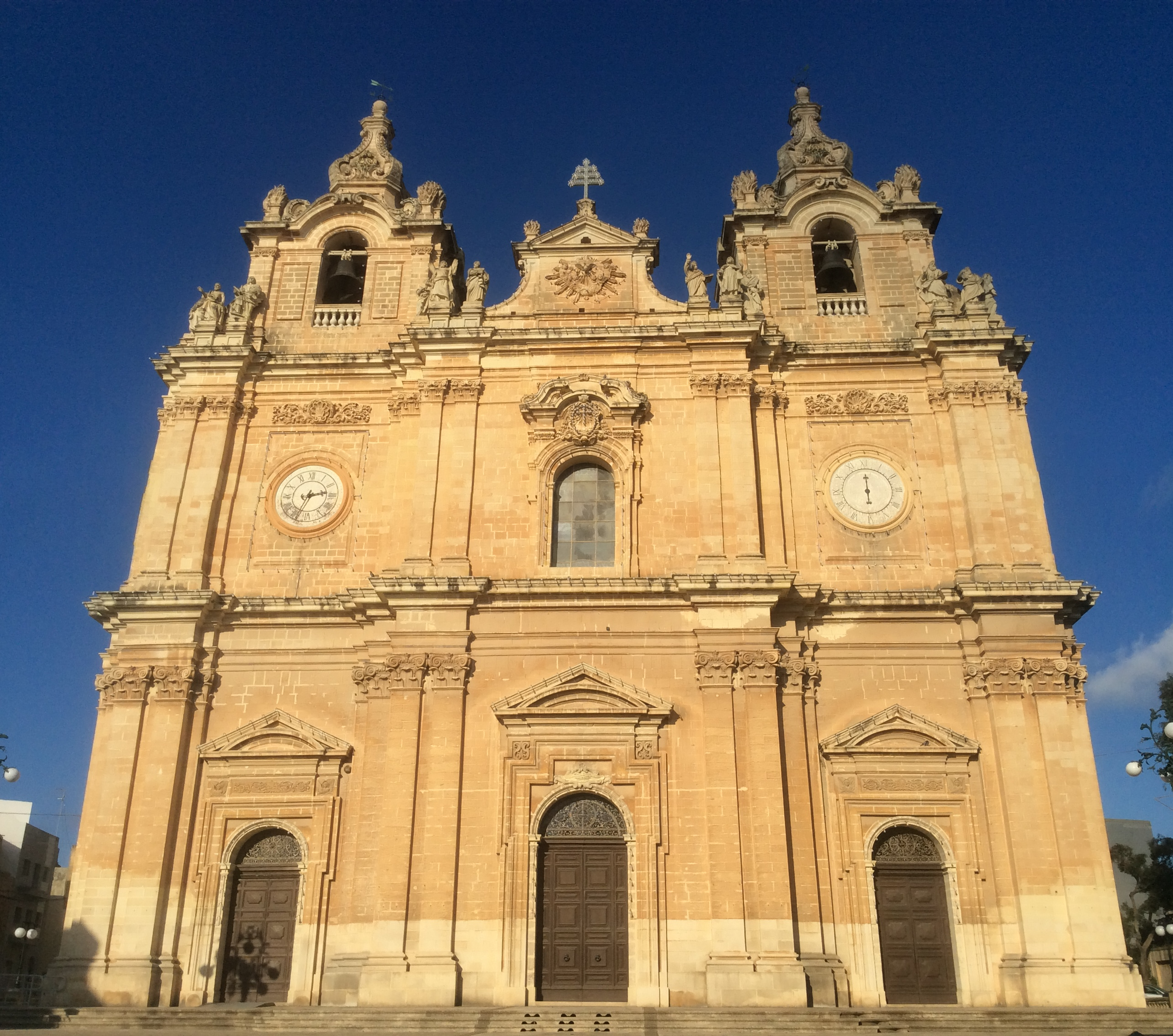
St Helen's Basilica, which is attributed to Cachia

Domenico Cachia (Maltese: Duminku Cachia, c. 1690–1761) was a Maltese capomastro (master builder) who was involved in the construction of several notable buildings, including Auberge de Castille in Valletta and St Helen's Basilica in Birkirkara. It is not certain if he was the same person as Gio Domenico Cachia, an architect who was the father of Antonio Cachia.

Domenico Cachia was involved in the dismantling of Girolamo Cassar's original Auberge de Castille in 1741, and subsequently the construction of a new auberge to designs of Andrea Belli. He was a capomastro of the Manoel Foundation from 1745 to 1761.

Cachia is sometimes also attributed with the designs of St Helen's Basilica in Birkirkara (1740), the Selmun Palace in Mellieħa (date unknown) and the Church of St. Augustine in Valletta (1765–94), but there is no documentary evidence of his involvement.

He was from Żejtun.
