= Monte di Pietà (Malta) =

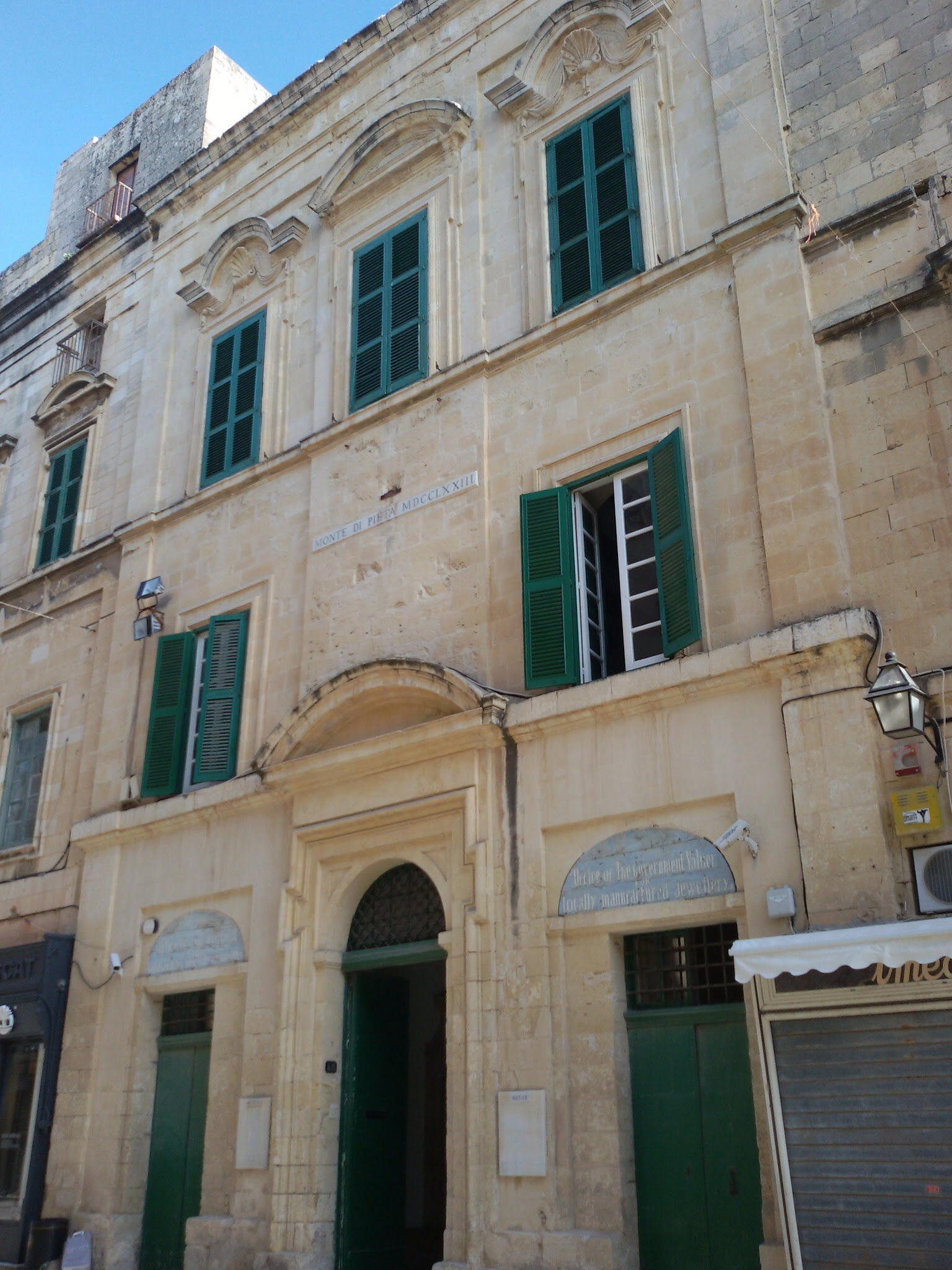
- Façade of the Monte di Pietà
- Interactive map of the Monte di Pietà area

General information
- Status: Intact
- Type: Edifice
- Architectural style: Baroque
- Location: Valletta, Malta, 46, Monte di Pietà Buildings, Merchant's Street
- Coordinates: 35°53′51.4″N 14°30′49″E
- Current tenants: Inland Revenue Department
- Completed: c. 1577
- Renovated: Mid-17th century 1773
- Owner: Government of Malta

Technical details
- Material: Limestone
- Floor count: 3

Design and construction
- Architects: Francesco Buonamici (façade only, attributed)

The Monte di Pietà, formerly known as the Monte di Sant'Anna, is a charitable institution in Valletta, Malta which lends money to those in need at modest interest rates, on the security of gold, silver or other precious articles given in pawn. It is a mount of piety, a type of Catholic institution for lending money exempt from the historic Catholic ban on usury. The institution was set up in 1598, was known in the British period as the Public Pawn-Brokery, and is still in operation today as part of the Inland Revenue Department. Since 1773, the Monte di Pietà has been housed in a 16th-century building in Valletta.

== The institution ==
The Monte di Pietà was founded on 15 January 1598 under the name Monte di Sant'Anna, when the Portuguese knight Fra Manuel de Couros obtained permission from the Grand Master of the Order of Malta, Martin Garzez to donate 2000 scudi so as to set up a fund to suppress usury, which was reportedly practiced by slaves and Jewish people. When it was first set up, the interest was two grani per scudo, and pawned valuables would be sold by auction after one year if the owner failed to pay back the money including the interest. From 1598, the institution was housed in part of the Banca Giuratale, but it later moved to the Castellania. It moved to its present premises in 1773.

In 1699, Grand Master Ramon Perellos y Roccaful assigned a total of 5372 scudi to the Monte. Part of this generous amount is attributed to a find during the project for the construction of Mdina Cathedral. During a demolition of a house now addressed at 1 St Paul Square, to make way for the Cathedral, construction workers had found gold coins in a medieval urn that date back to the Arab period. They were recognised through an Islamic creeds on a side of the coins, while on the other side the coins had three pears each similar to Perellos' coat-of-arms. Perellos claimed them as his, because of the similarity to the pears, but the bishop took the case to the papacy. Pope Innocent XII concluded that the Bishop had right over half of the findings, due to being found on the church's property, while the other half can be used generously for the Monte di Pietà.

The funds of the institution were increased throughout the 18th century, including by the sale of tenements donated by Giuseppe Scipione Camilleri in 1712, and the transfer of funds from the Università and the Castellania to the Monte in 1720–1721 and 1724 respectively.

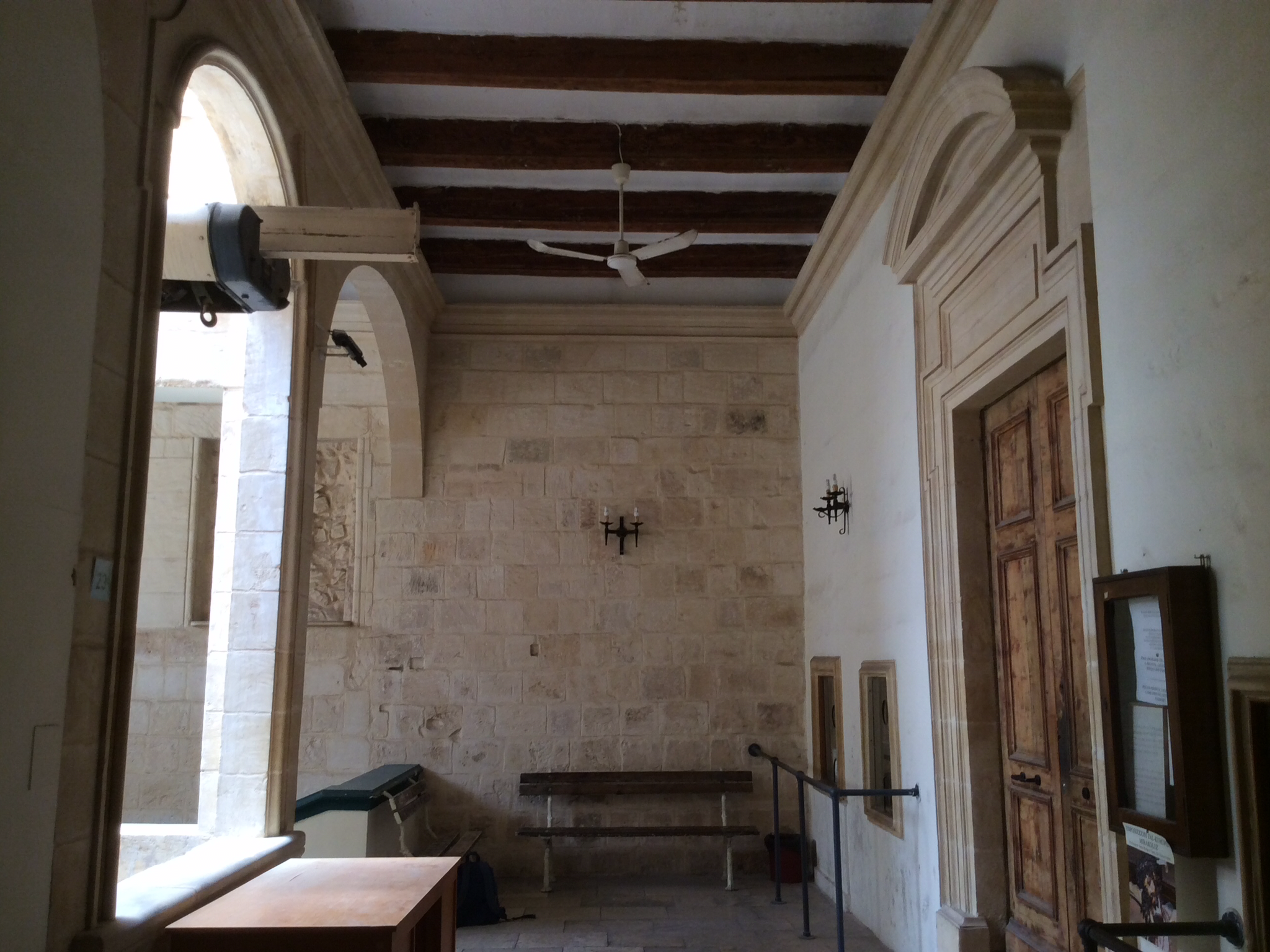
Main hall for clients, at second floor

On 28 June 1787, Grand Master Emmanuel de Rohan-Polduc consolidated the funds of the Monte di Pietà with those of the Monte della Redenzione degli Schiavi, an institution which had been set up by Alof de Wignacourt in 1607 in order to redeem Christian slaves in Muslim territories. The two institutions therefore became merged as the Monte di Pietà e Redenzione. This name lasted until the early 19th century, when the institution was renamed back to Monte di Pietà following the suppression of slavery.

The Monte di Pietà continued to operate during the French occupation of Malta in 1798, but its pawns and funds were taken over by the French government with the beginning of the Maltese uprising. Following the end of the blockade, during the British protectorate, the institution was reopened by Civil Commissioner Alexander Ball on 10 October 1800. During the British colonisation it served as the office of the giurati and later served as the Grain Department.

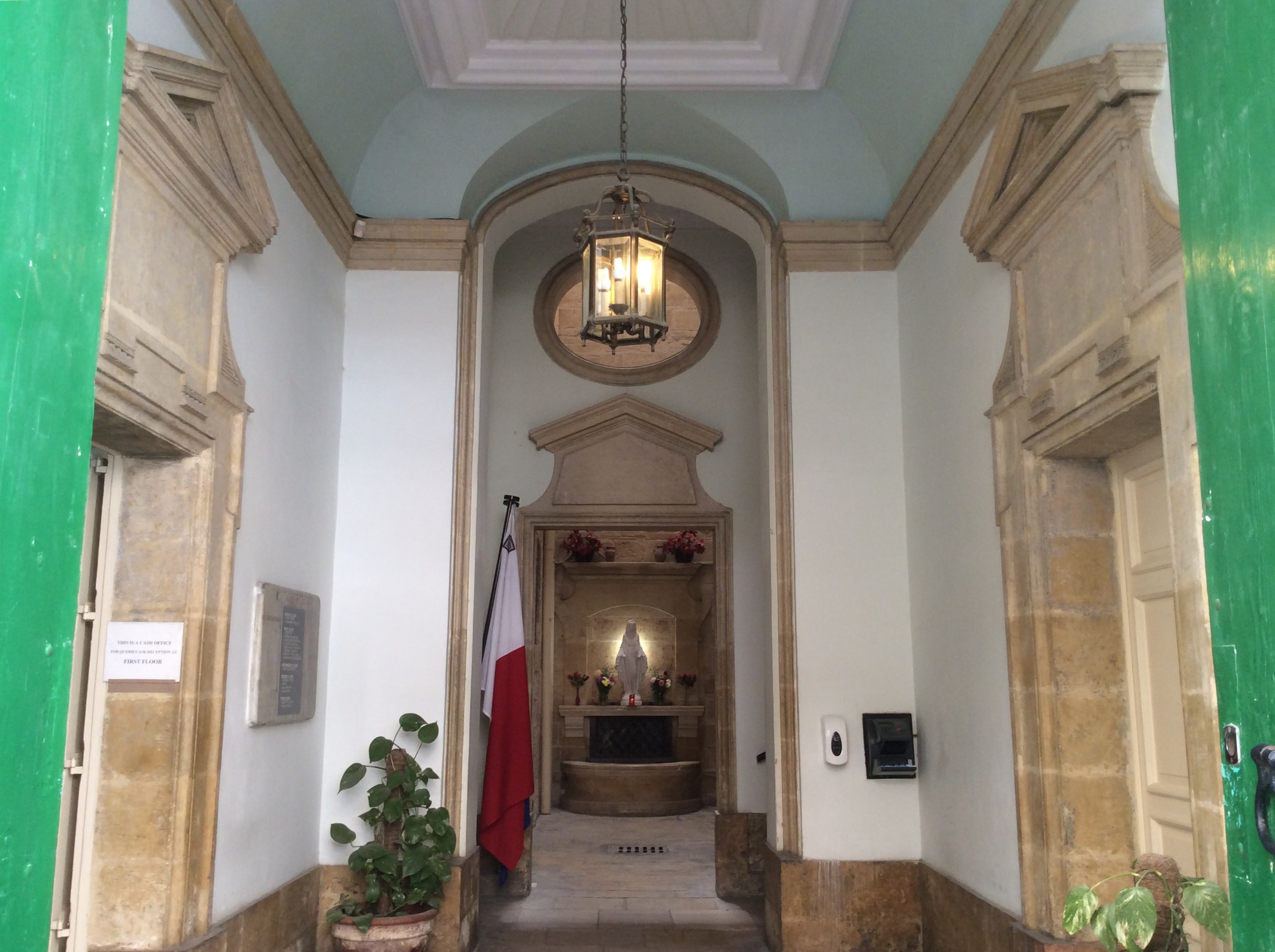
Entrance hall

On 1 April 1977, the funds of the Monte di Pietà were transferred to the Maltese government. Since then, the institution has formed part of the Inland Revenue Department, falling under the responsibility of the Ministry of Finance. Anyone aged over 18 can deposit precious goods at the institution in exchange for cash. The interest rate is 5%, and it is payable within three years.

The Monte di Pietà went into decline from 2010 to 2015 since its government-established rates were no longer competitive when compared to the prices paid by jewelry stores, due to the increase in gold prices. However, by January 2016 the value of pawned items had gone up to the highest in the past decade.

== The building ==
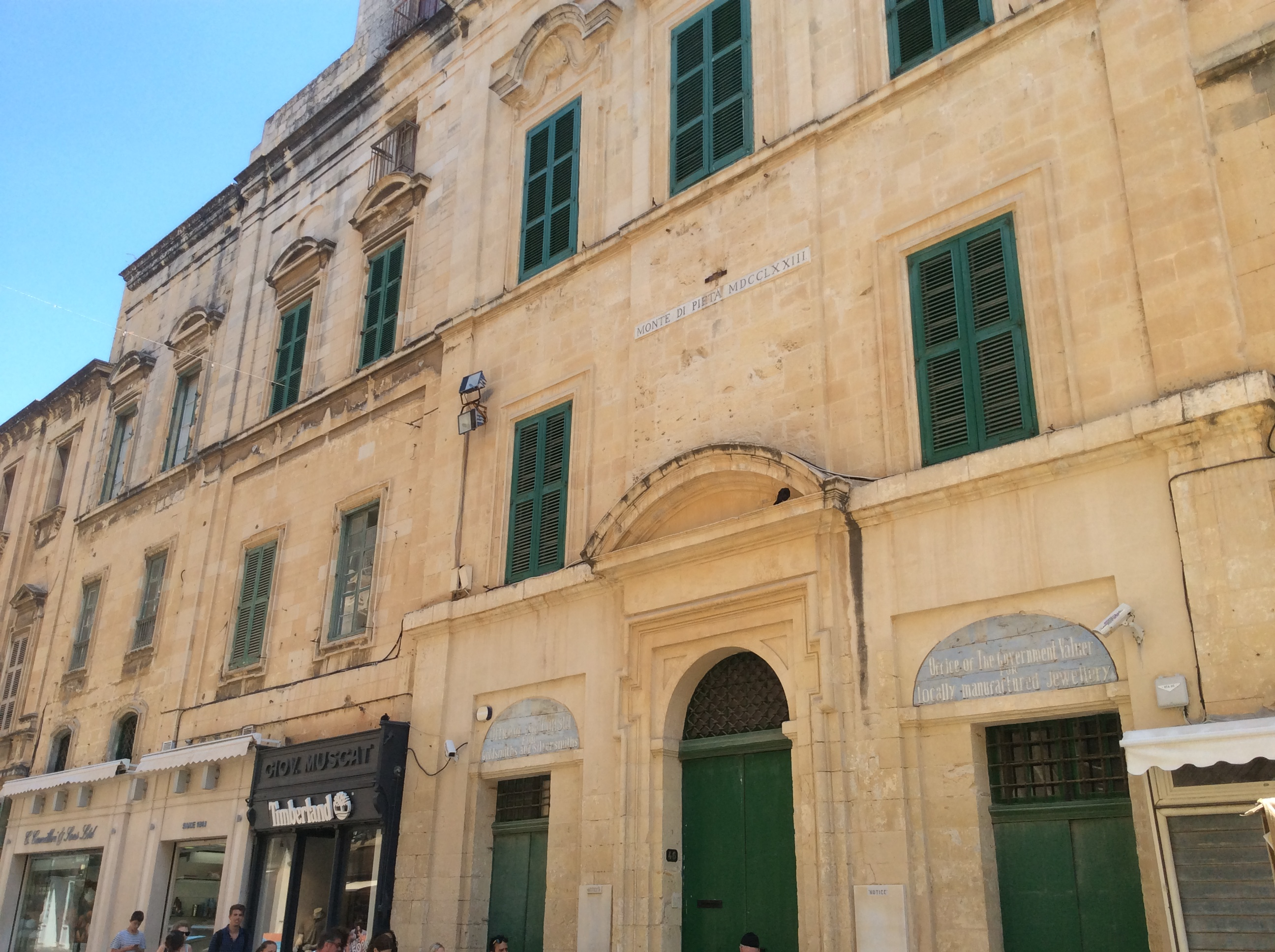
Monte di Sant' Anna (right) with later joined houses Casa Galea (middle) and Nunnery of St Ursula (left), together became known as the Monte di Pietà Buildings

The Monte di Pietà is housed in a 16th-century building located at No. 46, Merchants Street. Its façade was rebuilt in the Baroque style in the mid-17th century, possibly by the architect Francesco Buonamici. The building is three stories high, and its main entrance is decorated with a moulded cornice, and it is topped by a pediment. The main entrance is flanked by two side entrances. Two windows are located at the first floor, while the top floor contains three windows.

The building originally served as the Banca Giuratale, the seat of the Università of Valletta, from 1577 to 1721. On 30 July 1721, it was acquired by the Treasury of the Order of St. John, in exchange for a house located across the street which became the new Banca Giuratale. From then on, the Treasury used the building as an office for selling the spogli of dead knights of the Order.

On 14 August 1749, Grand Master Manuel Pinto da Fonseca gave the building to Giuseppe Cohen, a Jew who had revealed the Conspiracy of the Slaves. It remained in the Cohen family until 1773, when they were given an annuity and the building was taken over to house the Monte di Pietà. At this point, the building was remodelled to its present state.

In 2007 and 2008, the building suffered some structural damage due to excavation work at a nearby site.

The building is scheduled as a Grade 1 national monument by the Malta Environment and Planning Authority.
