= French occupation of Malta =

1798–1800 military occupation

Malta Malte (French)
- 1798–1800
- Flag
- Motto: Liberté, Égalité, Fraternité; Liberty, Equality, Fraternity
- Anthem: "La Marseillaise"
- French-language map of Malta and Gozo, c. 1798
- Status: Military occupation
- Capital: Valletta
- Common languages: Official languages: French; Italian; Majority language: Maltese
- Religion: Roman Catholicism
- Demonyms: (MT) Malti, (EN) Maltese

Government
  - Military Governor: Claude-Henri Belgrand de Vaubois
- Legislature: Commission of Government
- Historical era: French Revolutionary Wars
  - French invasion: 9 June 1798
  - Established: 11 June 1798
  - Maltese rebellion: 2 September 1798
  - Surrendered to the British: 4 September 1800
- Currency: Maltese scudo
Preceded by	Succeeded by
Hospitaller Malta	Malta Protectorate; Gozitan Nation
- Today part of: Malta

The island of Malta was occupied by France from 1798 to 1800. The Knights Hospitaller surrendered to Napoleon Bonaparte following the French landing in June 1798. In Malta, the French established a constitutional tradition in Maltese history (as part of the French First Republic), granted free education for all, and theoretically established freedom of the press, although only the pro-French newspaper Journal de Malte was actually published during the occupation.

The French abolished nobility, slavery, the feudal system, and the inquisition. The only remaining architectural reminder of the French occupation is probably the defacement of most coats of arms on the façades of buildings of the knights. The Maltese soon rebelled against the French and drove the French garrison into Valletta and the Grand Harbour fortifications where they were besieged for more than two years. The French surrendered Malta when their food supplies were about to run out.

== French invasion of Malta ==
On 19 May 1798, a French fleet sailed from Toulon, escorting an expeditionary force of over 30,000 men under General Napoleon Bonaparte. The force was destined for Egypt, Bonaparte seeking to expand French influence in Asia and force Britain to make peace in the French Revolutionary Wars, which had begun in 1792. Sailing southeast, the convoy collected additional transports from Italian ports and at 05:30 on 9 June arrived off Valletta. At this time, Malta and its neighbouring islands were ruled by the Order of Saint John, an old and influential feudal order that Holy Roman Empire's Frederick Barbarossa had pledged his protection to. The Order was weakened by the loss of most of their revenue during the French Revolution. Nevertheless Grandmaster Ferdinand von Hompesch zu Bolheim, refused Bonaparte's demand that his entire convoy be allowed to enter Grand Harbour and take on supplies, insisting that Malta's neutrality meant that only two ships could enter at a time.

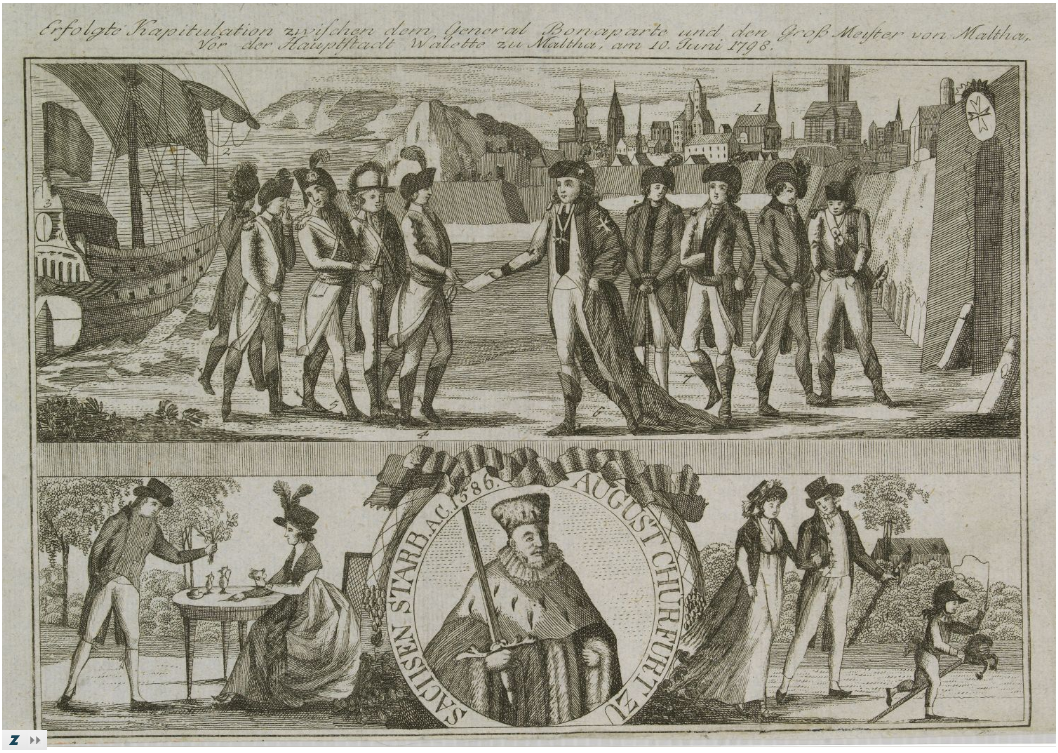
Capitulation of Malta to general Bonaparte

On receiving this reply, Bonaparte immediately ordered his fleet to bombard Valletta and, on 11 June, General Louis Baraguey d'Hilliers directed an amphibious operation in which several thousand soldiers landed at seven strategic sites around the island. Many of the French Knights deserted the order (although some fought for it valiantly), and the remaining Knights failed to mount a meaningful resistance. Approximately 2,000 native Maltese militia resisted for 24 hours, retreating to Valletta once the city of Mdina fell to General Claude-Henri Belgrand de Vaubois. Although Valletta was strong enough to hold out against a lengthy siege, Bonaparte negotiated a surrender with Hompesch, who agreed to turn Malta and all of its resources over to the French in exchange for estates and pensions in France for himself and his knights. Bonaparte then established a French garrison on the islands, leaving 4,000 men under Vaubois while he and the rest of the expeditionary force sailed eastwards for Alexandria on 19 June.

== Reforms ==
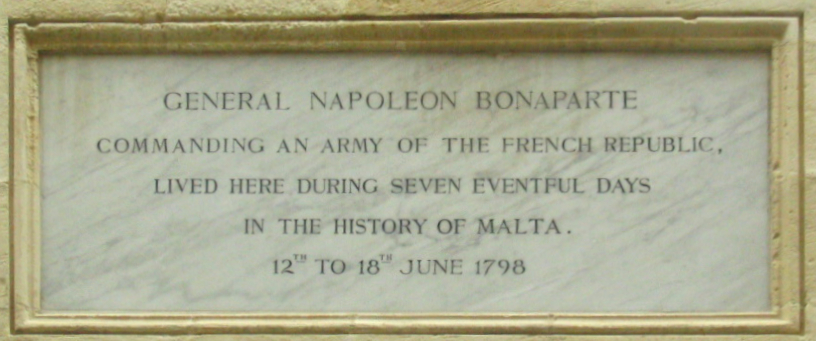
Plaque on Palazzo Parisio referencing Napoleon's stay there.

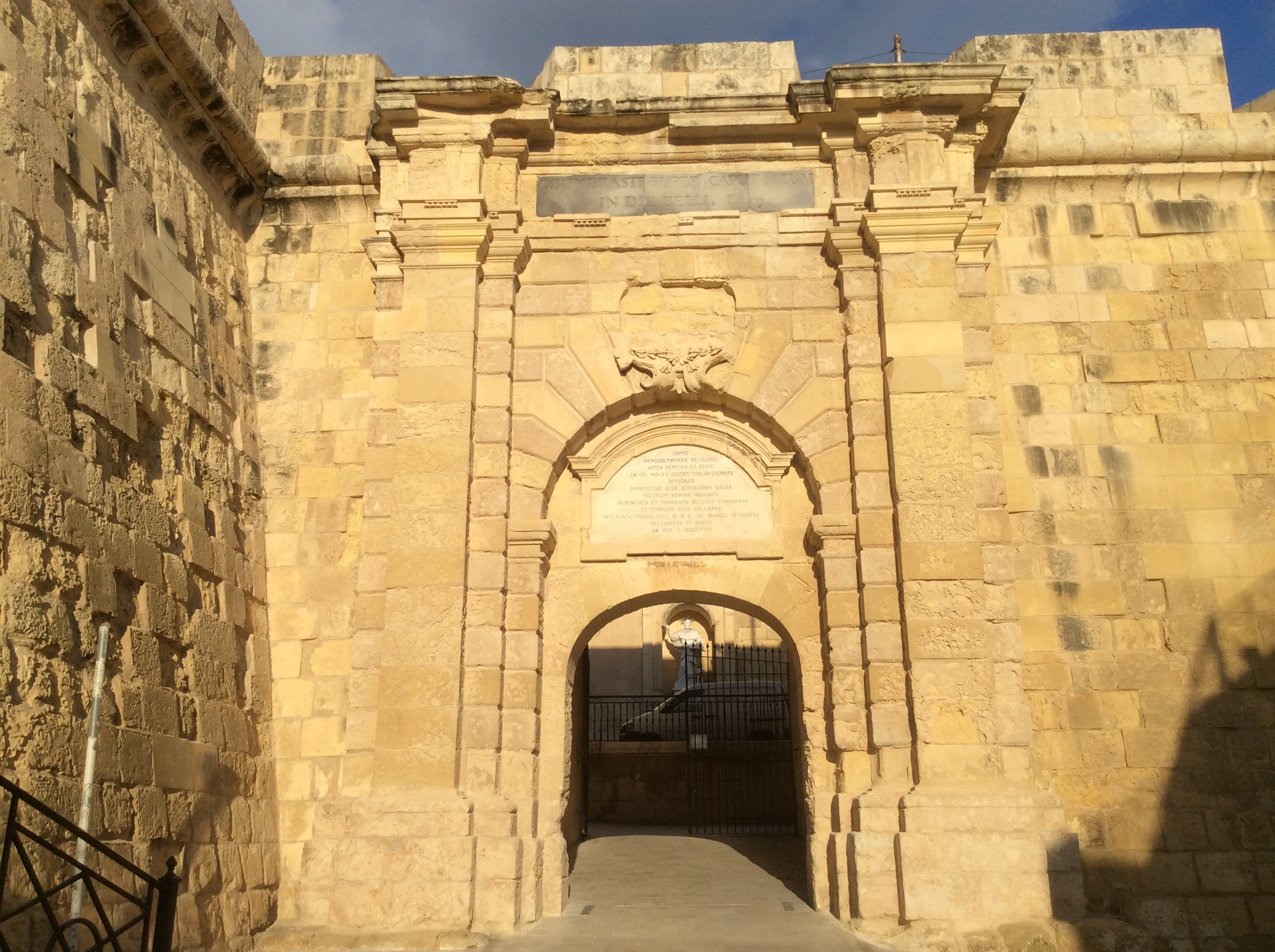
The Main Gate of Birgu, which had its coats of arms defaced during the French occupation

During Napoleon's short stay in Malta, he stayed in Palazzo Parisio in Valletta (currently used as the Ministry for Foreign Affairs). He implemented a number of reforms which were based on the principles of the French Revolution. These reforms could be divided into four main categories:

=== Social ===
The people of Malta were granted equality before the law, and they were regarded as French citizens. The Maltese nobility was abolished, and slaves were freed. Napoleon decided to set up a government ruled by 5 Maltese people that would govern Malta. Freedom of speech and the press were granted, although the only newspaper was Journal de Malte, which was published by the government. Political prisoners including Mikiel Anton Vassalli and those who took part in the Rising of the Priests were released, while the Jewish population was given permission to build a synagogue.

=== Administrative ===
All of the Order's property was surrendered to the French Government. A Commission of Government was set up to rule the islands, and it was made up of the following people:

Office	Officeholder
Commission de gouvernement
Military Governor	Claude-Henri Belgrand de Vaubois
Commissioner	Michel-Louis-Étienne Regnaud
President of the Civil Commission	Jean de Bosredon de Ransijat
Secretary to the Commissioner	Coretterie
Member	Don Francesco Saverio Caruana (Canon of the Mdina Cathedral)
Member	Baron Jean-François Dorell (juror of the university)
Member	Dr. Vincenzo Caruana (secretary of the archbishop and president of the court)
Member	Cristoforo Frendo (notary)
Member	Benedetto Schembri (magistrate)
Member	Paolo Ciantar (merchant)
Member	Carlo Astor
Commission des domaines
Member	Martthieu Poussielgue
Member	Jean-André Caruson
Member	Robert Roussel

Moreover, Malta was divided into cantons and municipalities. Each was run by a president, secretary and four members:

Malta

Office	Officeholder
Canton of Malta - Western Municipality (Valletta and Floriana)
Secretary	Aimable Vella
Member	Etienne Libreri
Member	Nicolas Effner
Member	Camille Sceberras
Member	Philippe Torriggiani
Member	Xavier Portoghese
Canton of Malta - Eastern Municipality (Birgu, Senglea and Cospicua)
Secretary	Francois Roux
Member	Joseph Maurin
Member	Marc’Antoine Muscat
Member	Jean Dalli
Member	Gaetano Bertis
Member	Gaetano Pisani
Canton of Mdina, Rabat and Dingli
President	Grégorio Bonici
Secretary	Gaetano Vitale (notary)
Member	Saverio Bernard (doctor)
Member	Joseph Bonnici (lawyer)
Member	Paul Scriberras (farmer)
Member	Antonio Gionanni Pietro Vitale
Canton of Żebbuġ
President	Stanislao L'Hoste
Secretary	Joseph Brignone (notary)
Member	Francesco Azzopardi (farmer)
Member	Gaetano Fournier (farmer)
Member	Luigi Briffa (farmer)
Member	Saverio Bonanno
Canton of Qormi and Luqa
President	Stanislao Gatt (pharmacist)
Secretary	Joseph Casha
Member	Luigi Saverio Grech (notary, secretary for Luqa)
Member	Emmanuele Micalef (doctor)
Member	Alberto Camilleri (farmer)
Member	Horace Ellul (farmer)
Canton of Naxxar, Mosta and Għargħur
President	Andrea Micallef (notary)
Secretary	Giovanni Maria Borg (lawyer)
Member	Francesco Falzon (doctor)
Member	Luigi Bezzina (lawyer)
Member	Giovanni Gafa (lawyer)
Member	Tommaso Chetcuti (lawyer)
Canton of Birkirkara, Lija, Balzan and Attard
President	Luigi Caruana (notary)
Secretary	Francesco Saverio Zarb (notary)
Member	Joseph Attard (priest)
Member	Gregorio Gatt (farmer)
Member	Pietro Cammenzuli (farmer)
Member	Angelo Grech (farmer)
Canton of Siġġiewi, Qrendi and Mqabba
President	Michelangelo Azzopardi (doctor)
Secretary	Francesco Farrugia
Member	Carmelo Saliba (farmer)
Member	Simone Spiteri (farmer)
Member	Giuseppe Magro (farmer)
Member	Nicolas Camilleri
Canton of Żejtun, Żabbar, Għaxaq and Tarxien
President	Paolo Mallia (doctor)
Secretary	Gregorio Mifsud (notary)
Member	Alessandro Zammit (doctor)
Member	Antonio Busuttil (farmer)
Member	Angelo Castagna (farmer)
Member	Giuseppe Montebello (farmer)
Canton of Żurrieq, Safi, Kirkop and Gudja
President	Gaetano Sajdon (doctor)
Secretary	Giovanni Battista Sajdon
Member	Gaetano Dalli (farmer)
Member	Alessandro Damato (farmer)
Member	Giovanni Cassar (farmer)
Member	Filippo Castagna (farmer)

Gozo
French Commander: Jean Louis Ebénézer Reynier

Office	Officeholder
Municipality of the City of Gozo (Rabat, Għarb, Sannat and Xewkija)
President	Saverio Cassar (archpriest)
Secretary	Giovanni Cassar
Member	Saverio Busuttil
Member	Giuseppe Bondi
Member	Francesco Pace
Member	Saverio Pace
Municipality of Caccia (Xagħra, Żebbuġ and Nadur)
President	Vincenzo Cauchi (priest)
Secretary	Benigno Cutajar
Member	Fortunato Grech (priest)
Member	Bartolomeo Busuttil
Member	Giovanni Maria Sapiano
Member	Francesco Attard

A National Guard was also set up, with 900 men.

=== Educational ===
Primary schools were to be set up in the main towns and villages, while 60 students were to be allowed to study in France. The University of Malta was to be renamed Polytecnique, and scientific subjects were to be taught there. However, none of these reforms were actually implemented due to the short duration of French rule.

=== Church-State relations ===
The church's extensive property on Malta was taken over by the Government, and religious orders were only allowed to keep one convent each. The Inquisition was also abolished, and the last inquisitor was expelled from the islands.

Later on, French troops began to loot church property, and this was one of the main reasons for the Maltese uprising.

== Maltese uprising ==
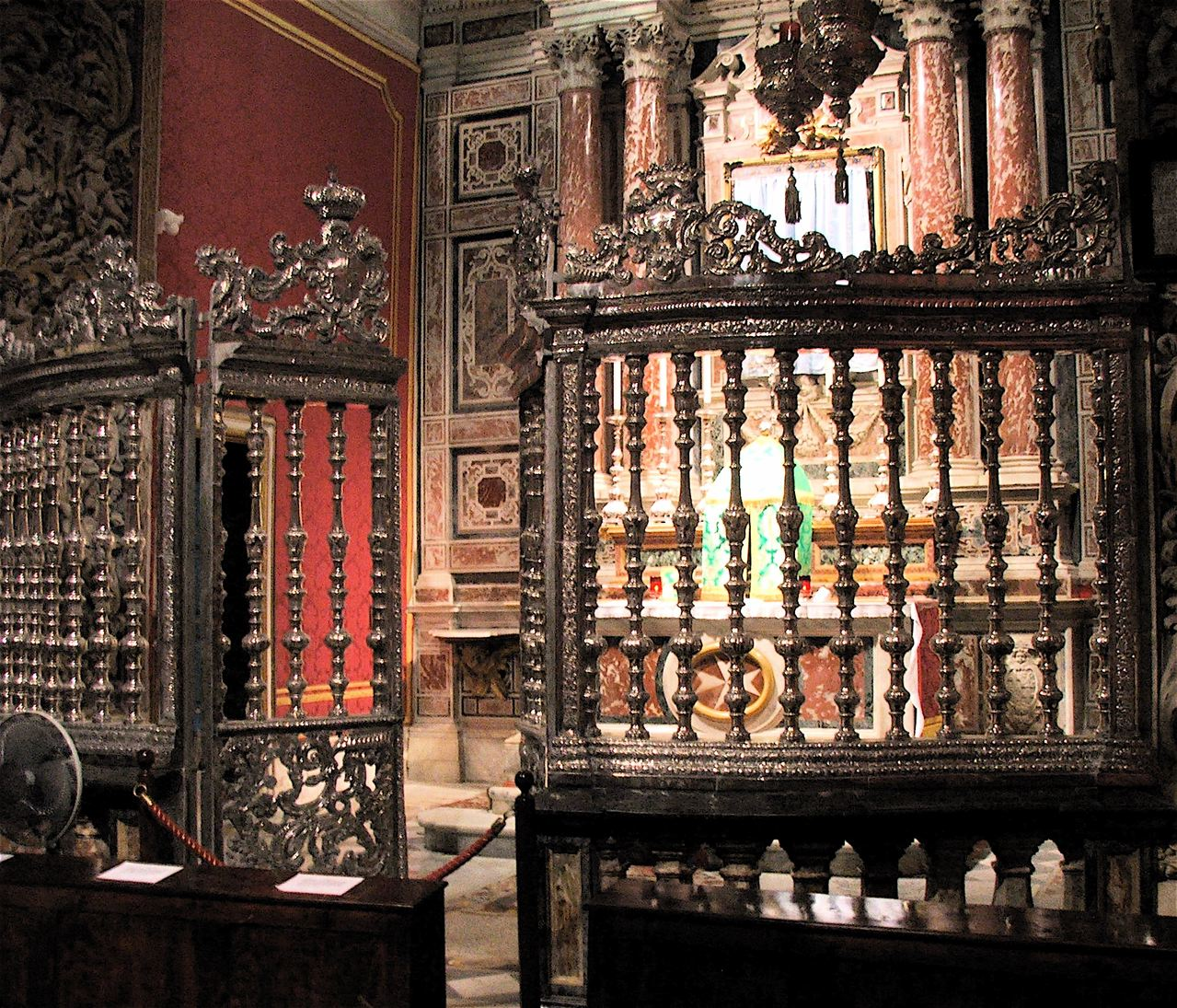
The silver gate in St. John's Co-Cathedral was painted black by the Maltese so that the French troops would not realize that it was made of silver and melt it down into bullion.

The French rapidly dismantled the institutions of the Knights of St. John, including the Roman Catholic Church, and the Maltese people were not happy about this. There were economic problems and the French government did not pay wages or pensions anymore, and began taking gold and silver from banks and palaces of the Order.

Church property was looted and seized to pay for the expedition to Egypt, an act that generated considerable anger among the deeply religious Maltese population. On 2 September, this anger erupted in a popular uprising during an auction of church property, and within days thousands of Maltese irregulars had driven the French garrison into Valletta and the Harbour area. Valletta was surrounded by approximately 10,000 irregular Maltese soldiers led by Emmanuele Vitale and Canon Francesco Saverio Caruana, but the fortress was too strong for the irregulars to assault. The Maltese built siege fortifications surrounding the harbour area to bombard French positions.

Help from Britain arrived later in the year and, in 1799, Captain Alexander Ball was appointed Civil Commissioner of Malta. The French garrison in Valletta finally surrendered to the British on 5 September 1800, and were taken to Toulon aboard British ships, with Malta becoming a British protectorate.

=== Gozo ===
On 28 October 1798, Ball successfully completed negotiations with the French garrison on the small island of Gozo, the 217 French soldiers there agreeing to surrender without a fight and transferring the island to the British. The British transferred the island to the locals that day, and it was administered by Archpriest Saverio Cassar where they made themselves a sovereign state of the kingdom of the two Sicilies and under the rule of Ferdinand III of Sicily. Gozo remained a sovereign state until Cassar was removed from power by the British in 1801.

== Economic Impact ==
The Massa Frumentaria, was a grain fund responsible for the importation of wheat and foodstuffs administered by the Università, under the supervision of the Knights of St. John. The Università was a form of local government composed of local aristocracy responsible for managing the island’s civil and economic affairs during medieval times. The Massa Frumentaria operated as a very profitable commercial venture financed by citizens who deposited money into it and who, in return, earned interest rates between 3% and 6%.

During Napoleon's occupation of Malta, the French depleted the Massa Frumentaria taking 1,203,660 scudi. During the subsequent Maltese uprising, in a letter dated 9 May 1799, General Vaubois, general of the French garrison, threatened the Maltese insurgents with financial ruin if the French lost control of Malta. After the French capitulated on September 5, 1800, General Pigot, leader of the British relief forces, eager to occupy Valletta, neglected to secure the financial interests of the Maltese. Following British occupation, Governor Sir Alexander Ball and his successors made many false promises to restore the lost wealth, leaving a lasting financial impact on many Maltese. The confiscation of the assets also resulted in the disruption of food supply to the island, causing around 2,000 fatalities and prompting many others to emigrate abroad following the Knights' departure.

Two other institutions that operated as quasi-banks were the Monte di Pietà and the Monte della Redenzione degli Schiavi. The Monti di Pieta was set up in 1598 and operated as an early banking institution fighting usury, which was prevalent at the time and associated with Jewish moneylenders, by providing loans secured by collateral to individuals in financial hardship, while the Monte della Redenzione degli Schiavi functioned as a fund for ransoming captives taken by Muslims. The two funds merged just before the Knights' expulsion from Malta in 1798. Like the Massa Frumentaria, the French despoiled the Monte di Pietà of its assets, valued at 443,484 scudi in 1798. (See main articles on the Monte di Pietà )and the Monte della Redenzione degli Schiavi.)

At the turn of the century, a farm labourer's daily income was only about one-third of a scudo, providing some context to the more than 2.2 million scudi looted from the Maltese financial system during the French occupation. (The daily wage of the farm labourer around the beginnings of the 1800s was 6¾ pence. At the time, the British pound sterling was subdivided into 20 shillings, each of 12 (old) pence, making it a total of 240 pence (see Sterling prior to decimalisation), which was also equivalent to 12 scudi, meaning that one scudo was equivalent to 20 pence. Hence, a farm labourer would need to work roughly three days to earn a scudo.) The looted funds were never returned.
