= Emmanuele Vitale =

Maltese notary, statesman and commander

- Born: 30 April 1758; Rabat, Hospitaller Malta
- Died: 8 October 1802 (aged 44); Gozo, Malta Protectorate
- Military career
- Allegiance: National Congress Battalions
- Service years: 1798–1800
- Rank: Generale Commandante
- Unit: National Congress Battalions
- Conflicts: Siege of Malta (1798–1800)

Emmanuele Vitale (30 April 1758 – 8 October 1802) was a Maltese notary, commander and statesman. During the Siege of Malta, he commanded 10,000 irregular Maltese soldiers.

== Biography ==
=== Early life ===
Emmanuel Vitale was born in Rabat on 30 April 1758. He was the son of Notary Saverio Vitale and Rosa née Caruana. Influenced by his father, he studied in Malta and became a notary. Also between 1785 and 1795, he succeeded his father and held the position of Chancellor of the Università at Mdina, for whom he was a great benefactor.

=== French Occupation of Malta ===
The French seized Malta from the Knights of St. John in 1798. The French troops left in Malta, under the command of General Claude-Henri Belgrand de Vaubois, immediately became unpopular. They frequently looted the churches of Malta, which led to Vitale hiding the treasures of the Church of Saint Joseph (Rabat) in his house. When the French attempted to loot damask and silver from a convent in Mdina, through Vitale's efforts, an angry mob amassed in order to prevent the French from doing so. The protests soon became an insurrection against the French, and Vitale was made commander-in-chief of the Maltese irregular forces (with the exception of the forces from Zebbug and Siggiewi who recognized Canon Francesco Saverio Caruana as their general). Under his command, they pushed the French out of Mdina, using a passageway behind St. Paul's Cathedral, Mdina and by the following day the Maltese recaptured Mdina for themselves, massacring the French garrison there. Taken by surprise, the French retreated into Valletta, where they held out throughout the rest of the siege.

Meanwhile, Vitale and the other leaders set up a provisional government, the National Assembly, at the Banca Giuratale of Mdina on 3 September. The Assembly appealed for foreign help and sent a representative to ask for aid in Naples. Vitale, Count Salvadore Manduca, Marquis Vincenzo de Piro and Count Ferdinand Thurna Castelliti sent a letter to the British Admiral Horatio Nelson for help. He and, soon after, Captain Alexander Ball arrived to provide reinforcements and later the Portuguese Marquis de Nisa (known to the Maltese as Nizza) provided troops, muskets and gunpowder. Due to disagreements on whom should lead, between Vitale and Caruana, Ball became the President of the Assembly. Afterwards, a National Congress was set up, made up of the village leaders and a couple of priests. Vitale was seen as a representative of Mdina, not as a general in the Congress. At first, Ball was highly critical of Vitale, describing him as ambitious and a bad administrator. This changed however upon seeing his leadership skills throughout the course of the siege. On 31 March 1800, he, along with about twenty other representatives, signed a letter stating that the Maltese wanted to become subjects of Great Britain. The French capitulated on 5 September 1800.

=== Later life ===
After the French left Malta, Britain set up a Protectorate over Malta, with Ball becoming a Civil Commissioner. He nominated Vitale to become luogotenente (village leader) of Senglea. On 21 August 1801, under the Civil Commissioner Charles Cameron, he was given the honour of being Governor, Superintendent and the Health Director of Gozo. He died on 8 October 1802 at the young age of 44.

== Legacy ==
Vitale is remembered in Malta for being one of the Maltese leaders in the insurrection. He was depicted on a postage stamp in 2002, though it is not known for certain if the stamp shows Vitale or a member of the Reggimento dell'Artiglieria e Bombardieri of the Order of Saint John.
