= Ġonna tal-Kmand =

Group of gardens in Malta

- Ball Gardens; Lieutenants' Gardens
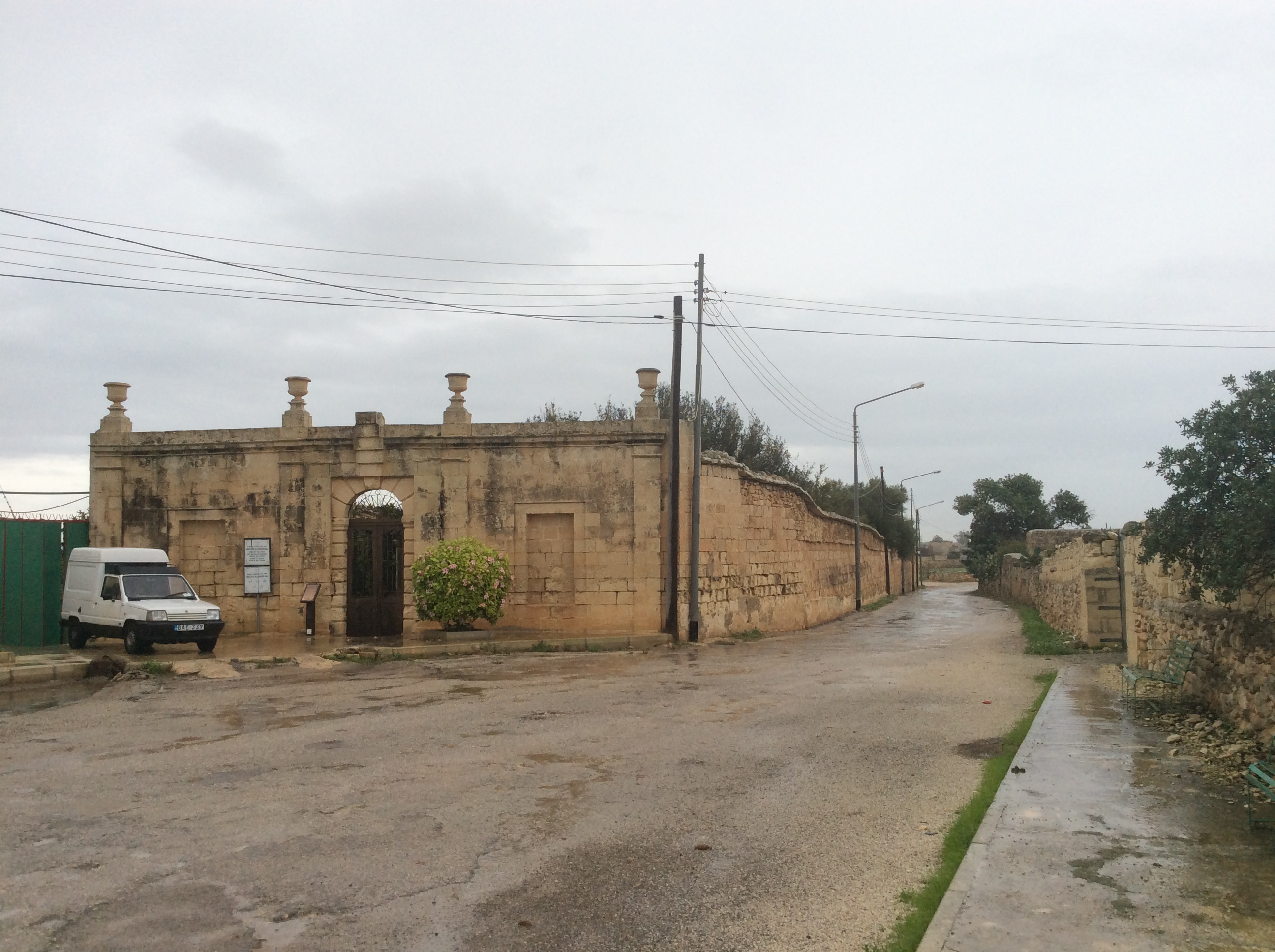
- Sir Alexander Ball's Garden in Safi, one of the few well-preserved surviving gardens
- Type: Gardens
- Location: Malta
- Opened: Early 19th-century
- Founder: Alexander Ball
- Status: Some are intact, some were modified, others destroyed

The Ġonna tal-Kmand (transl. Commanders' Gardens), formerly known as Ġonna tal-Kutnent (transl. Lieutenants' Gardens) and sometimes known as Ball Gardens, are a group of gardens in various localities in Malta, which were built in the early years of the 19th century when the island was a British protectorate. The gardens were commissioned by Civil Commissioner Alexander Ball between 1802 and 1805, and were given to the Luogotenenti in charge of the towns or villages.

A total of 21 gardens were established. About half of these were destroyed in the 20th century, while the others have survived in various states of maintenance. Well-preserved gardens include those at Gudja, Għargħur, Qrendi and Żejtun.

== History ==
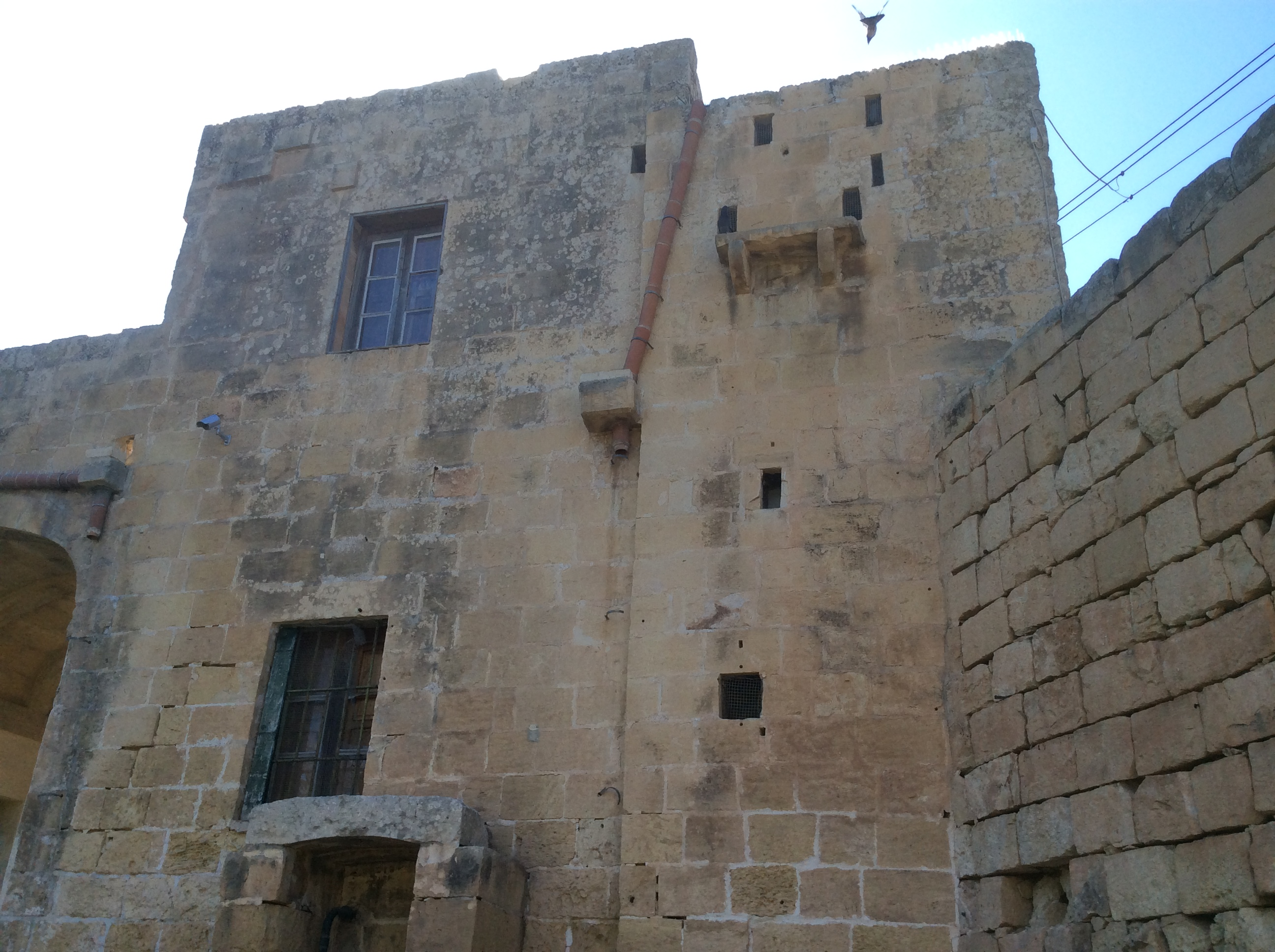
Pigeon holes at Luqa Briffa Garden

Sir Alexander Ball was Civil Commissioner of Malta from 1799 to 1801, and again from 1802 until his death in 1809. During his second term, between 1802 and 1805, he commissioned 21 gardens to be built in various casali (towns or villages) around Malta. Ball meant that the gardens would be accessible to the public, and he gave them to the temporary Luogotenenti (lieutenants) who were responsible for the administration of the casali. The Luogotenenti did not open the gardens to the public but kept them for their own use, and the gardens subsequently became known as Il-Ġonna tal-Kmand, which means "Commander's Garden" in Maltese.

The gardens were meant to increase the greenery around the Maltese Islands. They were also used for agricultural experimentation, and this resulted in the introduction of the potato crop which yielded greater revenue than cotton, Malta's primary agricultural export at the time. Ball also meant the gardens be used to freely provide farmers with seeds and shrubs, but this was not done and the gardens were not always well-maintained since the Luogotenenti were inexperienced with agricultural improvement.

Several architects were involved in the design and construction of the gardens, including the cousins Antonio and Michele Cachia, and the layout is influenced by 18th-century Italian gardens. Each garden was surrounded by high boundary walls, and they had stone pathways flanked with pillars. Stone water conduits were built for irrigation. Most of them also had some service rooms which incorporated pigeon holes. The entrances of some of the gardens were decorated with a relief of the royal cypher of King George III, and they also had an inscription which read as follows:

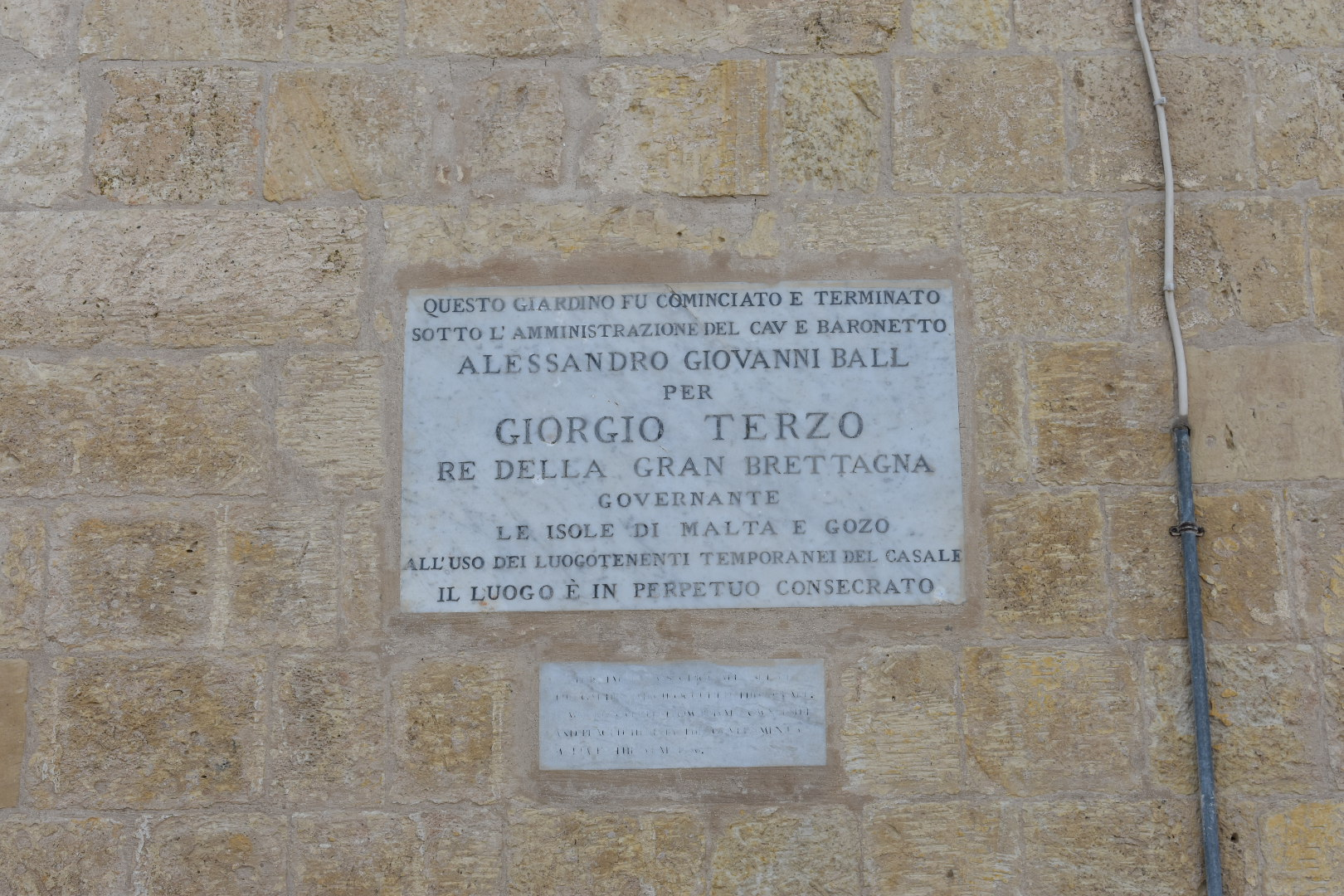
The inscription from the Żabbar garden

QUESTO GIARDINO FU COMINCIATO E TERMINATO

SOTTO L'AMMINISTRAZIONE DEL CAV E BARONETTO
ALESSANDRO GIOVANNI BALL
PER
GIORGIO TERZO
RE DELLA GRAN BRETTAGNA
GOVERNANTE
LE ISOLE DI MALTA E GOZO
ALL'USO DEI LUOGOTENENTI TEMPORANEI DEL CASALE
IL LUOGO È IN PERPETUO CONSECRATO
(meaning This garden was commenced and completed under the administration of the knight and baronet Alexander John Ball for George the Third, King of Great Britain, ruler of the islands of Malta and Gozo, for the use of the temporary lieutenants of the village in everlasting sacred memory.)

Some of the gardens were destroyed over the years, but the ones at Attard, Balzan, Għargħur, Gudja, Lija, Mosta, Qrendi, Safi, Siġġiewi, Żebbuġ and Żejtun still survive today, in different states of preservation. All of them are government-owned, and some are leased to private individuals while others are maintained by the local councils. Eight gardens, together with the remains of the Żabbar garden, were scheduled as Grade 1 national monuments by the Malta Environment and Planning Authority in 2009, while the remaining three gardens were scheduled in 2010. The remains of the Għaxaq garden were scheduled as a Grade 2 property in 2013.

The gardens of Gudja, Safi, Siġġiewi, Żebbuġ and Żejtun are also listed on the National Inventory of the Cultural Property of the Maltese Islands.

== Surviving gardens ==
=== Attard ===
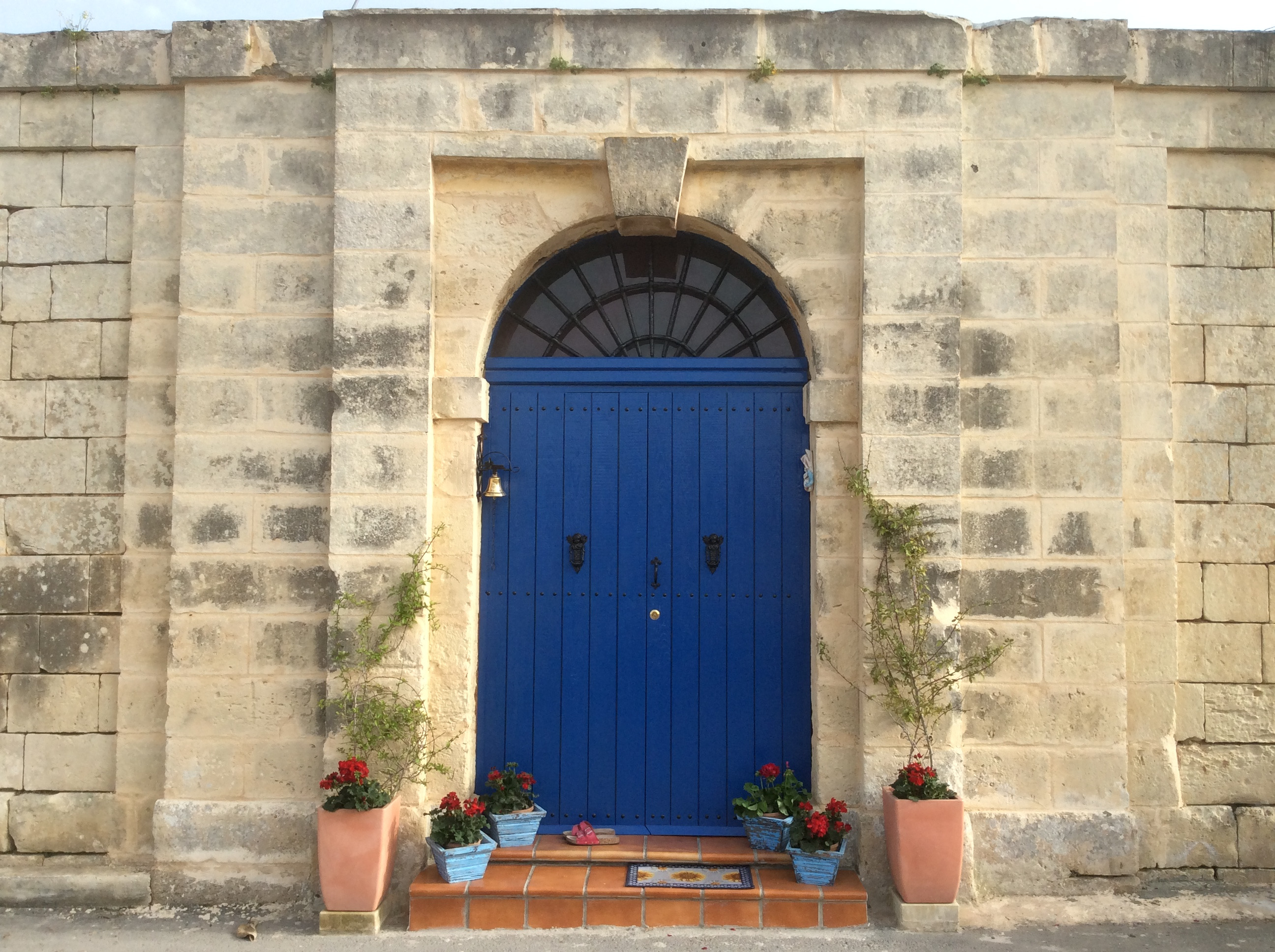
Il-Ġnien tal-Kmand in Attard

The garden at Attard is located at Triq Annibale Preca (Annibale Preca Street). The garden and belonging structures are a Grade 1 scheduled property.

=== Balzan ===
The garden at Balzan is located at Triq in-Naxxar (Naxxar Road), close to Ta' Ganu Windmill. It has been a Grade 1 property since 2010.

=== Għargħur ===
The garden at Għargħur is located at the aptly-named Triq il-Ġnien (Garden Street). The garden includes a building which served as the house of the Luogotenente. The building was designed by Antonio Cachia in 1803. A commemorative plaque, with Italian words making reference to King George III, and a sculpture made to sculpt for British insignia (but never completed) are located above the main entrance. The house and garden are leased to private individuals and are not accessible to the public.

=== Gudja ===
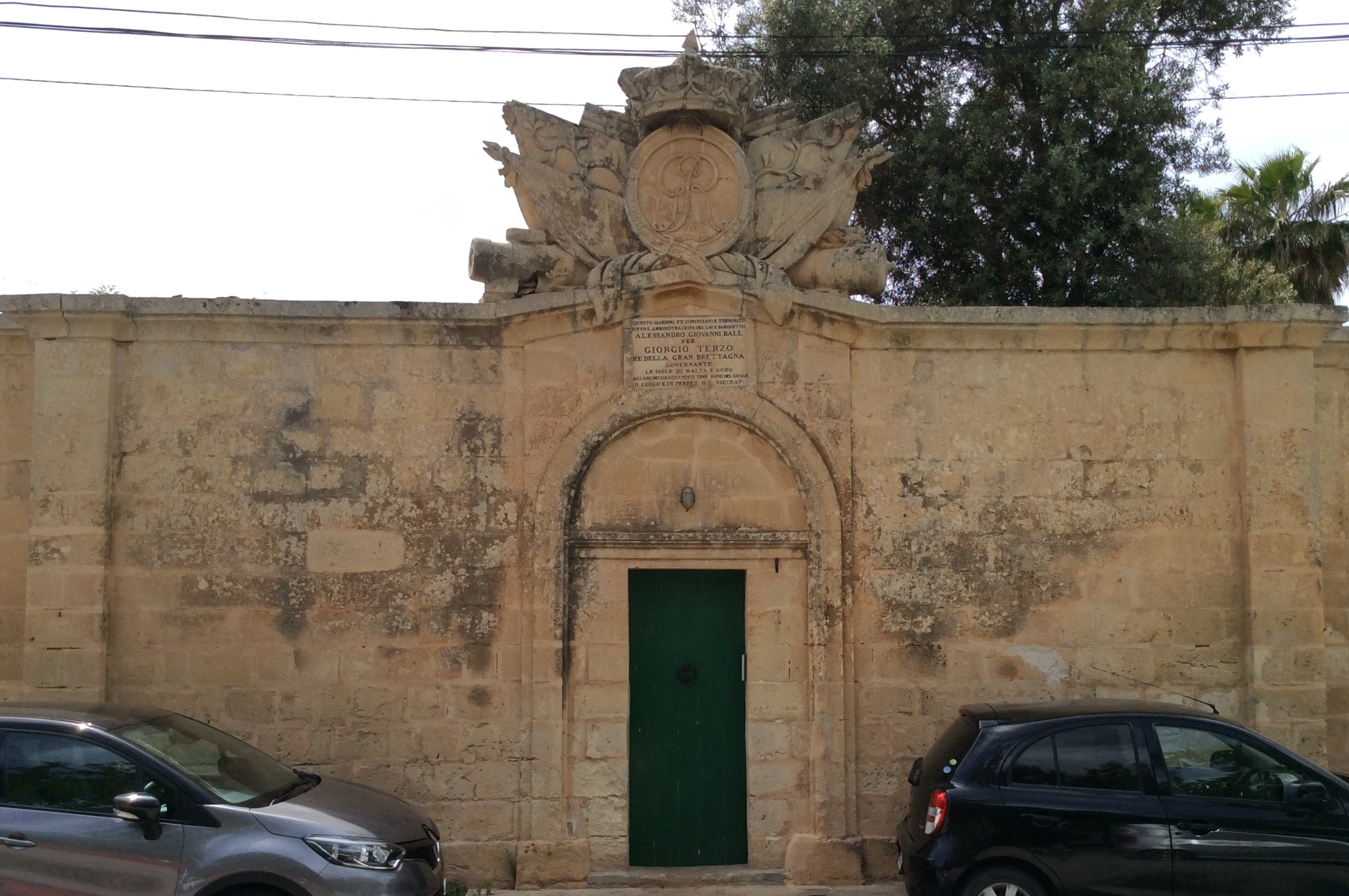
Il-Ġnien tal-Kmand in Gudja

The garden at Gudja is located at Triq Bir Miftuħ (Bir Miftuħ Street). The entrance is embellished with the royal cypher and an inscription.

=== Lija ===
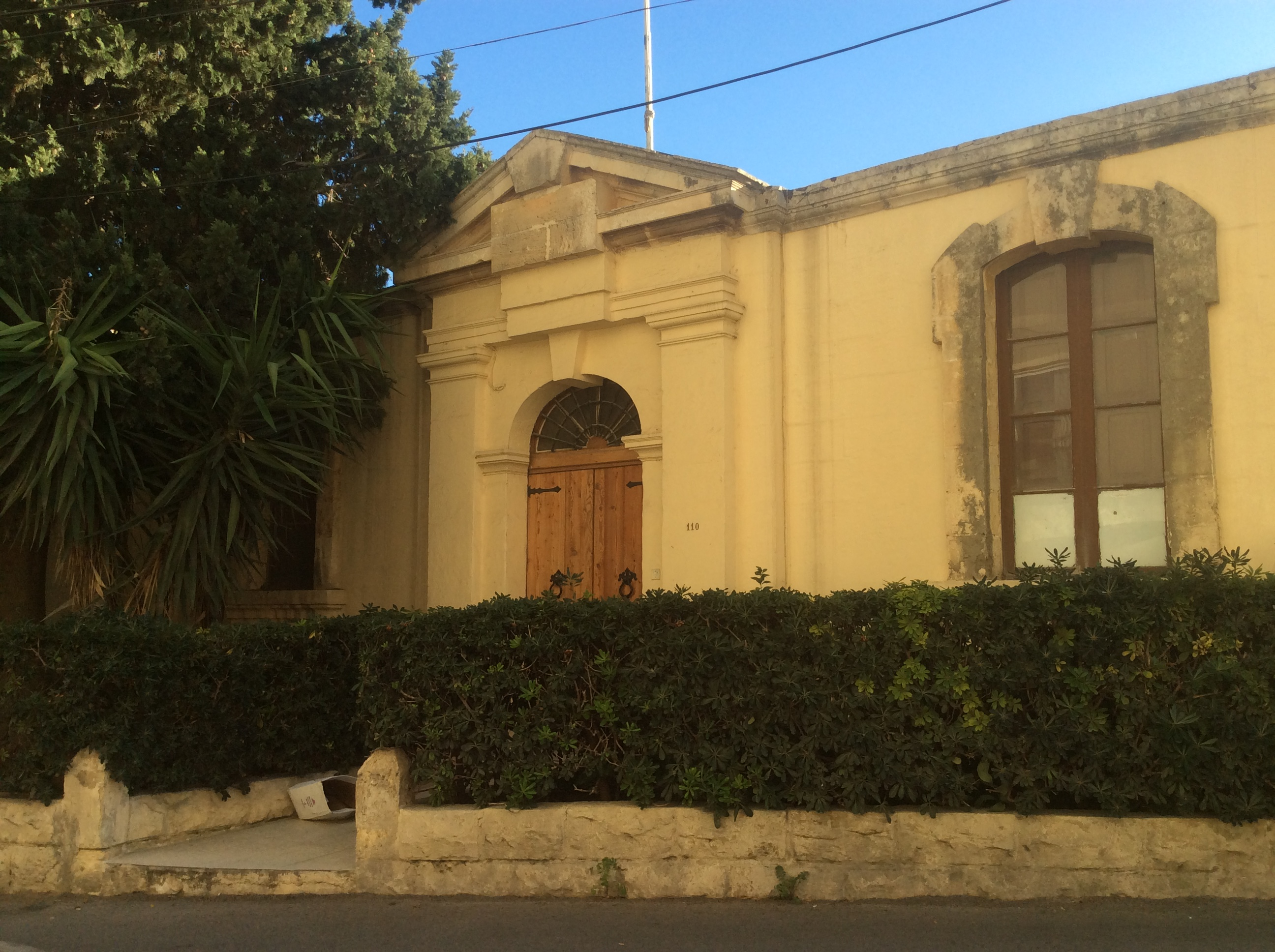
The entrance flanked by two windows. The site is now occupied by the Plant Biotechnology Centre.

The garden at Lija is located at Triq Annibale Preca (Annibale Preca Street), in an area known as Tal-Mirakli close to the boundary with Attard. This garden has been partially built up as the Plant Biotechnology Centre and its laboratories. It has reservoirs which feed into the nearby San Anton Palace.

It is open to the public during occasions or by appointment as Ġnien il-Pjanti Maltin (Maltese Plants Garden).

=== Mosta ===
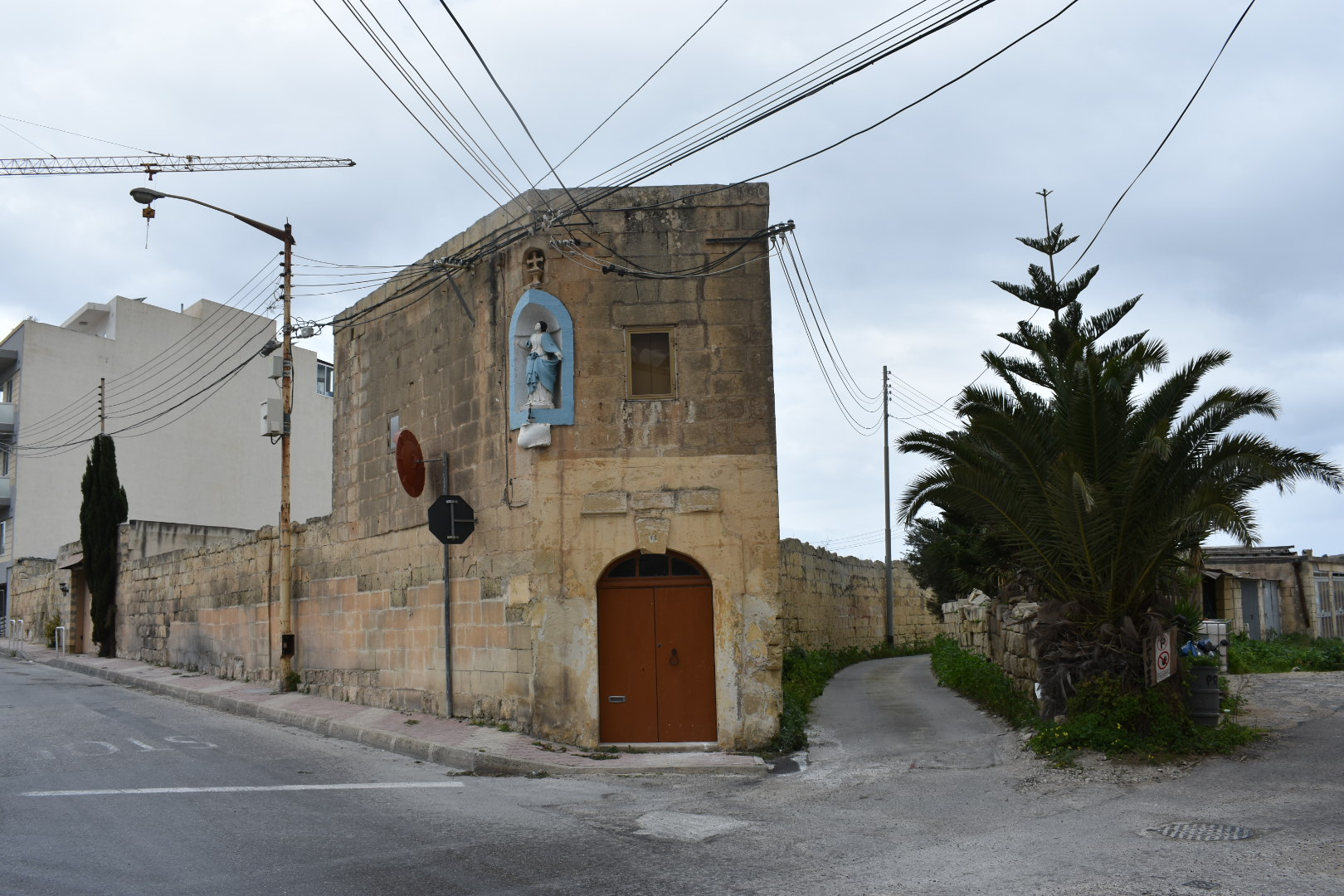
Il-Ġnien tal-Kmand in Mosta

The garden at Mosta is located at Triq il-Kbira (Main Street). it is now scheduled at Grade 1.

=== Qrendi ===
The garden at Qrendi is located at the corner of Triq Santa Katerina (St. Catherine Street) and Triq Dwardu Borg (Dwardu Borg Street). The entrance contains an inscription, but no royal cypher. It is the largest of the surviving gardens, and it is subdivided into two parts, a small enclosed garden and a large field at the back. It contains orange, olive, lemon, pear, pomegranate, fig, medlar and plum trees, along with prickly pears. A reservoir is also found within the garden.

The garden is now known as the Barn Owl’s Garden. At one point, there were plans to build a house for the elderly on the site of the field that forms part of the garden, but the plans were refused.

=== Safi ===
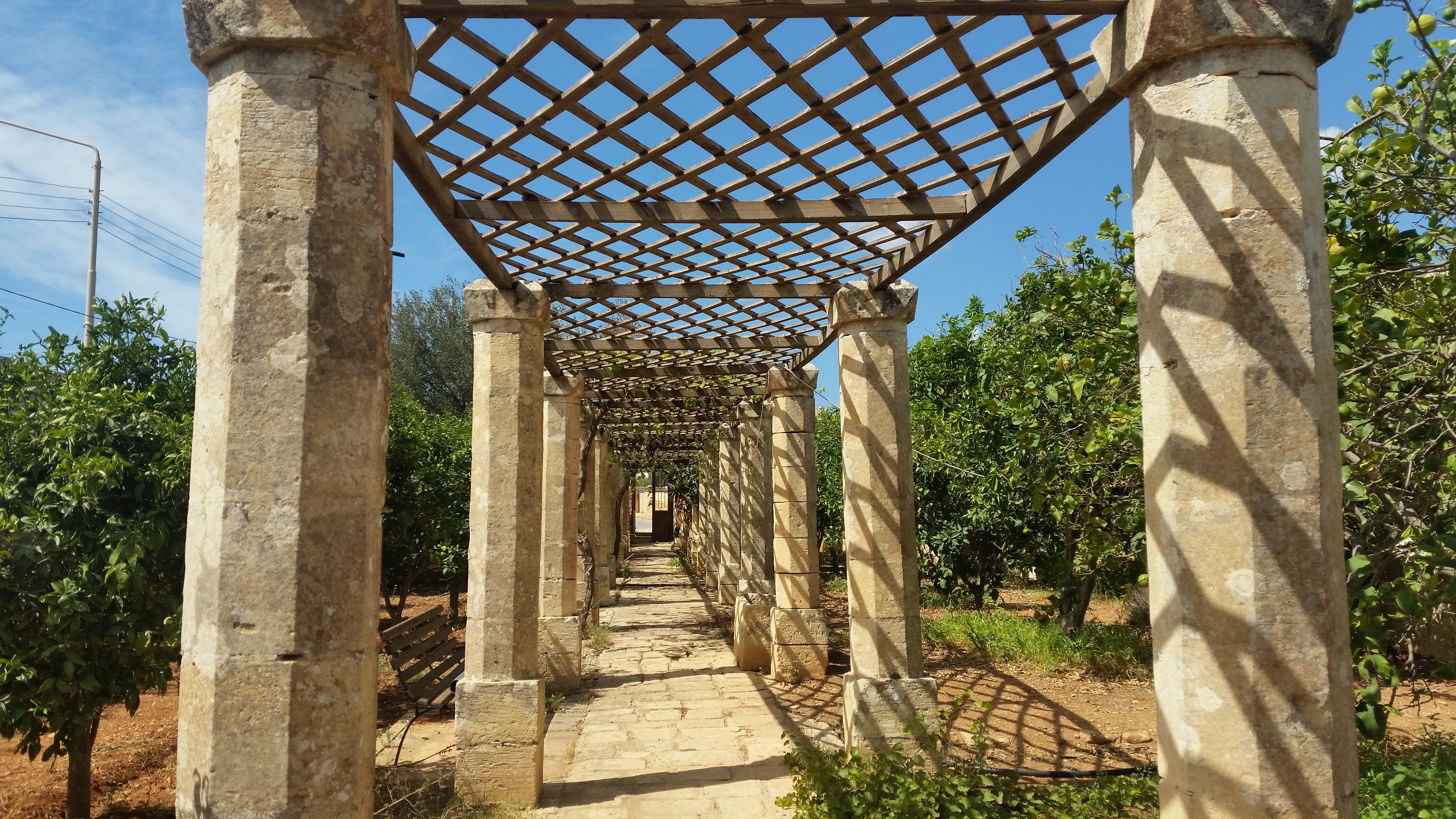
Inside Sir Alexander Ball's Garden in Safi

The garden at Safi is located at Triq ta' Ġawhar (Ta' Ġawhar Street). The entrance of the garden consists of a portal flanked by two window-like depressions in the wall. The garden is open to the public, and it is known as Sir Alexander Ball's Garden (Maltese: Ġnien Sir Alexander Ball).

=== Siġġiewi ===
The garden at Siġġiewi is located at Triq Lapsi (Lapsi Street). The entrance of the garden consists of a portal flanked by two window-like depressions in the wall.

=== Żebbuġ ===
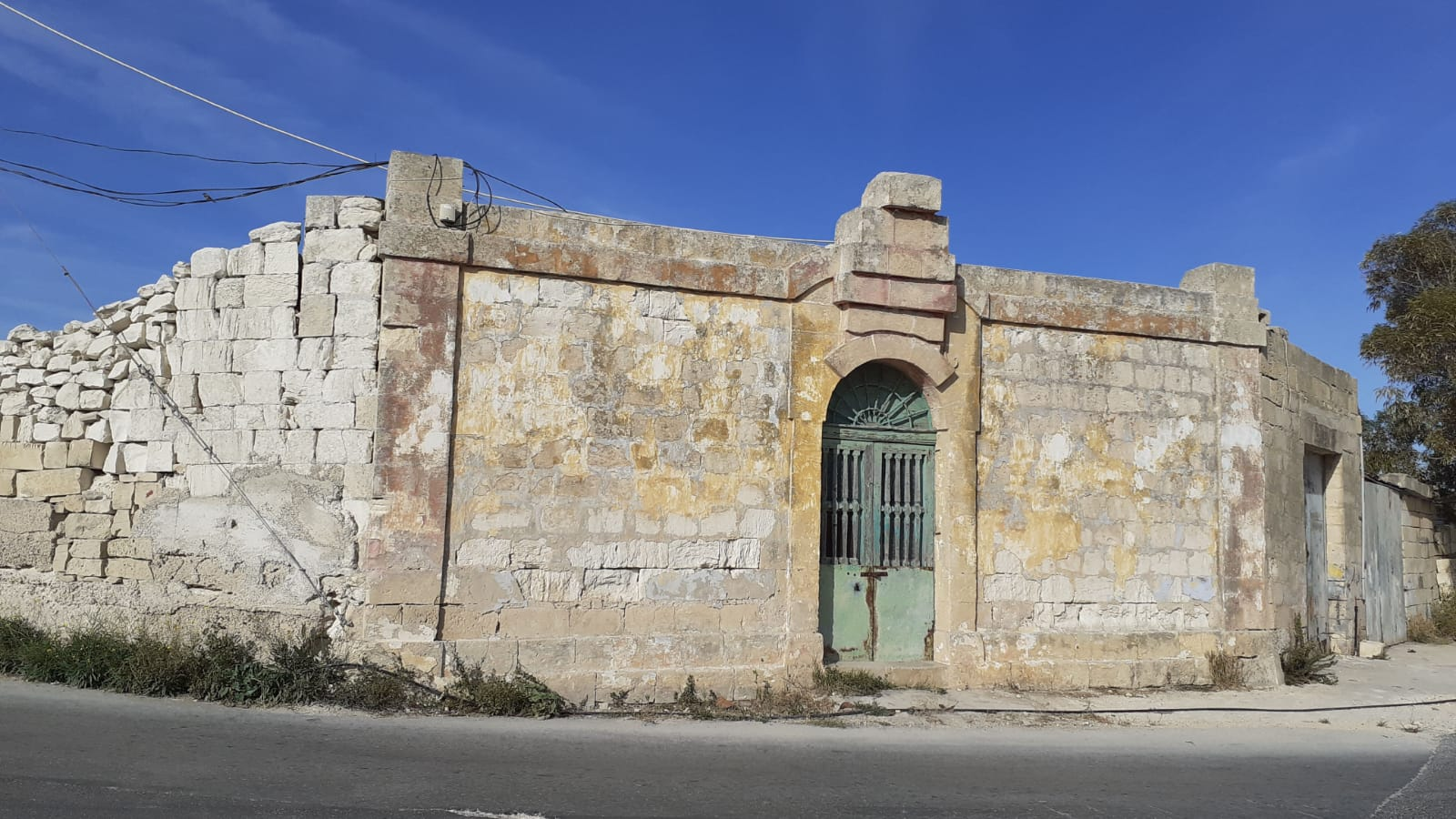
The portal with the unfinished emblem.

The garden at Żebbuġ is located at Triq it-Tiġrija (Tiġrija Street). It has a plain façade with a portal and an unfinished emblem.

=== Żejtun ===
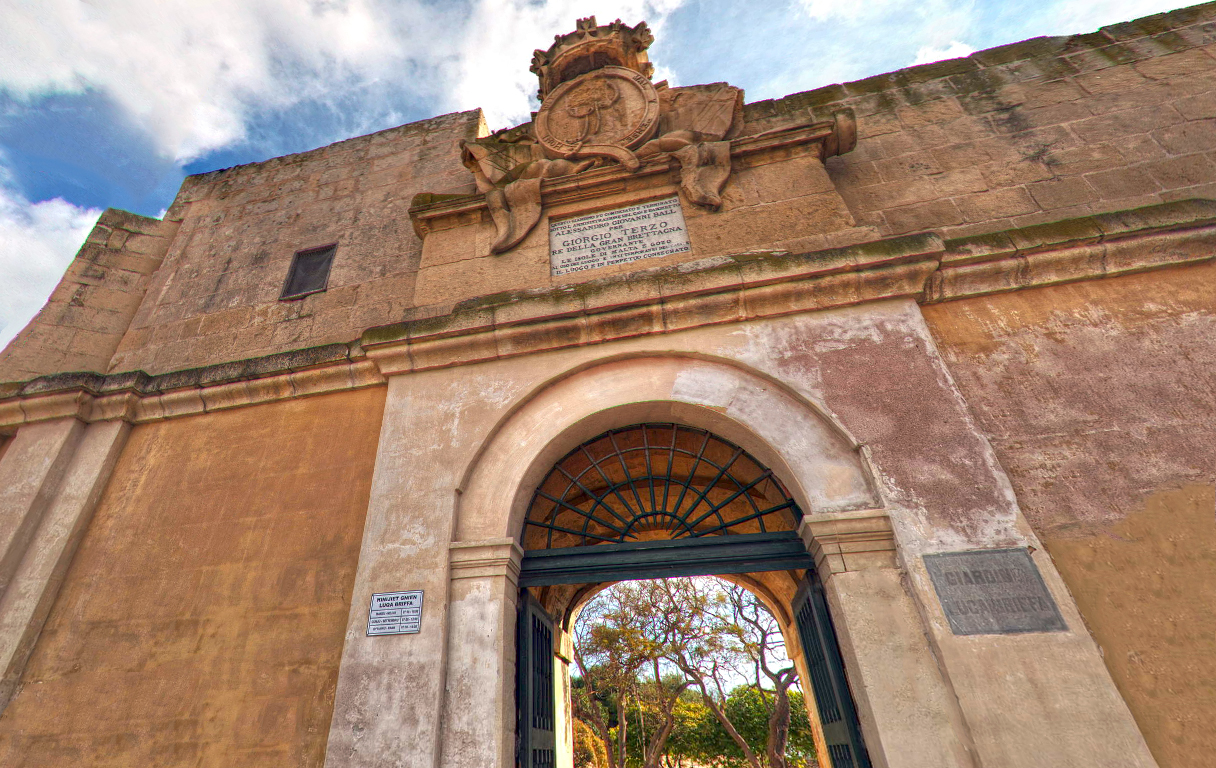
Luqa Briffa Garden in Żejtun

The garden at Żejtun is located at the corner of Triq Xrobb l-Għaġin (Xrobb l-Għaġin Street) and Triq id-Daħla ta' San Tumas (St. Thomas Inlet Street). The entrance is embellished with the royal cypher and an inscription. The garden was designed by Michele Cachia.

Today, the Żejtun garden is well-maintained, and it is open to the public as Luqa Briffa Garden (Maltese: Ġnien Luqa Briffa).

== Destroyed gardens ==
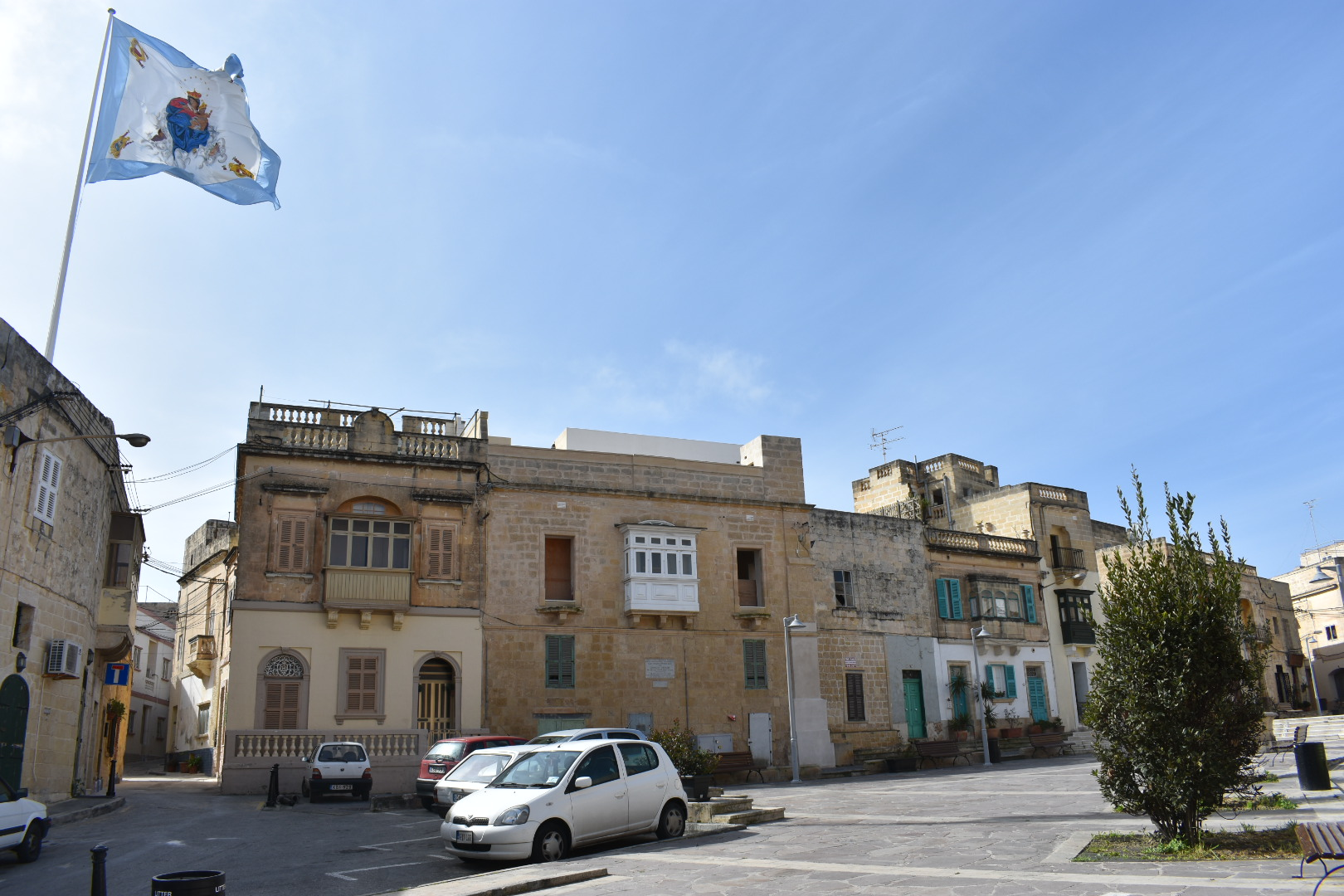
Misraħ is-Sliem, site of the Żabbar garden. The house of the commandant still exists (centre).

The garden at Għaxaq has been largely built up, although some parts of it are still in existence, and can be seen from Triq San Filippu (St. Philip Street).

The garden at Żabbar was located at present-day Misraħ is-Sliem (Peace Square). The garden's inscription, which is identical to that found at other gardens, still survives and it is affixed onto the façade of a house in this square.

The garden at Naxxar was located at the rear of Palazzo Nasciaro, which might have served as the residence of the Luogotenente. This garden has been built up as various houses.

Gardens at Lija, Luqa, Mqabba, Qormi and Żurrieq were destroyed in the 20th century to make way for housing, schools or other buildings.
