= Malta Protectorate =

1800–1813 British protectorate in the Mediterranean Sea

Coordinates: 35°53′N 14°30′E

British Protectorate of Malta Protettorato di Malta (Italian) Protettorat ta' Malta (Maltese)
- 1800–1813
- Flag
- Anthem: "God Save the King" (Note: "God Save the King" is the national anthem by custom, not statute, and there is no authorised version. Typically only the first verse is usually sung, although the second verse is also often sung as well at state and public events. The words King, he, him, his, used at present, are replaced by Queen, she, her when the monarch is female.)
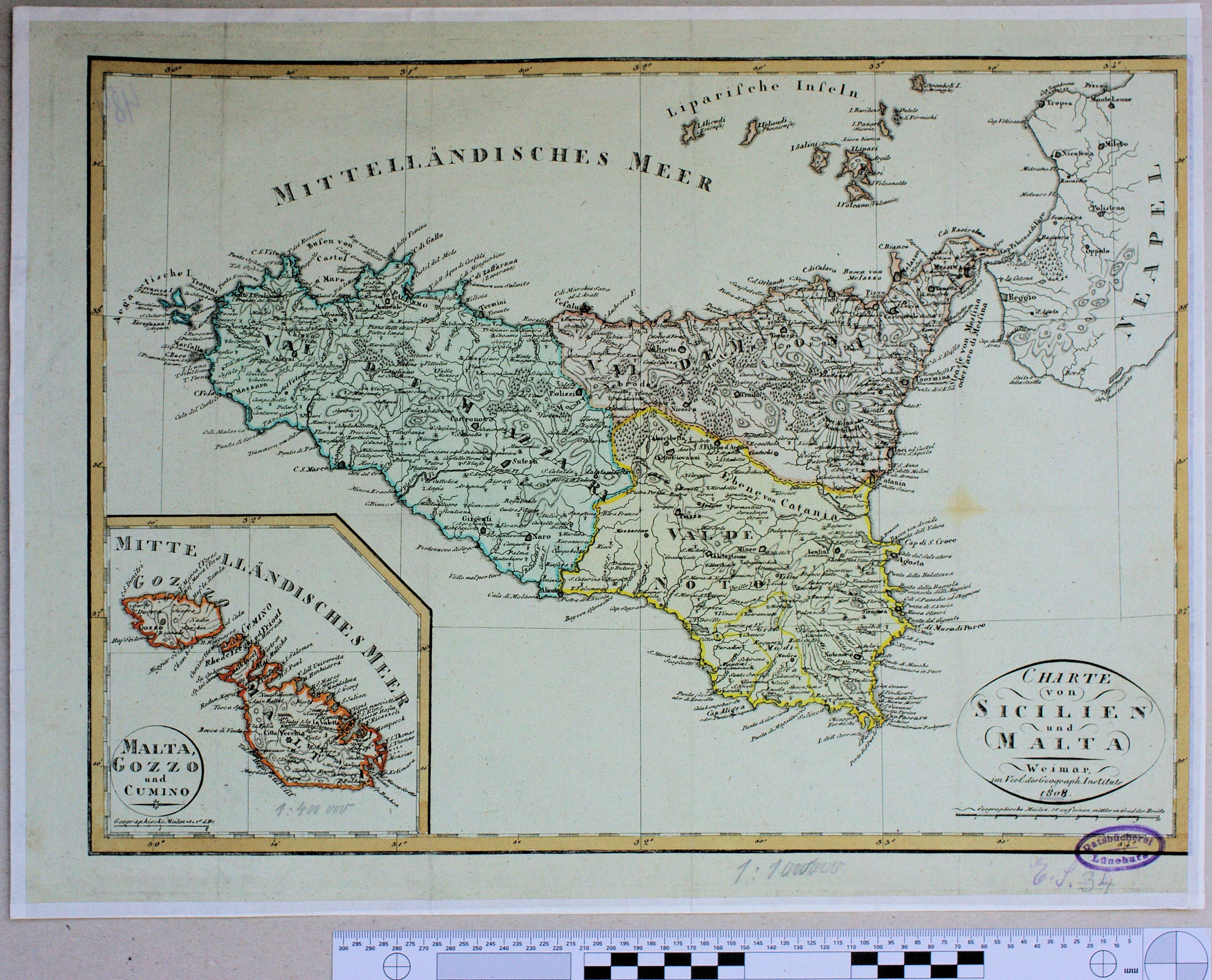
- Map of Malta and Sicily, 1808
- Status: Protectorate of the United Kingdom
- Capital: Valletta
- Common languages: Italian (official); English; Maltese (majority)
- Religion: Roman Catholicism
- Monarch
  - 1800–13: George III
- Civil Commissioner
  - 1799–1801: Alexander Ball
  - 1801: Henry Pigot
  - 1801–02: Charles Cameron
  - 1802–09: Alexander Ball
  - 1810–13: Hildebrand Oakes
- Historical era: Napoleonic Wars
  - Surrendered to the British: 4 September 1800
  - Declaration of Rights: June 1802
  - Disestablished: 23 July 1813

Population
  - 1807: 93,054
- Currency: Maltese scudo
Preceded by	Succeeded by
French occupation of Malta; Gozitan Nation	Crown Colony of Malta

Malta Protectorate (Italian: Protettorato di Malta, Maltese: Protettorat ta' Malta) was the political term for Malta when it was a British protectorate. The protectorate existed between the capitulation of the French forces in Malta in 1800 and the transformation of the islands to the Crown Colony of Malta in 1813.

== Background ==
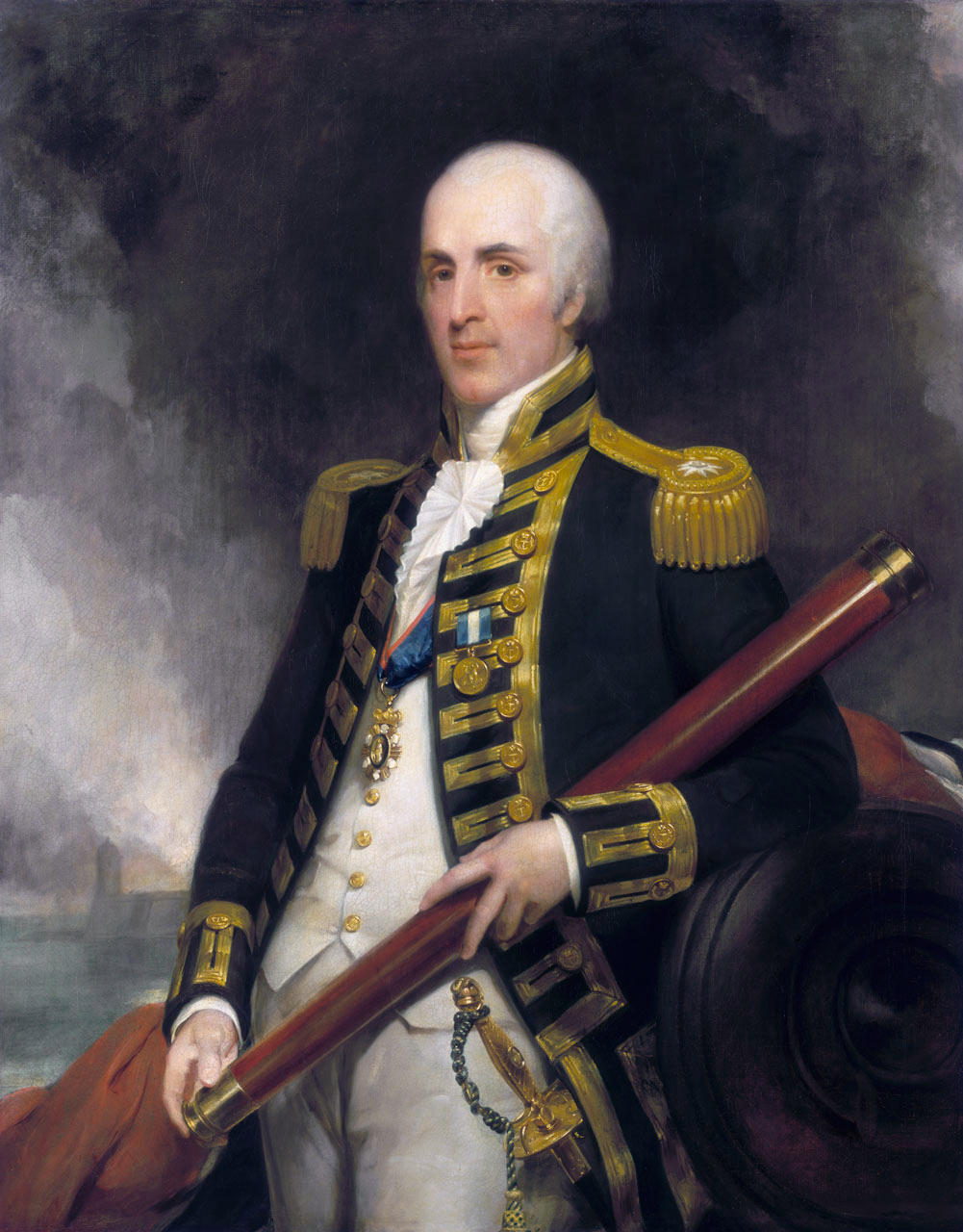
Sir Alexander Ball, Civil Commissioner of Malta, 1799–1801 and 1802–1809

During the Maltese uprising against the French, the Maltese people formed a National Assembly as a provisional government. Messengers were sent to the British fleet in Sicily for help, and a British convoy consisting of 13 battered ships under Captain Sir James Saumarez appeared off the island in late September 1798. In October Sir Alexander Ball arrived in Malta, and a year later he was appointed as Civil Commissioner.

1803 cartoon about the evacuation of Malta

The French garrison under General Vaubois had been driven to Mosta, and finally surrendered on 4 September 1800. Malta therefore became a British protectorate. In August 1801, the Civil Commissioner, Charles Cameron, appointed Emmanuel Vitale as Governor of Gozo instead of Saverio Cassar. This effectively brought an end to Gozo's independence as la Nazione Gozitana.

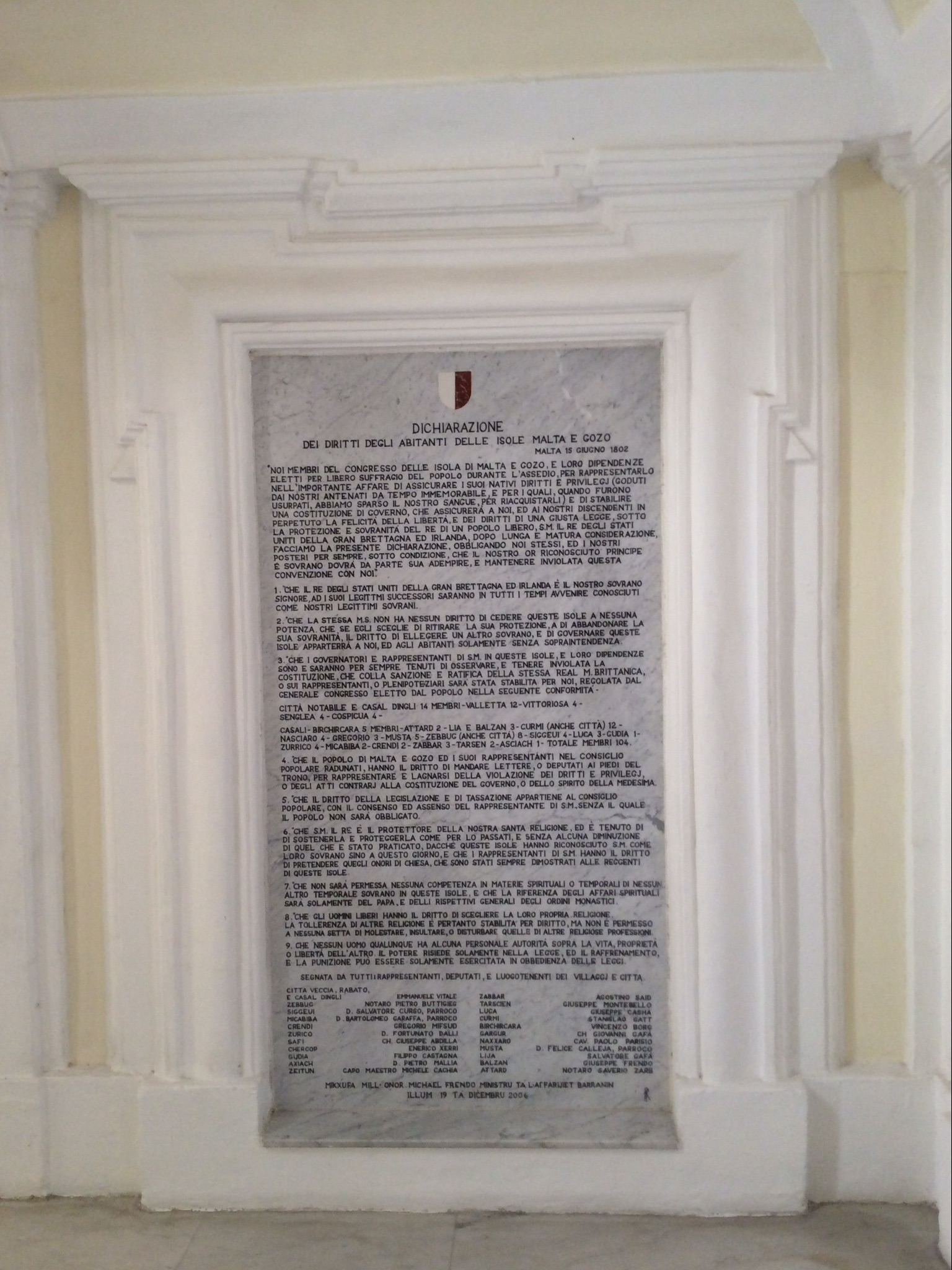
The Declaration of Rights of the inhabitants of the Islands of Malta and Gozo, of 1802, at Palazzo Parisio

== Declaration of Rights ==
In June 1802, 104 representatives from the Maltese towns and villages signed a declaration entitled La Dichiarazione dei Diritti degli abitanti delle Isole di Malta e Gozo (The Declaration of Rights of the inhabitants of the Islands of Malta and Gozo) by which they proclaimed George III to be their king and that he had no right to surrender Malta to another power. By the Declaration they also proclaimed that Malta should be self-governing while under British protection.

== Economic prosperity ==
Harbour activity in Malta increased, which included USS George Washington, the first American warship to navigate the Mediterranean in early 1801. Valletta emerged as a crucial logistical and diplomatic base for the American forces in their war against North African corsairs, known as the First Barbary War (1801-1805). American warships, such as the USS Constitution, docked in Malta's Grand Harbour to obtain fresh water, supplies, and essential repairs, which enabled the American squadron to maintain its blockade and operations against the Barbary States. It also contributed to an audacious plan by US Lieutenant Stephen Decatur, who employed a seized Tripolitan vessel (renamed the Intrepid), disguised as a merchant ship from Malta and outfitted with British colours, to infiltrate Tripoli harbour and destroy the USS Philadelphia, which had been captured by the Tripolitans.

Under the terms of the 1802 Treaty of Amiens with France, Britain was supposed to evacuate the islands, but failed to keep this obligation - one of several mutual cases of non-adherence to the treaty, which eventually led to its collapse and the resumption of war between the two countries. Between 1802 and 1806, Southern Europe received a fifth of British exports to Europe, or £3,200,000 per year, while Northern Europe accounted for four-fifths of British exports to Europe, with an average of £12,800,000 annually. In 1806, Napoleon's Continental Blockade disrupted commercial connections between England and several European nations. Between 1808 and 1812, the share to Southern Europe increased to sixty percent, averaging £10,000,000 annually, primarily through Malta and Sicily. In addition, Malta served as a staging point for the importation of raw materials and commodities from the Barbary States and the Levant to England and to the Austrian States.

Port activity surged to an impressive average of 1,500 ships visiting Malta every year. Ironically, the surge in commercial activity partially reversed the poverty and destruction caused by the Maltese insurrection against French control a few years earlier. The circulating currency used in Malta reflected this international trade, comprising a mixture of Maltese scudi and tari from the era of the Order, Sicilian, Spanish and South American dollars, together with British gold sovereigns and half sovereigns. This period of economic prosperity led to the foundation of institutional banking on the islands with the first Maltese bank, the Anglo Maltese Bank, formed on 23 June 1809 by Maltese and British merchants, followed by the Banco Di Malta and Tagliaferro's Bank in 1812. The conclusion of the Napoleonic Wars and an epidemic in 1813 ultimately brought an end to the golden era of the Anglo-Maltese trade. Nevertheless, this set the basis for Malta becoming a major British overseas naval base for the following 150 years.

== Population ==
A census in 1807 derived using parish church records indicates a population of 93,054, with a third of the population residing mainly around Valletta and Floriana. A contemporary document provides a detailed distribution of the population across the Maltese towns and villages of the time:

Current Name	known as		Current Name	known as	
Towns and villages in Malta			Dingli	Dingli	405
Mdina & Rabat	Notabile e suo Borgo	3,731	Tarxien	Tarxen	589
Valletta & Floriana	Valletta e Floriana	24,546	Għargħur	Gargur	974
Cospicua	Cospicua	6,224	Safi	Safi	173
Vittoriosa	Vittoriosa	3,450	Kirkop	Chercop	275
Senglea	Senglea	4,200	Luqa	Luca	845
Birkirkara	Birchircara	3,900	Balzan	Balzan	442
Naxxar	Naxaro	2,355	Lija	Lia	900
Qormi	Curmi	3,800	Total		80,196
Zurrieq	Zurrico	3,130			
Żejtun	Zeitun	4,024	Towns and villages in Gozo		
Gudja	Gudia	870	Cittadella & Victoria	Castello e Rabato	5,080
Siġġiewi	Siggevi	2,700	Xagħra	Casal Caccia	1,516
Żebbuġ	Zebbug	4,026	Għarb	Casal Garbo	1,459
Attard	Attard	735	Nadur	Casal Nadur	1,845
Mosta	Musta	2,625	Xewkija	Casal Xeuhia	1,350
Mqabba	Micabiba	703	Sannat	Casal Sannat	815
Qrendi	Crendi	924	Żebbuġ	Casal Zebbug	750
Għaxaq	Hasciac	1,000	Sub Total		12,815
Żabbar	Zabbar	2,650	Grand Total		93,011

== Lampedusa ==
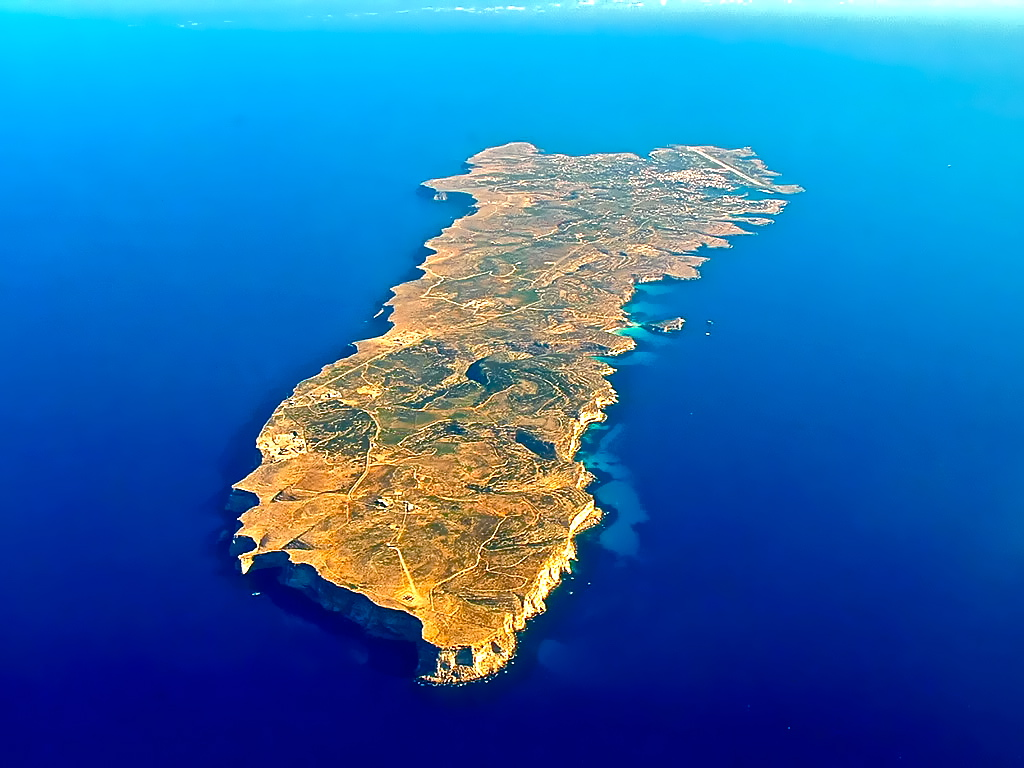
Aerial view of Lampedusa

Politically, Lampedusa was also part of the Kingdom of Sicily. In the late 18th century, while Malta was still under the Knights, the Prince of Lampedusa had let the island to Salvatore Gatt, a Maltese entrepreneur, who settled on the island with a few Maltese workers.

The British considered taking over Lampedusa as a naval base instead of Malta, but the idea was dropped as the island did not have deep harbours and was not well developed. Despite this, the authorities in Malta and the British government still attempted to take over the island as they believed that it could be used to supply Malta with food in case Sicily fell to Napoleon.

In 1800, Ball sent a Commissariat to Lampedusa to assess the feasibility of this and the result was that the island could easily be used to supply Malta with food at a relatively low cost as there was grazing ground and an adequate water supply. In 1803, some Maltese farmers settled on Lampedusa with cattle and sheep, and they began to grow barley.

In 1810, Salvatore Gatt transferred the lease to Alexander Fernandez, the British Commissariat, and the latter attempted to create a large Maltese colony on the island. This never materialized as a Royal commission in 1812 stated that this was just a business venture and Britain refused to help Fernandez. Further problems arose when the plague devastated Malta in 1813–14, and on 25 September 1814, Sir Thomas Maitland withdrew British troops from Lampedusa.

Fernandez remained proprietor of the island until 1818, when Gatt returned and remained there with his family up to 1824.

== Crown Colony ==
In 1813 the island was transformed into a British Crown colony by the Bathurst Constitution. On 23 July Sir Thomas Maitland replaced Sir Hildebrand Oakes and was the first Civil Commissioner to be given the title of "Governor". Malta officially became a colony by the Treaty of Paris in 1814.

== See also ==
- Ġonna tal-Kmand
- 1806 Birgu polverista explosion
- Froberg mutiny
