= HMS Germaine (1781) =

Sloop of the Royal Navy

History

Great Britain
- Name: Americain
- Namesake: Lord Germain
- Acquired: 1781 by capture
- Renamed: HMS Germaine
- Fate: Sold 1804

General characteristics
- Tons burthen: 261 (bm)
- Length: 88 ft 0 in (26.8 m) (overall); c.70 ft 9 in (21.6 m)
- Beam: 26 ft 4 in (8.0 m)
- Propulsion: Sails
- Sail plan: Sloop
- Complement: 110
- Armament: 14 guns

HMS Germaine (or Germain), was the American mercantile vessel Americain that the British Royal Navy captured in 1781 when it captured Saint Eustatius. The British took her into service as HMS Germaine, perpetuating the name of her predecessor captured earlier that year. She captured a number of small prizes in 1782. The Navy sold her in 1784.

== Career ==
Britain declared war on the Netherlands on 20 December 1780. Even before officially declaring war, Britain had outfitted a fleet under Admiral George Brydges Rodney to capture St. Eustatius. The British fleet arrived on 3 February 1781, and the outnumbered Dutch defenders surrendered after a pro forma resistance. Lieutenant George Augustus Keppel, a Rodney protege, received his commission as Commander of Americain/Germaine on 14 February; the Admiralty confirmed the appointment in December. Germaine was fitted out at Jamaica on 23 February.

In early March 1782 an American squadron of five privateers (Porus, Junius Brutus, Franklin, Holker, and Pilgrim), all under the overall command of John Carnes in Porus, attempted to capture Tortola. They were unable to maintain surprise and had to call off their attack, though they did take some small prizes. On 6 March Junius Brutus and Holker engaged HMS Experiment but the out-gunned Experiment managed to escape. She arrived at Antigua and was immediately ordered to join a small squadron that was sailing to find the Americans. The squadron was under the command of Captain John Linzee in the frigate Santa Monica, and also included Convert, and Germaine. The British were unable to find the Americans, who had left. Santa Monica hit a rock on 1 April and bilged, but Linzee was able to run her aground. One man was lost. The other three vessels rescued the remainder of her crew and salvaged much of her stores and her guns.

Although Germaine was part of Rodney's fleet, she was not at the Battle of the Saintes, despite some reports to the contrary. (Note: Rodney's report of his line of battle specifically enumerates several vessels, Germaine among them, that were not with the fleet during the action.)

Lieutenant Alexander Ball was promoted commander on 14 April, two days after the battle, and took command of Germaine, replacing Keppel. (Note: Keppel was reportedly sailing back to England as a passenger on Centaur when she was lost in September near the Newfoundland Banks during the 1782 Central Atlantic hurricane.)

In August Germaine captured four small prizes:

- Schooner carrying rice from Campeachy to Havana. Germaine captured her near Jamaica on 10 August, took off the rice, and let her go.
- Spanish polacre St. Joseph, Thomas Claussel, master, of 30 men, six guns, and 280 tons. She had been sailing from Providence to Havana, when Germaine drove her on shore in Yaco Bay on 17 August.
- American schooner Betsy, Basil Lord, master, of three men and 14 tons. She had been sailing from Savannah to Providence with a cargo of rice when captured on 24 August.
- American privateer schooner Laurens, Samuel Johnson, master, of four guns, 15 men, and 25 tons. She had been on a cruise from Washington, North Carolina, when Germaine captured her on 27 August.
- American schooner Fox, also captured on 27 August.

== Fate ==
Germaine arrived at Deptford on 29 January 1784, where she was paid off shortly thereafter. She was sold there, for £620, on 25 March 1784.
