= San Anton Palace =

- Il-Palazz Sant'Anton
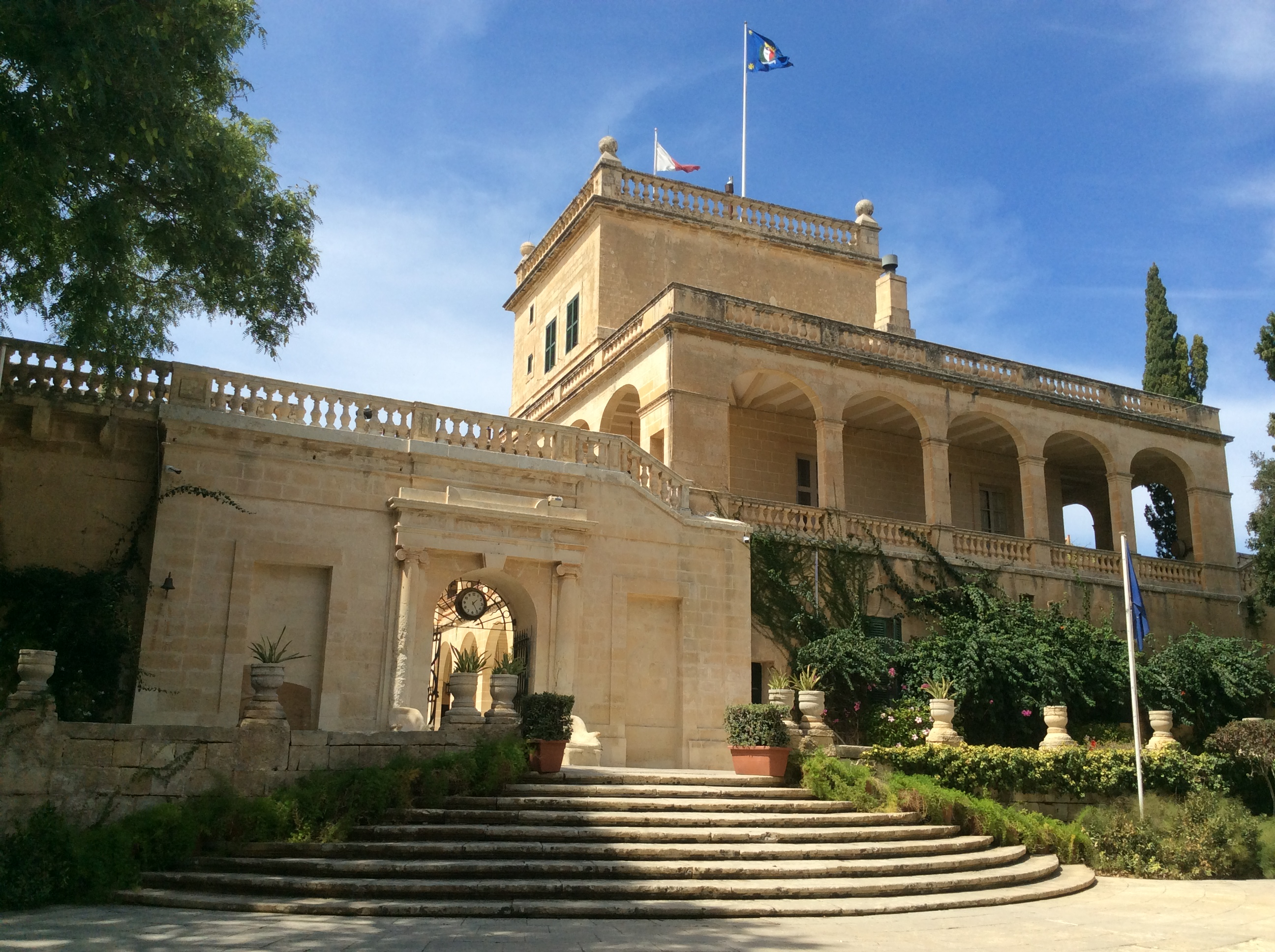
- San Anton Palace
- Interactive map of the San Anton Palace area

General information
- Status: Intact
- Type: Palace
- Location: Attard, Malta
- Coordinates: 35°53′47″N 14°26′48″E
- Current tenants: President of Malta
- Named for: Anthony of Padua
- Construction started: c. 1600
- Completed: c. 1625
- Renovated: 18th–19th centuries
- Client: Antoine de Paule
- Owner: Government of Malta

Technical details
- Material: Limestone

San Anton Palace (Maltese: Il-Palazz Sant'Anton) is a palace in Attard, Malta, that currently serves as the official residence of the president of Malta. It was originally built in the early 17th century as a country villa for Antoine de Paule, a knight of the Order of St. John. It was expanded into a palace following de Paule's election as Grand Master in 1623.

The palace was used as a residence by subsequent Grand Masters, being enlarged a number of times in the process. It was the headquarters of the rebel National Assembly during the uprising of 1798–1800, and it later became a residence for the civil commissioners, governors and governors-general of Malta. It was often used by British sovereigns and other royalty during their stay in Malta. It has been the official residence of the president since the office was created in December 1974.

The palace is surrounded by the extensive San Anton Gardens, parts of which have been open to the public since 1882.

== History ==
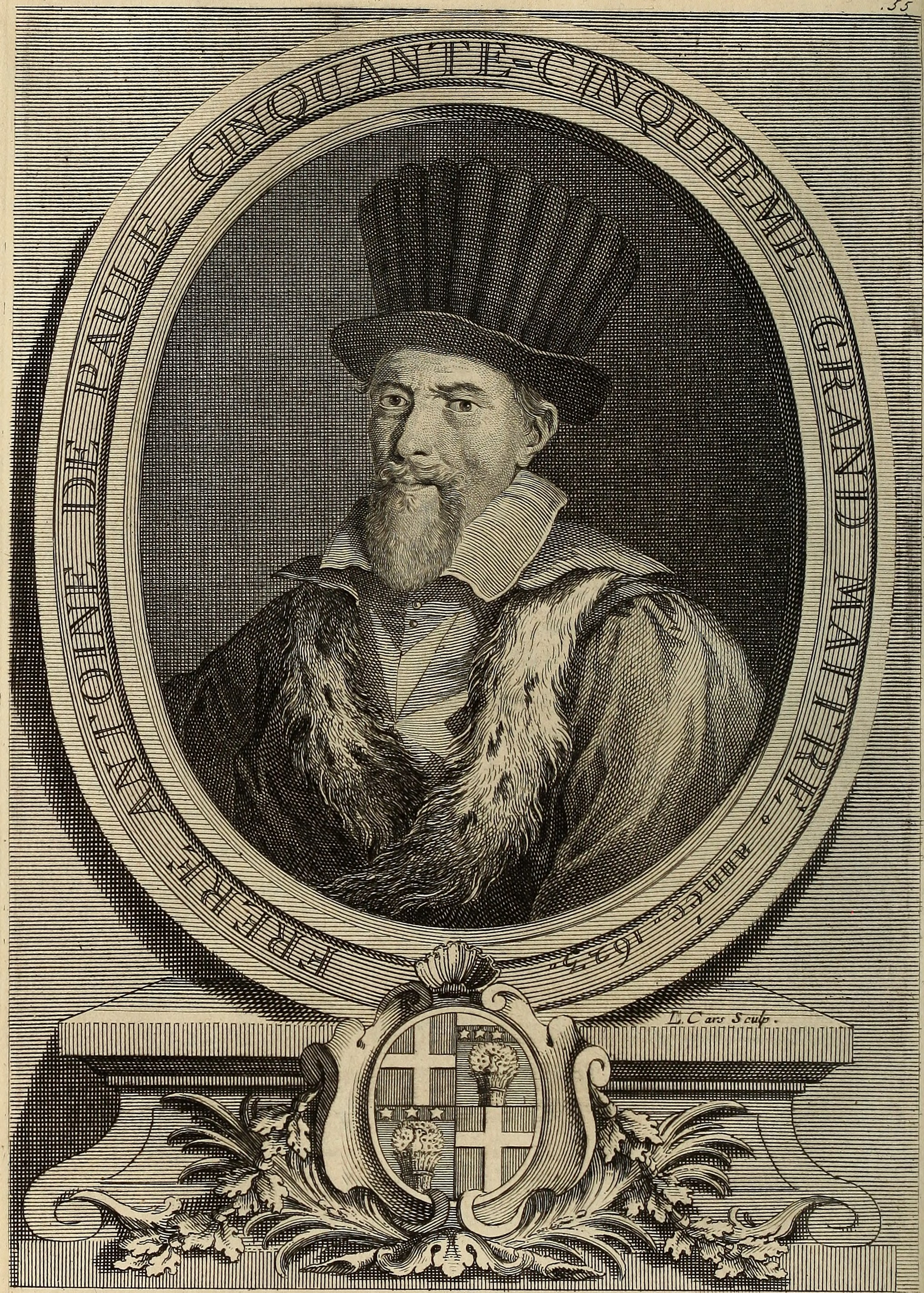
Grand Master Antoine de Paule, who first built the palace in the early 17th century

In around 1600, Antoine de Paule, a knight of the Order of St. John from the Langue of Provence, acquired a piece of land in Attard and built a country villa. De Paule was elected Grand Master in 1623, and the villa was subsequently enlarged into a palace in around 1625. The palace was named San Anton after the Grand Master's patron saint, Anthony of Padua.

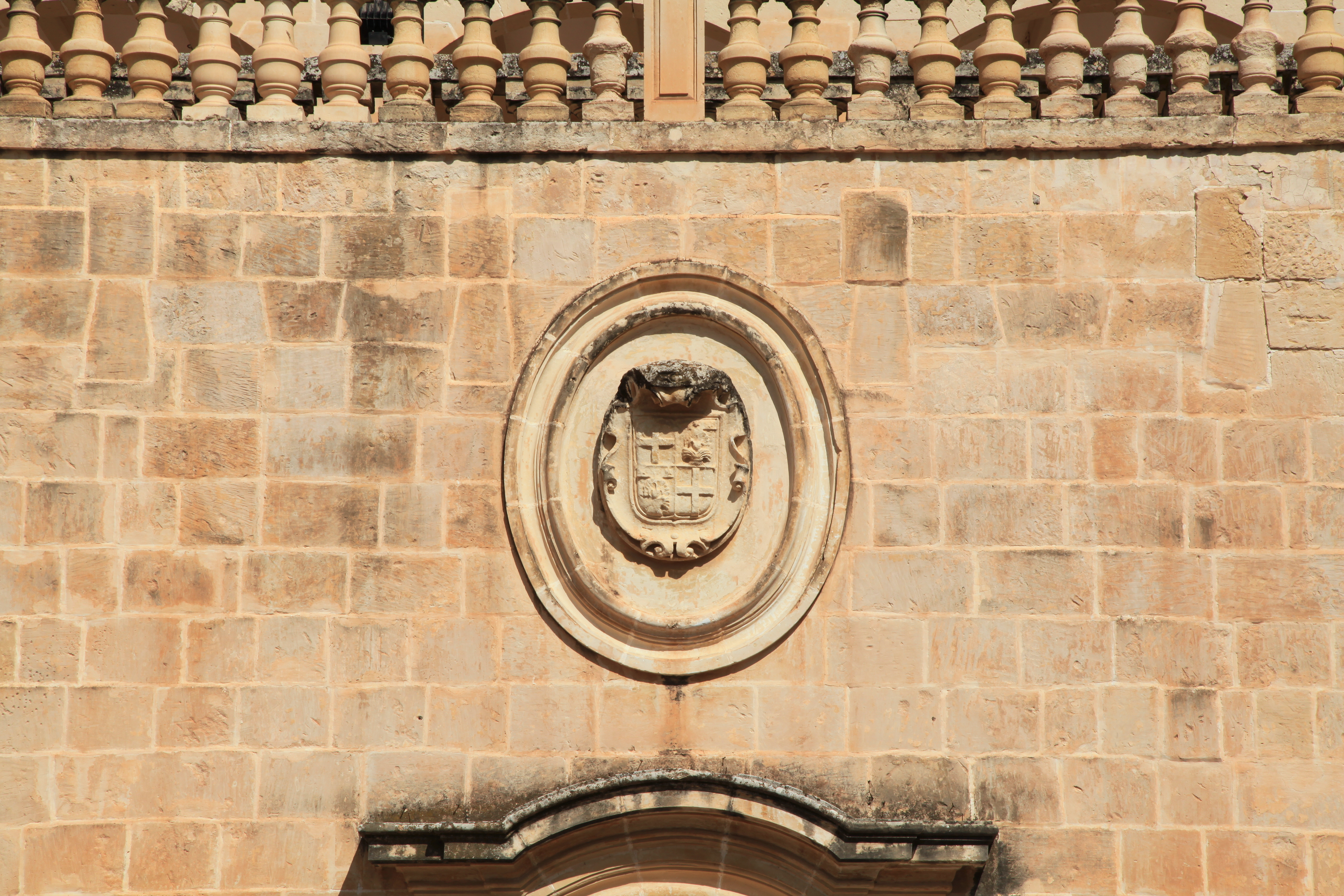
Coat of arms of Antoine de Paule at the palace

De Paule planned the villa on generous proportions to provide accommodation for his guests and his large domestic staff which included cooks, food tasters, torch bearers, pantry boys, wig makers, a winder of the clocks, physicians, as well as a baker to make black bread for feeding his hunting dogs.

Following de Paule's death in 1636, the palace remained in use as a residence by subsequent Grand Masters of the Order, since it was closer to the capital city Valletta than the Verdala Palace. Over the years, the building was expanded from having a T-shape into a Latin cross.

During the French occupation of Malta and the subsequent Maltese uprising, the palace was the meeting place of the rebel National Assembly, which first met on 11 February 1799. In 1800, the palace became the residence of the first British civil commissioner, Admiral Sir Alexander Ball, who died at the palace in October 1809.

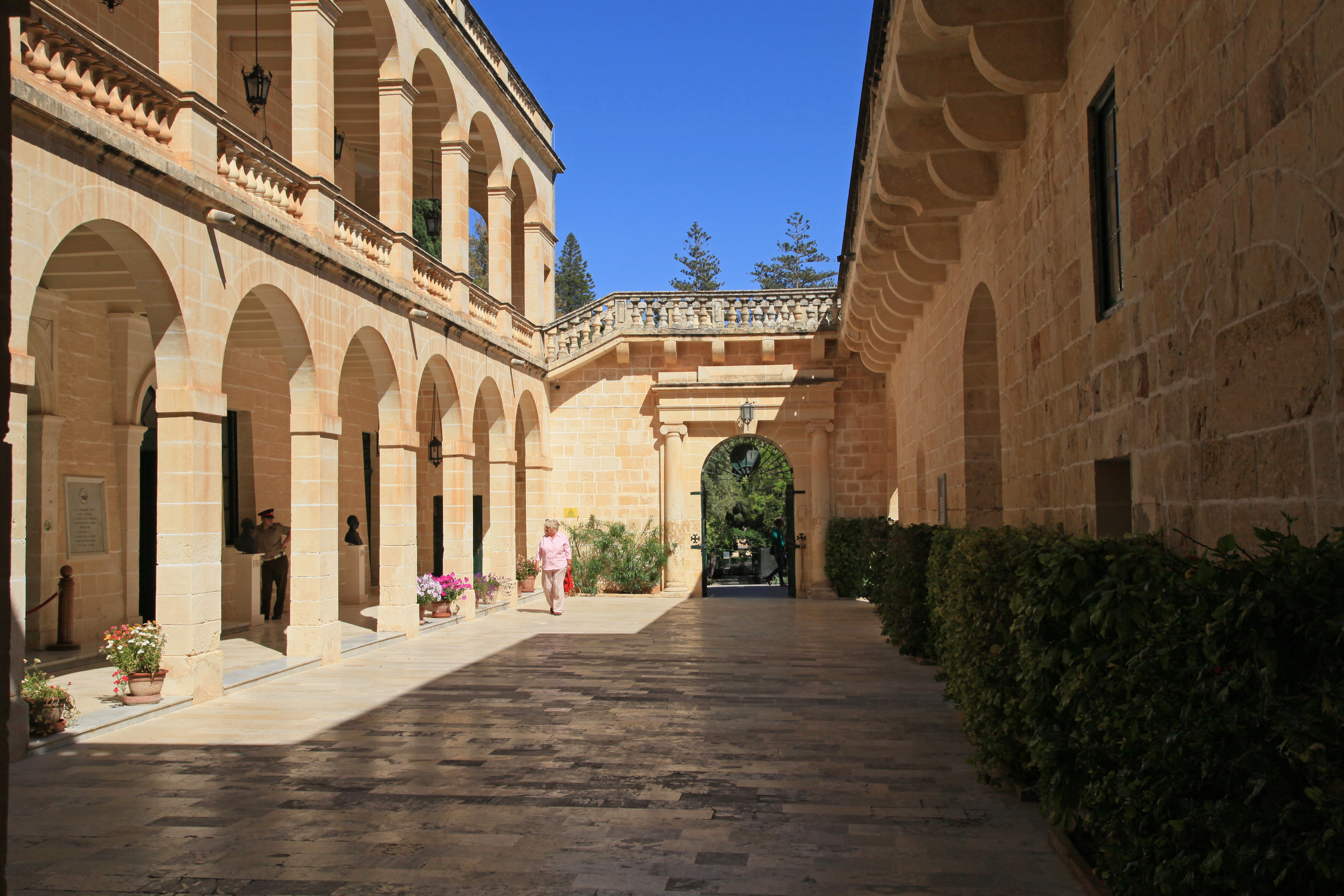
Courtyard at San Anton Palace

The palace subsequently became the official residence of the governor and, later, governor-general of Malta. Some structural changes were made during British rule, including a reduction of the height of the tower after it was hit by lightning in 1819, and the addition of a balustraded walk around the main courtyard. Parts of the palace's gardens were opened to the public in 1882. San Anton has been the official residence of the president of Malta since the island became a republic in December 1974.

Princess Victoria Melita of Saxe-Coburg and Gotha was born at the palace on 25 November 1876, when her father Alfred, Duke of Saxe-Coburg and Gotha, was stationed in Malta as a Royal Navy officer.

Queen Elizabeth II stayed at the palace during her royal visits to Malta in 1954, 1967 and 2005.

The palace and its gardens were included on the Antiquities List of 1925. It is now a Grade 1 national monument, and it is also listed on the National Inventory of the Cultural Property of the Maltese Islands.

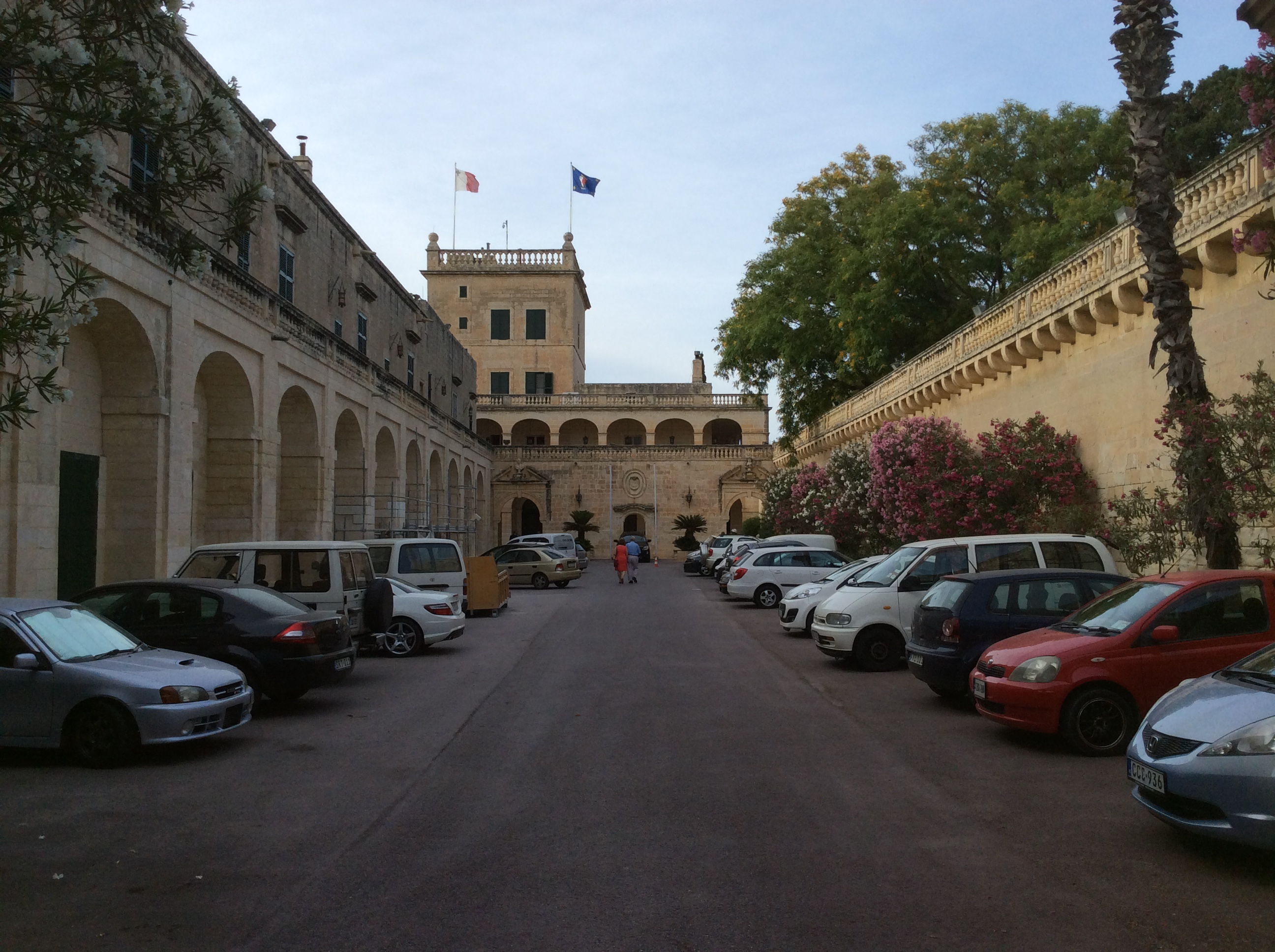
Car park at San Anton Palace, with the wall that collapsed in October 2018 on the right

On 17 October 2018 a 50-metre-long (160 ft) stretch of a historic wall forming part of the palace collapsed. There were no injuries. Emergency work was undertaken to conserve the remaining part of the wall, which had been restored a few months before.

== Architecture ==
San Anton Palace is a two-storey building, with a high square tower which has panoramic views of the surrounding area.

=== Chapels ===
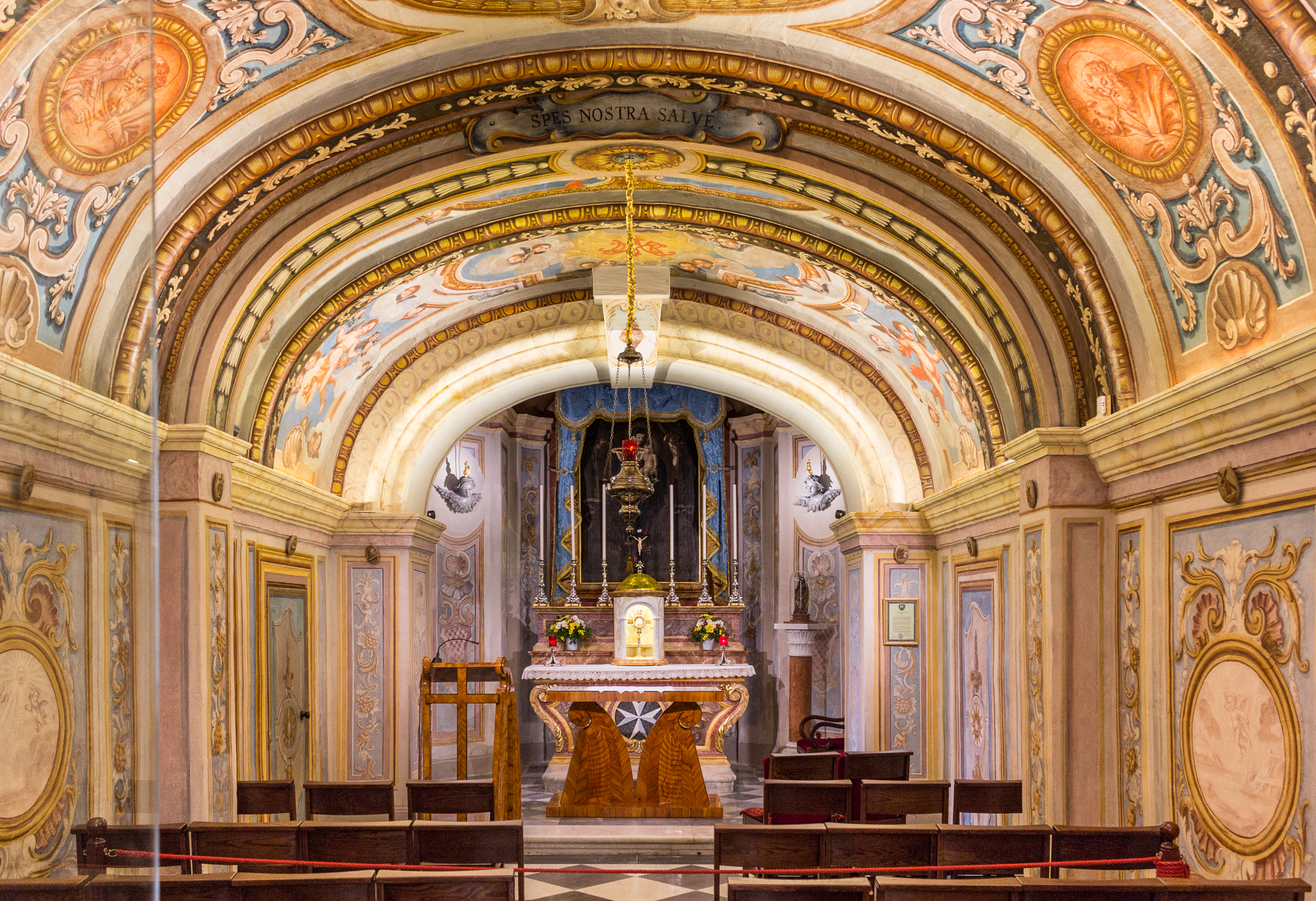
Interior of the Chapel of Our Lady of Pilar

San Anton Palace contains two chapels, one dedicated to Our Lady of Pilar and another dedicated to St. Anthony. The Chapel of Our Lady of Pilar was built by Grand Master António Manoel de Vilhena in the 18th century. It consists of a barrel-vaulted nave, with ribs dividing the ceiling into six bays. The vault is decorated with the coats of arms of de Vilhena, and subsequent Grand Masters Manuel Pinto da Fonseca and Emmanuel de Rohan-Polduc. The altar is set within a chancel separated from the nave by pilasters.

The Chapel of St. Anthony, which is also known as the Russian Chapel, was built in the 19th century as a Protestant chapel. It was later converted to a Russian Orthodox chapel to accommodate Grand Duchess Maria Alexandrovna of Russia, the wife of Alfred, Duke of Saxe-Coburg and Gotha. It is larger than the Chapel of Our Lady of Pilar. The chapel's denomination is now Roman Catholic, and it was restored in 2013.

== Gardens ==
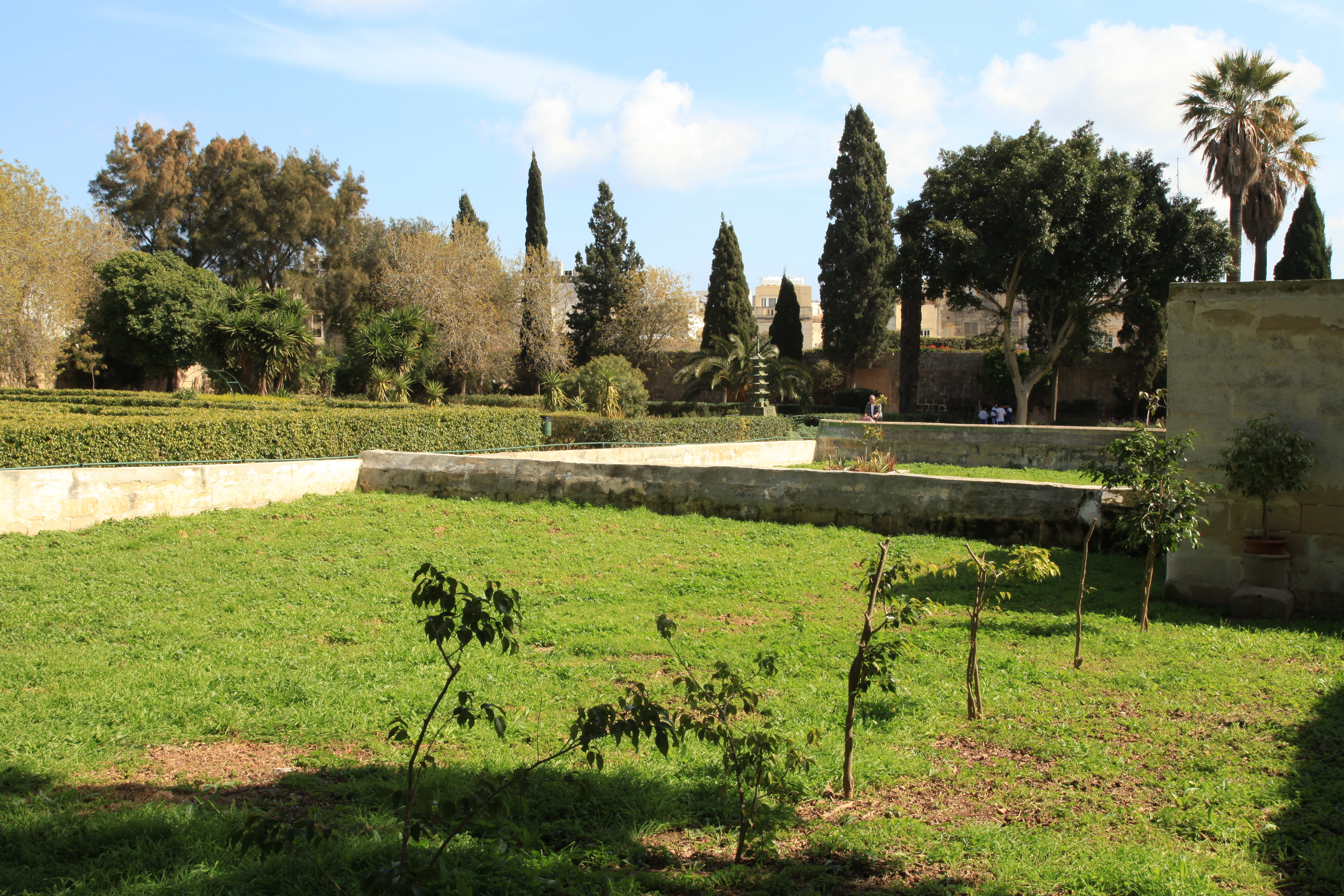
San Anton Gardens

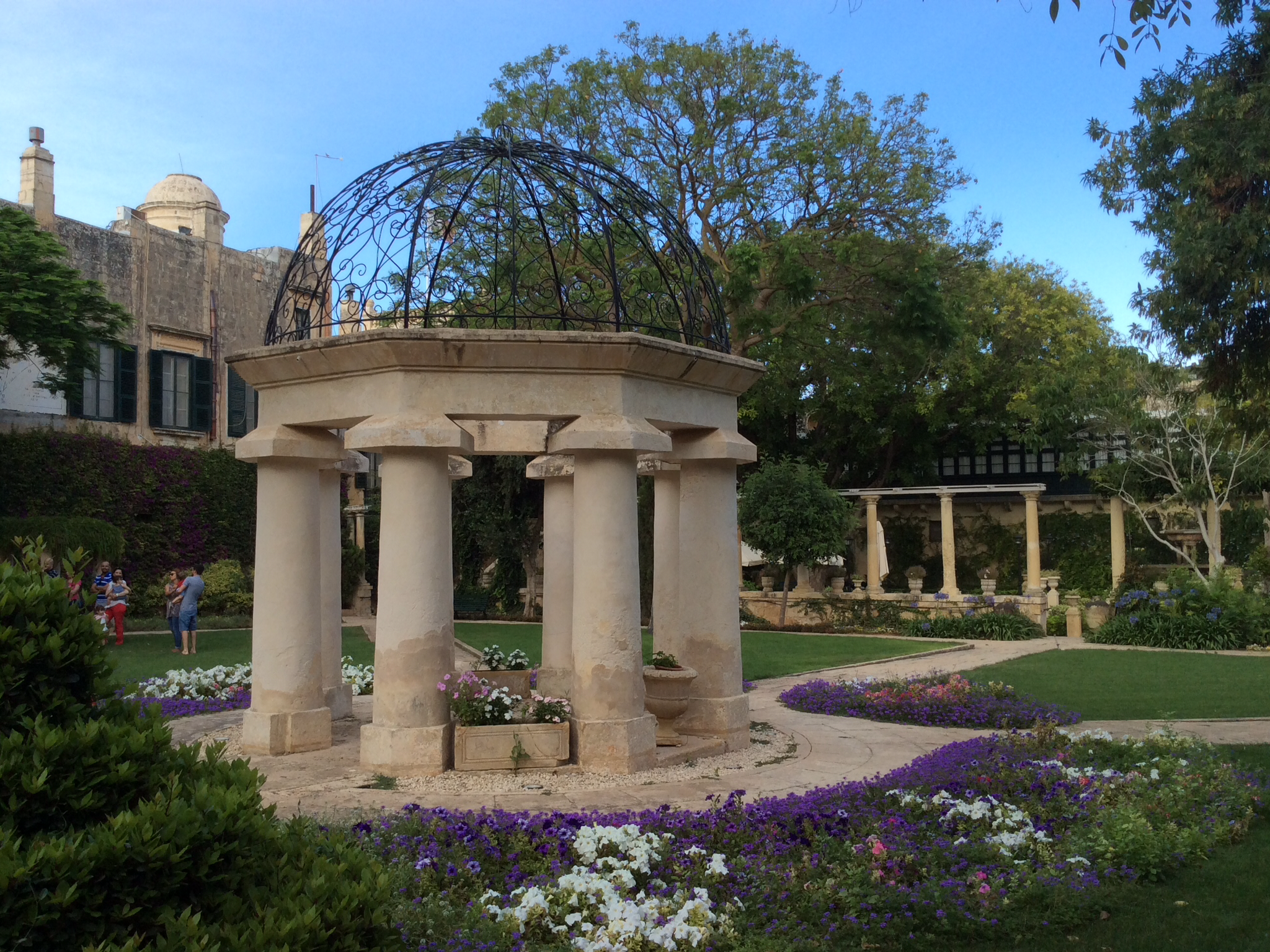
The President's Secret Garden, one of the two private gardens that is occasionally open to the public

San Anton Gardens are laid out in a formal manner, with graceful walkways, sculptures, ornamental ponds with ducks, swans and turtles, and a small aviary. The gardens contain a number of fountains, one decorated with a statue relocated from Argotti Gardens.

The gardens contain a large variety of trees and flowers from around the world, including a variety of palm trees, cypress, jacarandas, araucarias and other exotic plants, some of them over three centuries old. For many years it has been customary for visiting heads of state to plant a tree in memory of their stay in Malta. The gardens also contain an orangery, and it was once the practice of incumbent governors to give baskets of oranges grown in the palace gardens as gifts at Christmas time.

Parts of the gardens were first opened to the public in the early 19th century by Admiral Sir Alexander Ball. They were enriched by General The 1st Marquess of Hastings, the second governor of Malta, in the 1820s. Lord Hastings, an Anglo-Irish aristocrat, had previously served as the governor-general of India. The gardens were reopened to the public in 1882.

== Events ==
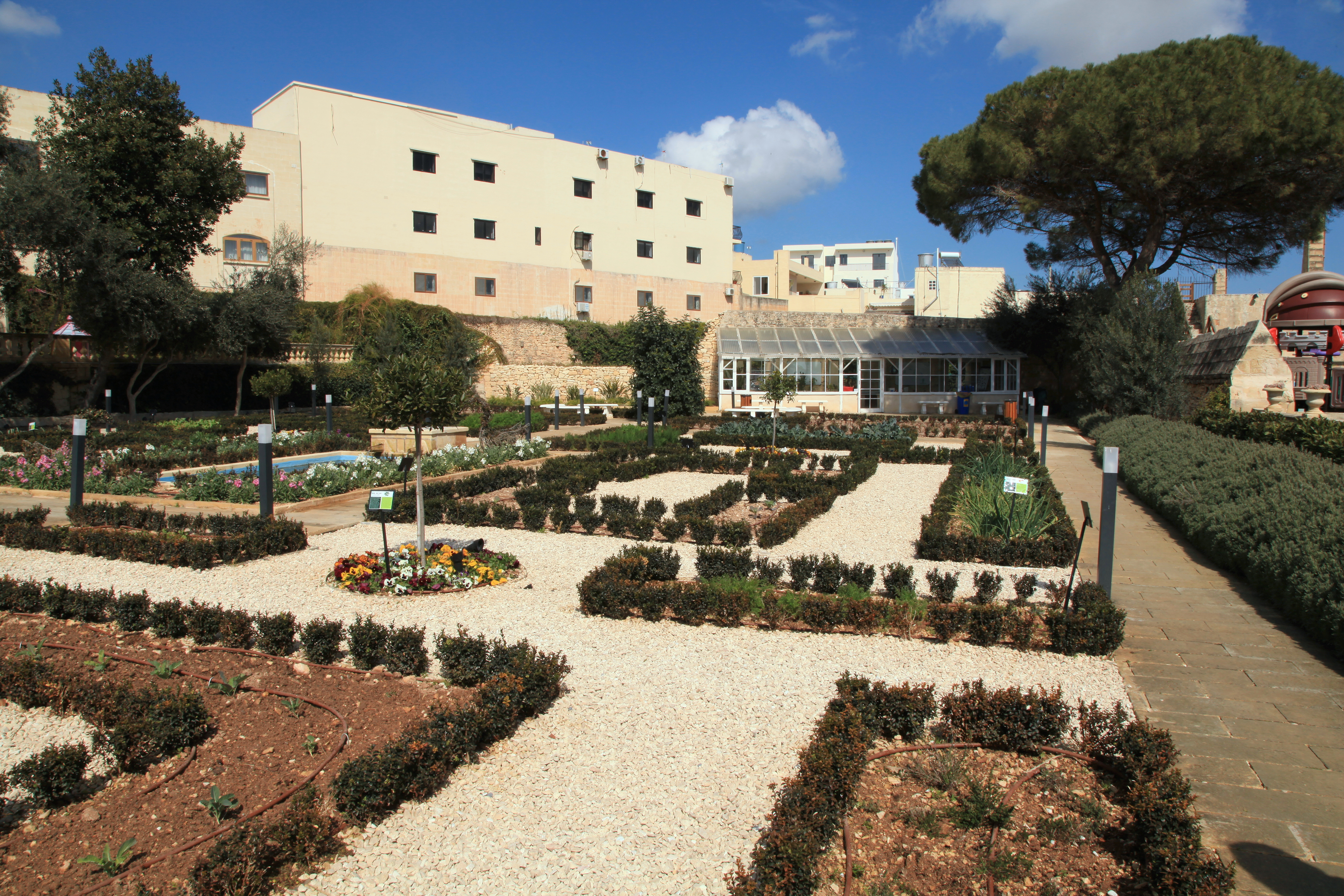
President's Kitchen Garden

A number of events are held at San Anton Palace, including the annual Horticultural Spring Show. The Malta Community Chest Fund, a charitable organization headed by the president, also occasionally holds fund-raising events at the palace.

The President's Kitchen Garden is located across the street from San Anton Palace, close to Villa Bologna. While not being physically part of the palace, it is part of the property of the palace and under the president of Malta. It offers a privately contracted food retreat, and profits go to the Malta Community Chest Fund.

== Legacy ==
San Anton Palace and its gardens probably influenced subsequent Grand Masters to build their own residences and gardens, such as Giovanni Paolo Lascaris, who built Ġnien is-Sultan in Valletta, and António Manoel de Vilhena, who built Casa Leoni in Santa Venera.
