= Alexander Ball =

Royal Navy officer and colonial administrator (1757–1809)

Rear-Admiral Sir Alexander Ball Bt
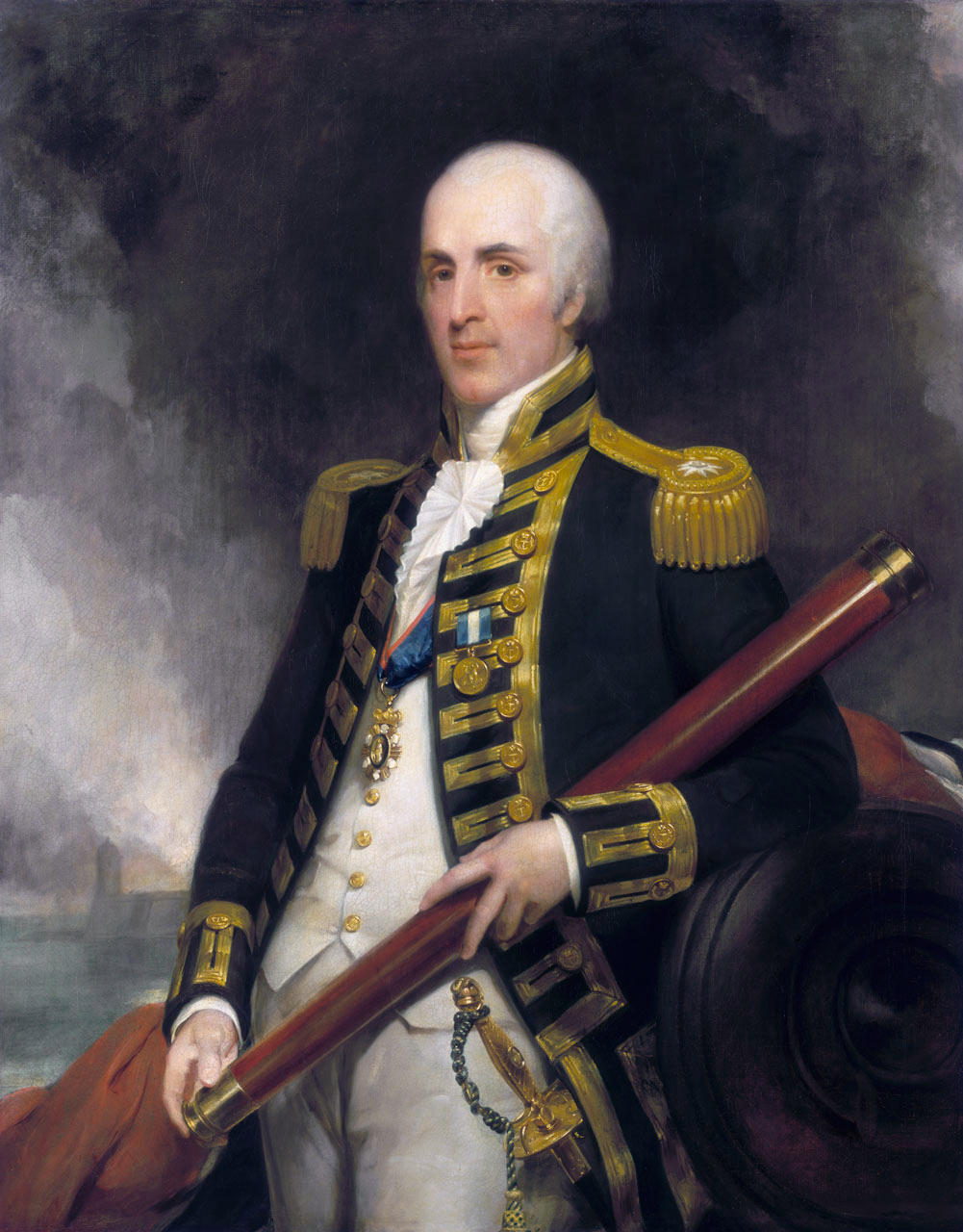
- Portrait by Henry William Pickersgill, 1805–1809
- Born: 22 July 1757; Sheepscombe, Gloucestershire
- Died: 25 October 1809 (aged 52); San Anton Palace, Malta
- Military career
- Allegiance: Great Britain; United Kingdom
- Branch: Royal Navy
- Service years: 1778–1809
- Rank: Rear-Admiral of the Red
- Conflicts: American Revolutionary War; Battle of the Saintes; French Revolutionary Wars; Battle of the Nile; Siege of Malta (1798–1800)

Rear-Admiral Sir Alexander John Ball, 1st Baronet (Italian: Alessandro Giovanni Ball, 22 July 1757 – 25 October 1809) was a Royal Navy officer and colonial administrator who served as the civil commissioner of Malta from 1799 to 1801 and again from 1802 to 1809. He was born in Ebworth Park in Sheepscombe, Gloucestershire. He was the fourth son of Robert and Mary (Dickinson) Ball and the younger brother of Ingram Ball.

== Early naval experience ==
Ball entered the Royal Navy, and on 7 August 1778, was promoted lieutenant. Three years later he began a close association with Sir George Rodney. Ball was promoted commander on 14 April 1782, two days after his chief's crowning victory, and took command of Germaine. On 20 March 1783 he became captain. With peace restored, Ball was furloughed on half-pay. He then spent a year in France, hoping to learn the language and live economically. Captain Horatio Nelson was at this time by no means favourably impressed by his future friend and comrade, and described Ball as a "great coxcomb".

In 1790, Ball received a command and from then on he was continuously employed. In May 1798, Ball commanded HMS Alexander in the Mediterranean. Once when Nelson's HMS Vanguard had lost her fore- and topmasts, Ball towed Vanguard to Sardinia. Under Nelson's command, Ball took part in the Battle of the Nile, and his ship, the Alexander, was the second British ship to fire on the French Admiral's flagship, L’Orient, which later blew up during the battle.

== Alexander Ball and Malta ==
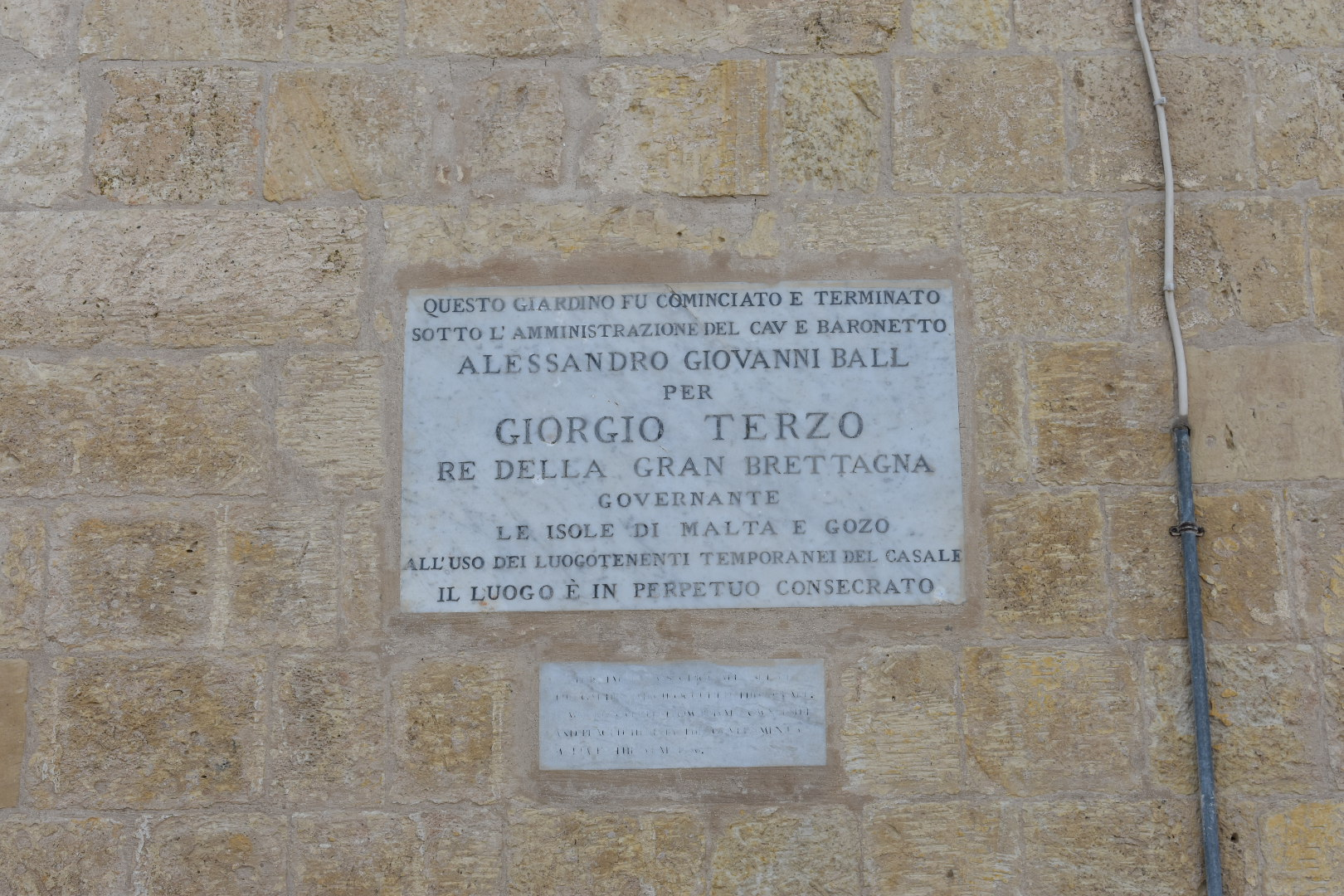
Inscription from a former early 19th-century garden in Żabbar making reference to Ball

Alexander Ball was an important figure in the diplomatic and military events that brought Malta under British rule. Universally loved by the Maltese, Ball visited the islands for the first time on 12 October 1798. Whenever Ball appeared in public, the passers-by in the streets stood uncovered until he had passed; the clamours of the market-place were hushed at his entrance and then exchanged for shouts of joy and welcome. His mission was to sustain and continue the siege and blockade of the French forces in Malta, aided by certain Portuguese naval forces.

The Maltese leaders of the blockade were immediately attracted by Ball's charisma and sympathy. Moreover, they might have realised that after the eventual French surrender, their island would have to find another ruler, since no Maltese in the nineteenth-century considered independence. The fear of the return of the increasingly oppressive Order of St. John may have pushed Malta indirectly toward becoming a British protectorate. In a letter sent by one of the Maltese leaders to Ball, written by Vincenzo Borg, the Maltese expressed the wish to Ball that the vast majority of us wish to see the islands fall under English jurisdiction.

The destiny of Malta was to be decided by the events occurring in Europe during this period. Napoleon's troops succeeded in entering Naples itself, forcing King Ferdinand IV to flee the city with his family. For the Maltese this meant that only Britain could guarantee Malta's safety. It was at this stage that problems emerged between the supporters of the Neapolitans and those preferring the Royal Navy. Captain Alexander Ball succeeded in calming the situation, and this led to his eventual election as the President of the National Assembly that took place on 9 February 1799. According to Ball's wishes, the Assembly changed its name to National Congress in order to emphasise the need for a compromise. However, the increasingly precarious situation faced by King Ferdinand IV made Ball pass more powers to the British forces stationed in and around Malta. In fact, it was at this time that the Union Flag was flown for the first time alongside the Neapolitan flag.

Nelson wrote to Ball in January 1799:

"...Respecting the situation of Malta with the King of Naples, it is this – he is the legitimate Sovereign of the Island: therefore, I am of opinion his Flag should fly. At the same time, a Neapolitan garrison would betray it to the first man who would bribe him. I am sure the King would have no difficulty in giving his Sovereignty to England; and I have lately, with Sir William Hamilton, got a Note that Malta should never be given to any Power without the consent of England.... "P.S. – In case of the Surrender of Malta, I beg you will not do anything which can hurt the feelings of their Majesties. Unite their Flag with England’s, if it cannot, from the disposition of the Islanders, fly alone."

The French forces besieged in Valletta faced starvation as the British navy intercepted a French relief force off Lampedusa Island. Eventually, General Vaubois, the commander of the French forces, surrendered to the British forces, represented by Captain George Martin and Major General Henry Pigot. As a representative of the Maltese people, Ball was not allowed to take part in the negotiations, while the Neapolitans were excluded for diplomatic reasons. The French were allowed to leave with full military honours, and after a few days Ball and the Maltese could enter the liberated capital.

In February 1801 Ball was appointed commissioner of the navy at Gibraltar and had to leave Malta. Control passed to Major General Henry Pigot, whose tyrannical administration angered the Maltese, a fact noted in a letter Ball wrote to Nelson in June of the same year. Ball reported that the Maltese would have rebelled against Pigot had Ball not promised them that he would convey their grievances to the authorities.

Nelson himself wrote back to Ball from the Baltic on 4 June 1801:

"My dear, invaluable friend,... believe me, my heart entertains the very warmest affection for you, and it has been no fault of mine, and not a little mortification, that you have not the red ribbon and other rewards that would have kept you afloat; but as I trust the war is at an end, you must take your flag when it comes to you, for who is to command our fleets in a future war?... I pity the poor Maltese; they have sustained an irreparable loss in your friendly counsel and an able director in their public concerns; you were truly their father, and, I agree with you, they may not like stepfathers.... Believe me at all times and places, for ever your sincere, affectionate, and faithful friend."

The British were uncertain of their policy towards Malta, as with Napoleon on the rise they could not afford problems with their allies. The choice of Charles Cameron as civil commissioner of Malta in May 1801 did not remove these uncertainties, even though his presence assured the Maltese of the protection of the British Empire. When the Treaty of Amiens placed Malta again under the rule of the Knights Hospitaller, this assurance was dashed.

Ball was made a baronet on 6 June 1801. The British government then sent him back to Malta as the Plenipotentiary Minister of His British Majesty for the Order of Saint John to coordinate the departure of the British in accordance with the provisions of the Treaty of Amiens. The situation, however, changed quickly as the likelihood of war between France and the United Kingdom increased. Ball now received instructions to delay the evacuation of British troops from the island.

Napoleon was anxious for the moment to see the British out of the Grand Harbour, stating that he would prefer to see the British in possession of a Parisian suburb than of Malta. In May 1803 war was rejoined because of the British refusal to evacuate the islands. During the Napoleonic Wars, through the 1814 Treaty of Paris, as ratified by the Congress of Vienna, Malta and all its dependencies passed under the jurisdiction of the British.

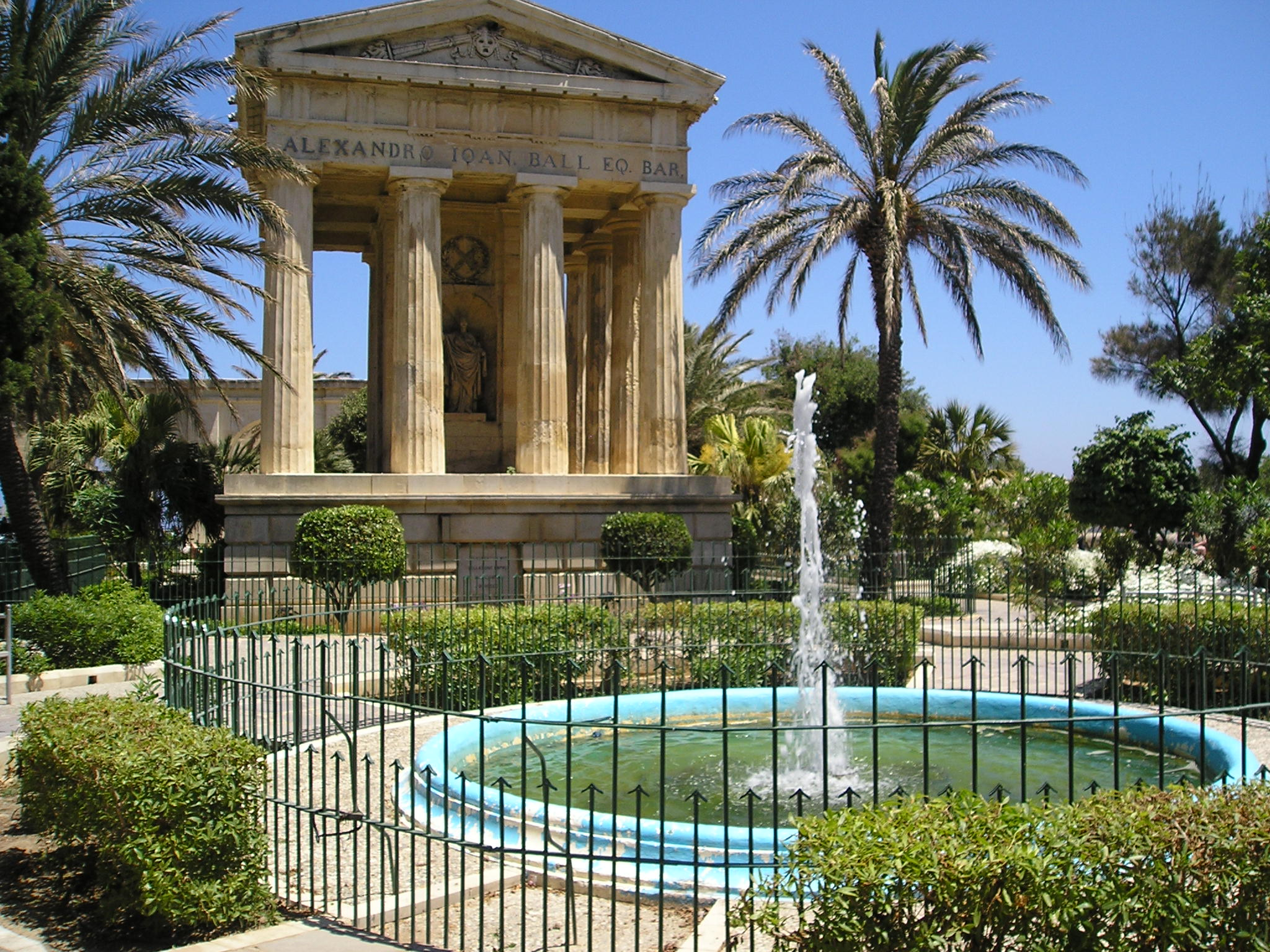
Monument to Sir Alexander Ball in the Lower Barrakka Gardens

Sir Alexander Ball was possibly the British leader most loved by the Maltese population. Samuel Taylor Coleridge became an assistant to Ball in 1804 and later described his administration in The Friend, going as far as describing Ball as "a truly great man". Ball died in the San Anton Palace on 25 October 1809 and was buried in Fort Saint Elmo in Valletta. In 1810, the Maltese built a monument in the Lower Barrakka Gardens dedicated to Ball's memory. This neoclassical monument was restored in 1884, and again in 2001.

== Flag rank appointments ==
Included:

- 9 November 1805, Rear-Admiral of the Blue
- 28 April 1808, Rear-Admiral of the White
- 25 October 1809, Rear-Admiral of the Red (Appointed in London the day he died in Malta.)

== Arms ==
Coat of arms of Ball of Blofield
Crest Out of a naval crown a cubit arm erect in naval uniform grasping a hand grenade fired in cross all Proper. Escutcheon Ermine, a lion rampant Sable, armed and langued Gules, between two torteaux in chief and in base a hand-grenade exploding Proper.

== Notes ==
Political offices
New post	Civil commissioner of Malta; 1799–1801	Succeeded by Sir Henry Pigot
Preceded by Charles Cameron	Civil commissioner of Malta; 1802–1809	Succeeded by Sir Hildebrand Oakes
Baronetage of the United Kingdom
New creation	Baronet (of Blofield); 1801–1809	Succeeded by William Keith Ball
