= John Carnes =

Privateer of Massachusetts

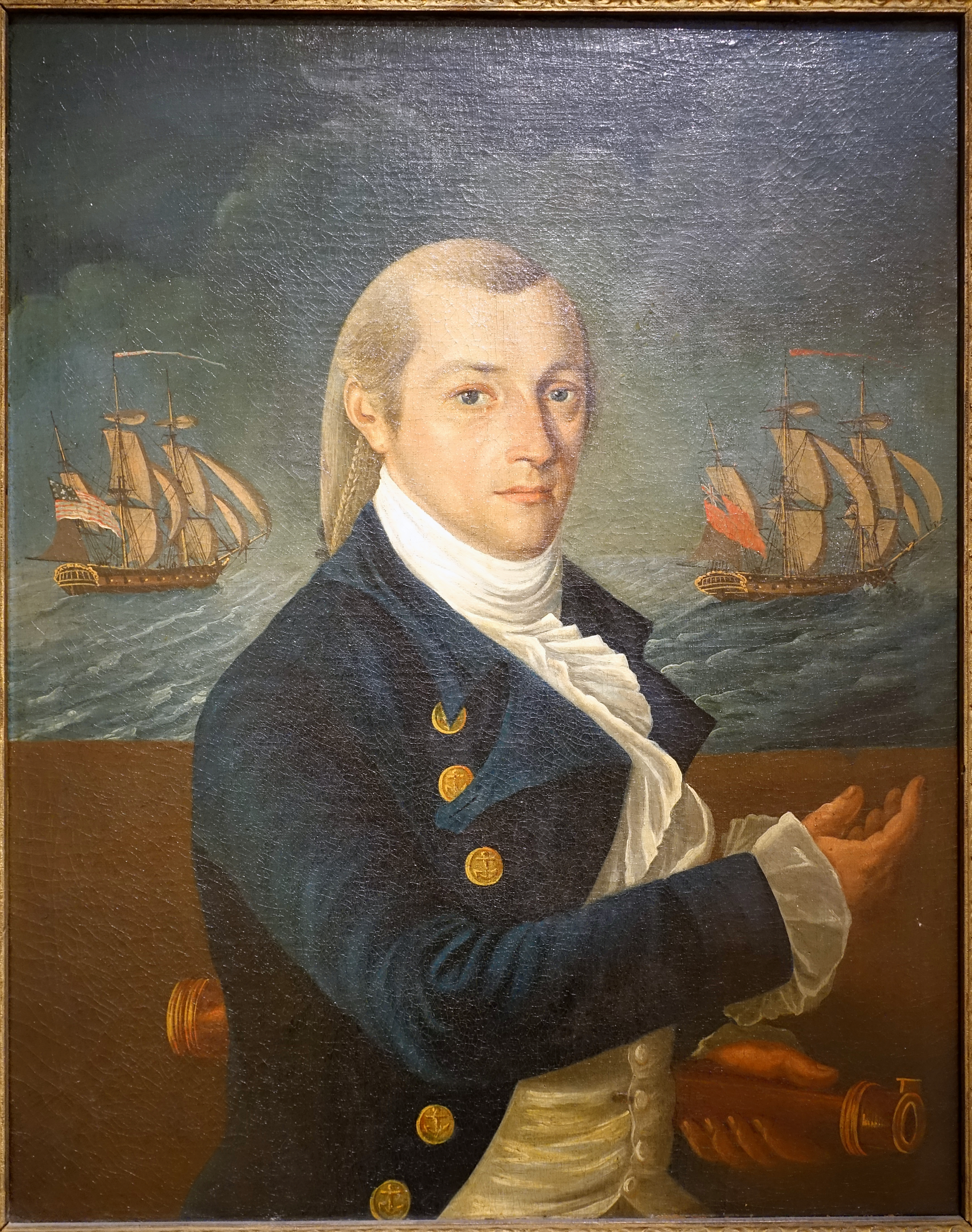
Captain John Carnes, by William Verstille, c. 1800, Peabody Essex Museum

Captain John Carnes of Salem, Massachusetts (c. 1756–1796), was a privateer.

He served as the captain of the General Lincoln and carried letters for John Adams. He held a letter of marque from the fledgling American government to harass, sink or capture British and allied shipping.

He served as captain of the privateer Porus, at least from 1781 when he sailed in company with Captain Samuel Tucker of the Thorn. Carnes led an expedition of four privateer vessels against the British-held island of Tortola, but with disappointing results. The plan to surprise the island was discovered and failing that the expedition, after some hot exchanges of cannon fire with pursued shipping, withdrew due to a British squadron being alerted to their presence in the area.

He later brought back the first shipload of pepper bought directly from the natives of the Dutch Spice Islands and, thus, opened the way to that trade in America and made a fortune in the process.

== Legacy ==
His portrait hangs in the Salem Historical Society Museum. His grandson was Alonzo Howard Clark of Washington D.C.. Alonzo fought in the civil war as a thirteen year old volunteer from Massachusetts. Alonzo's son was attorney Chester Morrow Clark also of D.C. and his gear grandson was Bradford Clark of Bronxville, New York, an veteran of the World War Two Campaign in the Pacific in the Americal Division of the United States Army. Bradford had three sons. One of whom wrote a Memoir of Bradford entitled "The all of it."

== Citations and references ==
Citations

References

- Privateer, a narrative of a captain Beecham. http://www.theislandwiki.org/index.php/A_privateer%27s_tale
- Elias Hasket Derby and his Times. https://books.google.com/books?id=yKweAQAAMAAJ&dq=captain+jonathan+carnes&pg=PA185
- https://books.google.com/books?id=yKweAQAAMAAJ&dq=captain+jonathan+carnes&pg=PA185
