= Henry Pigot =

General Sir Henry Pigot GCMG
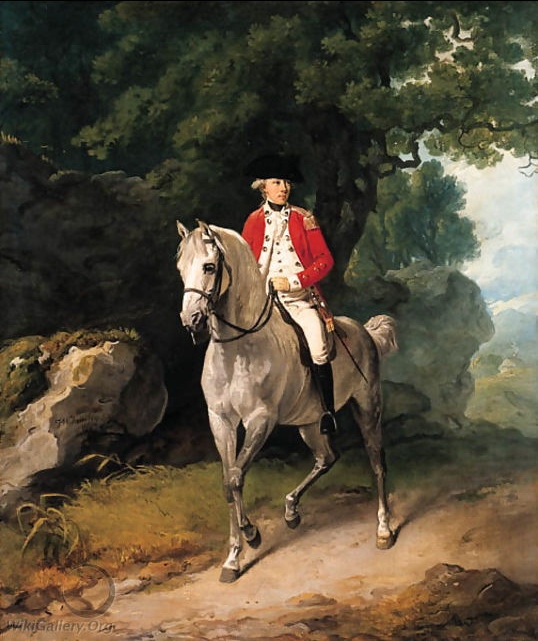
- Born: 1750
- Died: 7 June 1840 (aged 89–90); London
- Military career
- Allegiance: United Kingdom
- Branch: British Army
- Rank: General
- Awards: Knight Grand Cross of the Order of St Michael and St George

General Sir Henry Pigot GCMG (1750 – 7 June 1840) was a British Army officer.

== Military career ==
Born the son of Admiral Hugh Pigot, Pigot was commissioned as a cornet in 1769. He served in the Netherlands in 1793 and, following the Siege of Malta, accepted the surrender of Valletta from the French forces under General Claude-Henri Belgrand de Vaubois in September 1800. He went on to be Civil Commissioner of Malta in February 1801. As civil commissioner, he accepted the demolition of the majority of the fortifications of Valletta, but this act was never done and the city walls survive largely intact to this day.

Pigot was colonel of the 82nd Regiment of Foot (1798–1836) and then of the 38th Regiment of Foot (1836–1840). He was promoted full general on 1 January 1812 and appointed a Knight Grand Cross of the Order of St Michael and St George in 1837.

Political offices
Preceded by Sir Alexander Ball	Civil Commissioner of Malta; February 1801 – July 1801	Succeeded by Charles Cameron
Military offices
Preceded by Sir Charles Greville	Colonel of the 38th (1st Staffordshire) Regiment of Foot; 1836–1840	Succeeded by Sir Jasper Nicolls
Preceded by James Stuart	Colonel of the 82nd (The Prince of Wales's Volunteers) Regiment of Foot; 1798–1836	Succeeded by Sir John Wilson
