= Charles Cameron (colonial administrator) =

British colonial governor (1766–1820)

- Born: 1766
- Died: 8 May 1828 (aged 61–62); Roydon, Norfolk
- Spouse: Margaret Hay (m. 1789)
- Children: 3, including Charles Hay Cameron

Charles Cameron (1766–1828) was Civil Commissioner of Malta and then Governor of the Bahamas.

== Career ==
Born the son of Donald Cameron and Mary Guy, Cameron became Civil Commissioner of Malta in 1801. He issued a proclamation to the Maltese people in July 1801 making it clear that he would uphold their laws and rights. He went on to be Governor of Bahamas in 1804 until his resignation in 1820. He was also a partner of Harley, Cameron & Company, a firm with shipping ventures in the East Indies.

== Personal life ==
In 1789 he married Lady Margaret Hay, daughter of James Hay, 15th Earl of Erroll; they had one son, Charles Hay Cameron, and two daughters. He died in Roydon, Norfolk on 26 June 1828.

Political offices
Preceded by Sir Henry Pigot	Civil Commissioner of Malta; 1801–1802	Succeeded by Sir Alexander Ball
Preceded by John Halkett	Governor of the Bahamas; 1804–1820	Succeeded by Lewis Grant
