= List of civil commissioners of Malta =

Civil Commissioner of Malta
- Coat of Arms of the Civil Commissioner of Malta

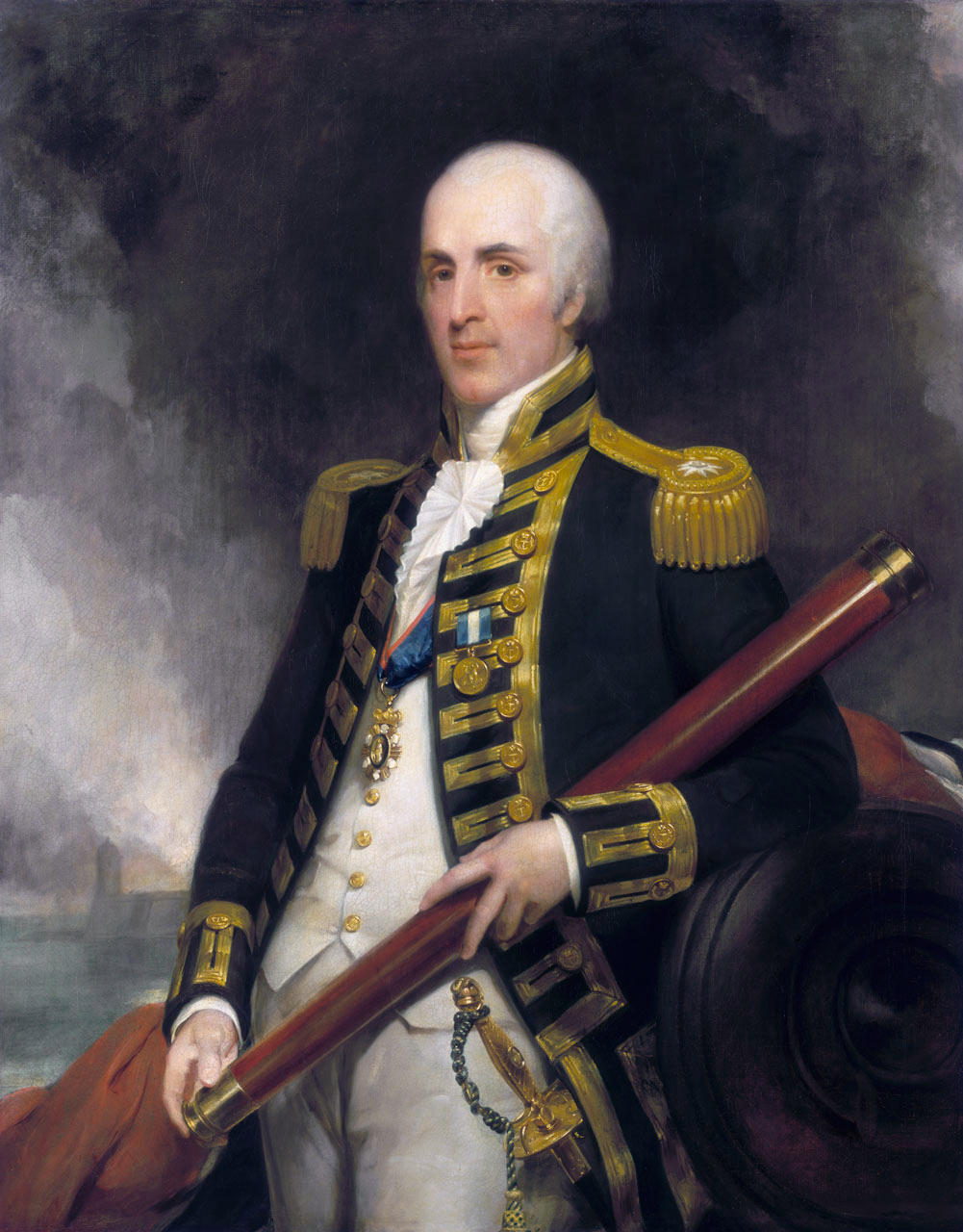
- Admiral Sir Alexander Ball
- Style: His Excellency
- Residence: Grandmaster's Palace in Valletta
- Appointer: King George III
- Precursor: French Military Governor of Malta
- Formation: 9 February 1799
- First holder: Sir Alexander Ball
- Final holder: Sir Hildebrand Oakes
- Abolished: 4 October 1813
- Succession: Governor of Malta

Flag of the United Kingdom

The Civil Commissioner of Malta (Maltese: Kummissarju Ċivili ta' Malta) was an official who ruled Malta during the French blockade and later the British protectorate period between 1799 and 1813. Upon the end of the Protectorate and the creation of the Crown Colony of Malta in 1813, this office was replaced by that of the governor, who represented the Government of the United Kingdom.

== List of civil commissioners (1799–1813) ==
Name (Birth–Death)	Portrait	From	To
Admiral; Sir Alexander Ball (1757–1809)		9 February 1799	February 1801
Sir Henry Pigot (1750–1840)		February 1801	July 1801
Charles Cameron (1766–1820)		July 1801	1802
Admiral; Sir Alexander Ball (1757–1809); Restored		1802	25 October 1809
Sir Hildebrand Oakes (1754–1822)		May 1810	4 October 1813

== See also ==
- List of governors of Malta
- Governor-General of Malta
