= List of monuments in Birkirkara =

This is a list of monuments in Birkirkara, Malta, which are listed on the National Inventory of the Cultural Property of the Maltese Islands. The list includes graded scheduled properties from the Malta Scheduled Property Register maintained by Malta's Planning Authority. The latter are denoted by an ID beginning with the letters MSPR.

== List ==
Name of object	Location	Coordinates	ID	Photo	Upload
Statue of the Sacred Heart of Jesus	"Sacred Heart", Triq L-Imsida	35°53′49″N 14°28′08″E	00200	Statue of the Sacred Heart of Jesus	Upload Photo
Statue of St Michael	Triq Mannarinu / Triq Paris	35°53′48″N 14°28′14″E	00201	Statue of St Michael	Upload Photo
Church of St Francis of Assisi	Triq L-Imsida	35°53′53″N 14°28′04″E	00202	Church of St Francis of Assisi	Upload Photo
Niche of the Madonna of Mount Carmel	3 Triq Paris	35°53′49″N 14°28′06″E	00203	Niche of the Madonna of Mount Carmel	Upload Photo
Niche of St Joseph	55 Triq il-Qasab	35°53′51″N 14°28′00″E	00204	Niche of St Joseph	Upload Photo
Niche of St Constantine	Villa Costantino, 59 Triq L-Imsida	35°53′52″N 14°27′59″E	00205	Niche of St Constantine	Upload Photo
Statue of St Joseph	188 Triq L-Imsida	35°53′52″N 14°27′58″E	00206	Statue of St Joseph	Upload Photo
Statue of St Helen	188-189 Triq L-Imsida	35°53′52″N 14°27′58″E	00207	Statue of St Helen	Upload Photo
Niche of the Pieta	Triq Sant'Elena / Triq L-Imsida	35°53′52″N 14°27′55″E	00208	Niche of the Pieta	Upload Photo
Statue of St Anthony	52 Triq Santu Rokku / 2 Triq Sant'Elena	35°53′54″N 14°27′53″E	00209	Statue of St Anthony	Upload Photo
Niche of St Paul	7-8 Triq Sant'Elena	35°53′54″N 14°27′53″E	00210	Niche of St Paul	Upload Photo
Niche of the Madonna of Sacro Cuor	Triq id-Dejqa / Triq Sant'Elena	35°53′53″N 14°27′53″E	00211	Niche of the Madonna of Sacro Cuor	Upload Photo
Niche of St Helen	7 Triq id-Dejqa	35°53′53″N 14°27′52″E	00212	Niche of St Helen	Upload Photo
Statue of the Assumption	Triq id-Dejqa / Triq San Guzepp	35°53′54″N 14°27′51″E	00213	Statue of the Assumption	Upload Photo
Statue of St Joseph	Triq id-Dejqa / Triq San Guzepp	35°53′54″N 14°27′51″E	00214	Statue of St Joseph	Upload Photo
Niche of the Madonna of Mount Carmel	44 Triq Santu Rokku	35°53′53″N 14°27′52″E	00215	Niche of the Madonna of Mount Carmel	Upload Photo
Niche of the Immaculate Conception	Triq Santu Rokku / Triq L-Imsida	35°53′51″N 14°27′52″E	00216	Niche of the Immaculate Conception	Upload Photo
Statue of St Vincent	Triq Santu Rokku / Triq L-Imsida	35°53′51″N 14°27′51″E	00217	Statue of St Vincent	Upload Photo
Niche of St Roque	189 Triq Santu Rokku	35°53′50″N 14°27′52″E	00218	Niche of St Roque	Upload Photo
Niche of St Michael	187 Triq Santu Rokku	35°53′50″N 14°27′51″E	00219	Niche of St Michael	Upload Photo
Niche of St Helen	Triq Santu Rokku / il-Qasab	35°53′47″N 14°27′52″E	00220	Niche of St Helen	Upload Photo
Niche of the Madonna of Mount Carmel	Sqaq il-Matluwa	35°53′57″N 14°27′56″E	00221	Niche of the Madonna of Mount Carmel	Upload Photo
Niche of the Immaculate Conception	Triq Santu Rokku / Sqaq Karla	35°53′58″N 14°27′57″E	00222	Niche of the Immaculate Conception	Upload Photo
Church of St Roque	Triq Santu Rokku	35°54′01″N 14°27′59″E	00223	Church of St Roque	Upload Photo
Niche of St Roque	Triq Santu Rokku	35°54′01″N 14°27′59″E	00224	Niche of St Roque	Upload Photo
Niche of the Madonna of Mount Carmel	7 Sqaq Sampusa	35°54′00″N 14°28′00″E	00225	Niche of the Madonna of Mount Carmel	Upload Photo
Niche of St Joseph	43 Sqaq Karla / Triq Santa Rita	35°53′57″N 14°27′59″E	00226	Niche of St Joseph	Upload Photo
Statue of St Helen	Triq M. Pulis / Pjazza Sant'Elena	35°53′58″N 14°27′56″E	00227	Statue of St Helen	Upload Photo
Niche of St Helen	8 Triq San Giljan	35°54′01″N 14°28′01″E	00228	Niche of St Helen	Upload Photo
Niche of the Madonna of Mount Carmel	16 Triq San Giljan	35°54′02″N 14°28′01″E	00229	Niche of the Madonna of Mount Carmel	Upload Photo
Niche of St Joseph	236 Triq San Giljan	35°54′02″N 14°28′02″E	00230	Niche of St Joseph	Upload Photo
Niche of the Holy Family	34/35 Triq San Giljan	35°54′04″N 14°28′03″E	00231	Niche of the Holy Family	Upload Photo
Niche of St Joseph	42 Triq San Giljan	35°54′04″N 14°28′05″E	00232	Niche of St Joseph	Upload Photo
Niche of the Madonna with Jesus	Sqaq il-Gharghar / Triq San Giljan	35°54′05″N 14°28′07″E	00233	Niche of the Madonna with Jesus	Upload Photo
Niche of the Assumption	248 Triq San Giljan	35°54′05″N 14°28′09″E	00234	Niche of the Assumption	Upload Photo
Parish Church of St Helen	Pjazza Sant'Elena	35°54′00″N 14°27′55″E	00235	Parish Church of St Helen	Upload Photo
Statue of the Immaculate Conception	Triq L-Ilsiera / Pjazza Sant'Elena	35°53′57″N 14°27′54″E	00236	Statue of the Immaculate Conception	Upload Photo
Niche of St Joseph	4 Triq M. Pullis	35°53′57″N 14°27′53″E	00237	Niche of St Joseph	Upload Photo
Church of St Anthony	Triq il-Kbira / Triq Sant'Elena	35°53′56″N 14°27′51″E	00238	Church of St Anthony	Upload Photo
Statue of St Paul	Triq San Guzepp / 118 Triq il-Kbira	35°53′55″N 14°27′51″E	00239	Statue of St Paul	Upload Photo
Niche of the Immaculate Conception	Police Station, 118 Triq il-Kbira	35°53′55″N 14°27′51″E	00240	Niche of the Immaculate Conception	Upload Photo
Niche of the Sacred Heart of Jesus	St Francis School, Triq L-Imnajjar	35°53′56″N 14°27′49″E	00241	Niche of the Sacred Heart of Jesus	Upload Photo
Relief of the Madonna	102 Triq il-Kbira	35°53′54″N 14°27′50″E	00242	Relief of the Madonna	Upload Photo
Relief of the Sacred Heart of Jesus	Triq il-Kbira / Triq Rigu	35°53′52″N 14°27′48″E	00243	Relief of the Sacred Heart of Jesus	Upload Photo
Statue of St Helen	51 Triq il-Kbira	35°53′51″N 14°27′48″E	00244	Statue of St Helen	Upload Photo
Niche of St Francis	Triq L-Imsida / Triq il-Kbira	35°53′50″N 14°27′47″E	00245	Niche of St Francis	Upload Photo
Relief of St Helen	260 Triq L-Imsida	35°53′50″N 14°27′48″E	00246	Relief of St Helen	Upload Photo
Niche of the Madonna of Mount Carmel	28 Triq Qrejzu	35°53′49″N 14°27′47″E	00247	Niche of the Madonna of Mount Carmel	Upload Photo
Niche of St Helen	33 Triq Qrejzu	35°53′49″N 14°27′48″E	00248	Niche of St Helen	Upload Photo
Niche of the Immaculate Conception (statue replaced by a statue St Joseph)	123 Triq il-Kbira / Sqaq Dun Perin	35°53′57″N 14°27′51″E	00249	Niche of the Immaculate Conception (statue replaced by a statue St Joseph)	Upload Photo
Niche of the Madonna of Mount Carmel	121 Triq il-Kbira / Sqaq Dun Perin	35°53′56″N 14°27′51″E	00250	Niche of the Madonna of Mount Carmel	Upload Photo
Niche of the Pieta	Sqaq Dun Perin	35°53′56″N 14°27′49″E	00251	Niche of the Pieta	Upload Photo
Relief of St Helen	142 Triq il-Kbira	35°53′57″N 14°27′52″E	00252	Relief of St Helen	Upload Photo
Niche of the Madonna of Mount Carmel	133-135 Triq il-Kbira	35°53′57″N 14°27′51″E	00253	Niche of the Madonna of Mount Carmel	Upload Photo
Statue of St Helen	185 Triq il-Kbira	35°54′00″N 14°27′52″E	00254	Statue of St Helen	Upload Photo
Statue of Christ the Redeemer	Triq il-Kbira / Triq Bwieraq	35°54′01″N 14°27′52″E	00255	Statue of Christ the Redeemer	Upload Photo
Niche of the Flagellation of Jesus	187 Triq il-Kbira	35°54′00″N 14°27′52″E	00256	Niche of the Flagellation of Jesus	Upload Photo
Niche of St John the Evangelist	Triq il-Kbira / Triq Bwieraq	35°54′01″N 14°27′52″E	00257	Niche of St John the Evangelist	Upload Photo
Statue of the Immaculate Conception	Pjazza San Frangisk	35°54′01″N 14°27′52″E	00258	Statue of the Immaculate Conception	Upload Photo
Niche of the Madonna of Mount Carmel	195 Triq il-Kbira	35°54′02″N 14°27′52″E	00259	Niche of the Madonna of Mount Carmel	Upload Photo
Niche of the Madonna tal-Ħerba	Sqaq Buzaqq	35°54′01″N 14°27′53″E	00260	Niche of the Madonna tal-Ħerba	Upload Photo
Niche of the Madonna of Mount Carmel	186 Triq il-Kbira	35°54′01″N 14°27′52″E	00261	Niche of the Madonna of Mount Carmel	Upload Photo
Niche of St Joseph	Triq San Kostantinu / Triq il-Kbira	35°54′02″N 14°27′52″E	00262	Niche of St Joseph	Upload Photo
Niche of the Pieta	31 Triq il-Kbira / Triq Has-Sajjied	35°54′03″N 14°27′50″E	00263	Niche of the Pieta	Upload Photo
Empty Niche	Triq Has-Sajjied	35°54′06″N 14°27′48″E	00264	Empty Niche	Upload Photo
Niche of the Crucifixion of Jesus	60 Triq il-Kbira	35°54′07″N 14°27′49″E	00265	Niche of the Crucifixion of Jesus	Upload Photo
Niche of the Immaculate Conception	Sqaq Nannuwa	35°54′07″N 14°27′50″E	00266	Niche of the Immaculate Conception	Upload Photo
Victory Church (Nativity of the Madonna)	Triq il-Vitorja	35°54′08″N 14°27′51″E	00267	Victory Church (Nativity of the Madonna)	Upload Photo
Niche of St Michael	9 Sqaq il-Vitorja	35°54′10″N 14°27′51″E	00268	Niche of St Michael	Upload Photo
Empty Niche	Sqaq Nru 1, Triq il-Vitorja	35°54′10″N 14°27′53″E	00269	Empty Niche	Upload Photo
Empty Niche	96 Triq il-Vitorja	35°54′08″N 14°27′50″E	00270	Empty Niche	Upload Photo
Niche of the Madonna of Mount Carmel	16 Triq il-Vitorja	35°54′09″N 14°27′52″E	00271	Niche of the Madonna of Mount Carmel	Upload Photo
Niche of St Helen	68 Triq il-Kbira	35°54′07″N 14°27′49″E	00272	Niche of St Helen	Upload Photo
Statue of St Paul	5 Triq Hal-Gharghur	35°54′09″N 14°27′47″E	00273	Statue of St Paul	Upload Photo
Niche of the Madonna of the Rosary	5 Triq Hal-Gharghur	35°54′09″N 14°27′47″E	00274	Niche of the Madonna of the Rosary	Upload Photo
Relief of St Francis of Assisi	Palazz Santa Liena, Triq Hal-Gharghur	35°54′10″N 14°27′48″E	00275	Relief of St Francis of Assisi	Upload Photo
Relief of St Mark	Palazz Santa Liena, Triq Hal-Gharghur	35°54′10″N 14°27′48″E	00276	Relief of St Mark	Upload Photo
Niche of St Joseph	Triq San Dwardu	35°54′08″N 14°27′47″E	00277	Niche of St Joseph	Upload Photo
Church of the Madonna tal-Ħerba	Triq Tal-Ħerba	35°54′04″N 14°27′54″E	00278	Church of the Madonna tal-Ħerba	Upload Photo
Relief of the Holy Family	"Sacred Family House", Triq tal-Ħabra	35°54′01″N 14°27′58″E	00279	Relief of the Holy Family	Upload Photo
Statue of the Sacred Heart of Jesus	14 Triq tal-Ħerba	35°54′03″N 14°27′53″E	00280	Statue of the Sacred Heart of Jesus	Upload Photo
Statue of St Helen	Triq is-Santwarju / Triq Santa Liena	35°53′59″N 14°27′53″E	00281	Statue of St Helen	Upload Photo
Church of Mary Help of Christians	Triq San Giljan	35°54′07″N 14°28′15″E	00282	Church of Mary Help of Christians	Upload Photo
Cross	Triq San Giljan / Industrial Estate	35°54′09″N 14°28′22″E	00283	Cross	Upload Photo
Niche of St Michael	Ta' Ganu Windmill, Triq in-Naxxar / Triq Bwieraq	35°54′00″N 14°27′21″E	00284	Niche of St Michael	Upload Photo
Statue of St Helen (only pedestal in place)	Triq in-Naxxar / Triq Piju XII	35°53′58″N 14°27′23″E	00285	Statue of St Helen (only pedestal in place)	Upload Photo
Church of St Alphonse	Triq il-Wied	35°53′50″N 14°27′30″E	00286	Church of St Alphonse	Upload Photo
Church of St Theresa of Lisieuz	Triq il-Wied	35°53′51″N 14°27′32″E	00287	Church of St Theresa of Lisieuz	Upload Photo
Statue of St Theresa of Avila	Triq il-Wied / Triq Santa Tereza	35°53′49″N 14°27′29″E	00288	Statue of St Theresa of Avila	Upload Photo
Niche of the Madonna of Lourdes	Triq il-Wied / Triq tal-Karmnu	35°53′49″N 14°27′34″E	00289	Niche of the Madonna of Lourdes	Upload Photo
Niche of All Souls	Triq L-Imriehel / Triq Xorrox	35°53′41″N 14°27′36″E	00290	Niche of All Souls	Upload Photo
Niche of St Joseph	38 Triq L-Imriehel	35°53′44″N 14°27′37″E	00291	Niche of St Joseph	Upload Photo
Church of the Sacred Heart	Triq il-Ferrovija l-Qadima	35°53′47″N 14°27′36″E	00292	Church of the Sacred Heart	Upload Photo
St Mary's Parish Church	Triq Tumas Dingli	35°53′42″N 14°27′47″E	00293	St Mary's Parish Church	Upload Photo
Niche of St Mary	Triq il-Kulleggjata / Triq Fleur-de-Lys	35°53′45″N 14°27′52″E	00294	Niche of St Mary	Upload Photo
Niche of St Joseph	28-29 Triq Fleur-de-Lys	35°53′45″N 14°27′54″E	00295	Niche of St Joseph	Upload Photo
Niche of the Madonna of Mount Carmel	5 Triq Mannarinu	35°53′46″N 14°27′53″E	00296	Niche of the Madonna of Mount Carmel	Upload Photo
Niche of St John the Baptist	Triq Fleur-de-Lys / Triq Salvu Psaila	35°53′43″N 14°27′57″E	00297	Niche of St John the Baptist	Upload Photo
Church of St Paul	Triq il-Wied / Triq il-Kbira	35°53′48″N 14°27′45″E	00298	Church of St Paul	Upload Photo
Niche of the Pieta	40/41 Triq il-Wied	35°53′49″N 14°27′42″E	00299	Niche of the Pieta	Upload Photo
Niche of St Joseph	195 Triq il-Wied	35°53′49″N 14°27′43″E	00300	Niche of St Joseph	Upload Photo
Niche of the Madonna of Mount Carmel	45 Triq l-Imriehel	35°53′46″N 14°27′39″E	00301	Niche of the Madonna of Mount Carmel	Upload Photo
Niche of St Helen	379A Triq Fleur-de-Lys	35°53′41″N 14°28′01″E	00302	Niche of St Helen	Upload Photo
Niche of the Madonna of the Rosary	79 Triq Fleur-de-Lys	35°53′41″N 14°28′03″E	00303	Niche of the Madonna of the Rosary	Upload Photo
Niche of St Anthony	111 Triq Fleur-de-Lys / Triq Sant'Antnin	35°53′40″N 14°28′08″E	00304	Niche of St Anthony	Upload Photo
Niche of the Immaculate Conception	123 Triq Fleur-de-Lys	35°53′39″N 14°28′10″E	00305	Niche of the Immaculate Conception	Upload Photo
Niche of the Madonna of Mount Carmel	Triq Fleur-de-Lys / Triq Brighella	35°53′38″N 14°28′10″E	00306	Niche of the Madonna of Mount Carmel	Upload Photo
Relief of Madonna and Child	Sqaq Nru 1, Triq San Giljan	35°54′05″N 14°28′05″E	00307	Relief of Madonna and Child	Upload Photo
Empty Niche	249 Triq San Giljan	35°54′05″N 14°28′09″E	00308	Empty Niche	Upload Photo
Relief	205 Triq L-Imsida	35°53′51″N 14°27′56″E	00309	Relief	Upload Photo
Niche of the Immaculate Conception	8 Triq Tahhan	35°54′09″N 14°27′47″E	00310	Niche of the Immaculate Conception	Upload Photo
Niche of the Madonna of Lourdes	6 Triq Tahhan	35°54′09″N 14°27′47″E	00311	Niche of the Madonna of Lourdes	Upload Photo
Niche of the Madonna of Mount Carmel	2 Triq Tahhan	35°54′09″N 14°27′47″E	00312	Niche of the Madonna of Mount Carmel	Upload Photo
Empty Niche	7 Sqaq Nru 1, Triq Has-Sajjied	35°54′06″N 14°27′48″E	00313	Empty Niche	Upload Photo
Niche of St Mary	2 Sqaq Nru 1, Triq Has-Sajjied	35°54′06″N 14°27′48″E	00314	Niche of St Mary	Upload Photo
Empty Niche	14 Sqaq Nru 1, Triq Has-Sajjied	35°54′06″N 14°27′47″E	00315	Empty Niche	Upload Photo
Empty Niche	27 Sqaq Nru 1, Triq Has-Sajjied	35°54′05″N 14°27′45″E	00316	Empty Niche	Upload Photo
Niche of St Helen	30 Triq il-Laqxija / Triq il-Kbira	35°54′05″N 14°27′50″E	00317	Niche of St Helen	Upload Photo
Empty Niche	1 Triq il-Laqxija	35°54′06″N 14°27′51″E	00318	Empty Niche	Upload Photo
Niche of St Helen	Triq il-Qasab / Triq Santa Marija	35°53′51″N 14°28′00″E	00319	Niche of St Helen	Upload Photo
Relief of a Madonna	14 Triq il-Herba	35°54′03″N 14°27′54″E	00320	Relief of a Madonna	Upload Photo
Relief of St Joseph	14 Triq il-Herba	35°54′03″N 14°27′53″E	00321	Relief of St Joseph	Upload Photo
Niche of St Michael	Triq il-Qasab	35°53′48″N 14°27′55″E	00322	Niche of St Michael	Upload Photo
Wignacourt Aqueduct	Triq L-Imdina	35°53′36″N 14°27′34″E	01165	Wignacourt Aqueduct	Upload Photo
Birkirkara Tower	Triq Għar il-Ġobon	35°54′04″N 14°28′02″E	01433	Birkirkara Tower	Upload Photo
In-Niċċa ta' l-Infetti	Triq l-Imriehel		MSPR0001		Upload Photo
Medieval Tower	Triq Għar il-Ġobon		MSPR0002		Upload Photo
Collegiate Parish Church of St Helen	Pjazza Santa Liena		MSPR0003		Upload Photo
Parish Church of the Assumption of Our Lady	Triq Tommaso Dingli		MSPR0004		Upload Photo
Ta' Għar il-Ġobon Windmill	Triq Dun Karm Psaila		MSPR0005		Upload Photo
Ta' Ganu Windmill	Triq il-Mithna		MSPR0006		Upload Photo
Imriehel Windmill	Triq il-Knisja l-Qadima		MSPR0007		Upload Photo
