= Villa Lauri =

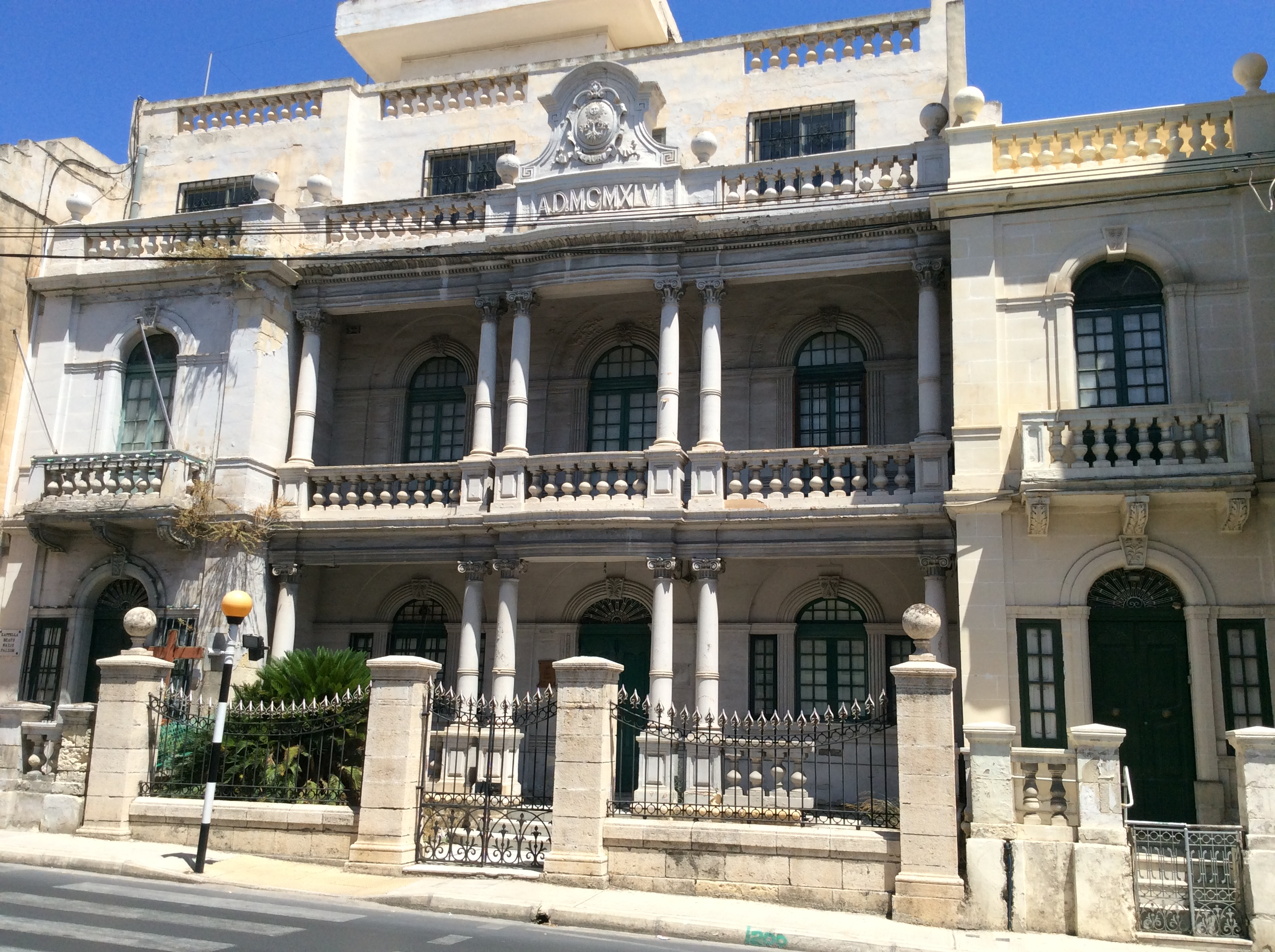
- View of Villa Lauri
- Interactive map of the Villa Lauri area

General information
- Status: Intact (under renovation)
- Type: Townhouse
- Architectural style: Neoclassical
- Location: Birkirkara, Malta
- Coordinates: 35°53′47.3″N 14°27′59.7″E
- Named for: Lauri family
- Completed: 1945
- Renovated: 1981; 2001; 2006; 2017
- Owner: Order of Friars Minor

Technical details
- Material: Limestone
- Floor count: 4

Villa Lauri is an early 20th-century Neoclassical townhouse in Birkirkara, Malta. The villa was built as a private family residence. Part of the property is privately owned, while most of it belongs to the Roman Catholic Church. At one point the Franciscan friars named their part of the property as Dar Frate Francesco and it was later renamed a number of times. The building has primarily served as a shelter for the homeless.

Since the early 1980s the friars converted their residence into a home for local minors with social difficulties. From 2001 till 2006, it served as a residence for unaccompanied child refugees. A chapel known as Blessed Nazju Falzon Chapel was inaugurated in early 2001, within the building.

The home was then re-inaugurated by Lawrence Gonzi after extensive structural work. The interior of the building was modified, however keeping the original façade. It was renovated again in 2006 to host migrant families, but the home has been shut down since 2010. The chapel closed in early 2017. It is currently undergoing renovation.

== History ==
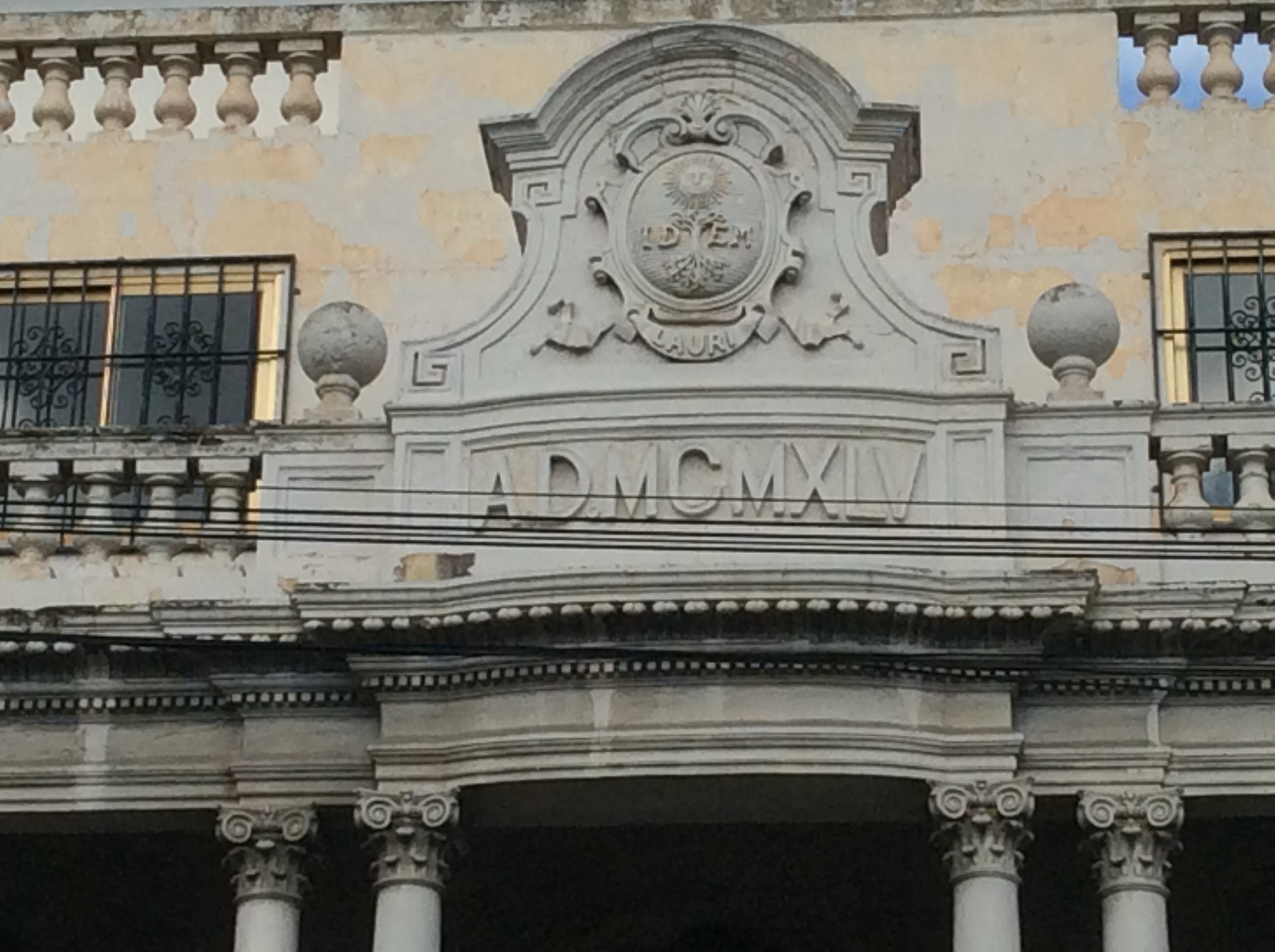
Origin of name and construction date are visible on the façade

Villa Lauri was completed in 1945 (A.D. MCMXLV) as a residential building, at 55 [Don Gaetano] Mannarino Road in Birkirkara, BKR 08. Part of the property became in possession of the Roman Catholic Church and has since then been administered by the Order of Friars Minor (OFM).

The villa has an imposing façade and was one of the first structures to be built on the present road. Other buildings were constructed in the period when the area saw a community growth, as Malta was a British colony.

The oldest still standing building in the area is found round the corner of the villa in Filippo Borgia Street, that is the Tal-Wejter Tower, which was built during the Order of St. John. Evidence of the early growing population in the areas during the British period is some of the surrounding buildings and structures such as the Birkirkara Station, the now Birkirkara Station Garden, and a number of cinemas, including the close by Roxy Cinema.

=== Home ===
After the villa was sold from the original owners and large part of the property came into possession of the church, the property of the church was named Dar Frate Francesco by the Franciscan Friars.

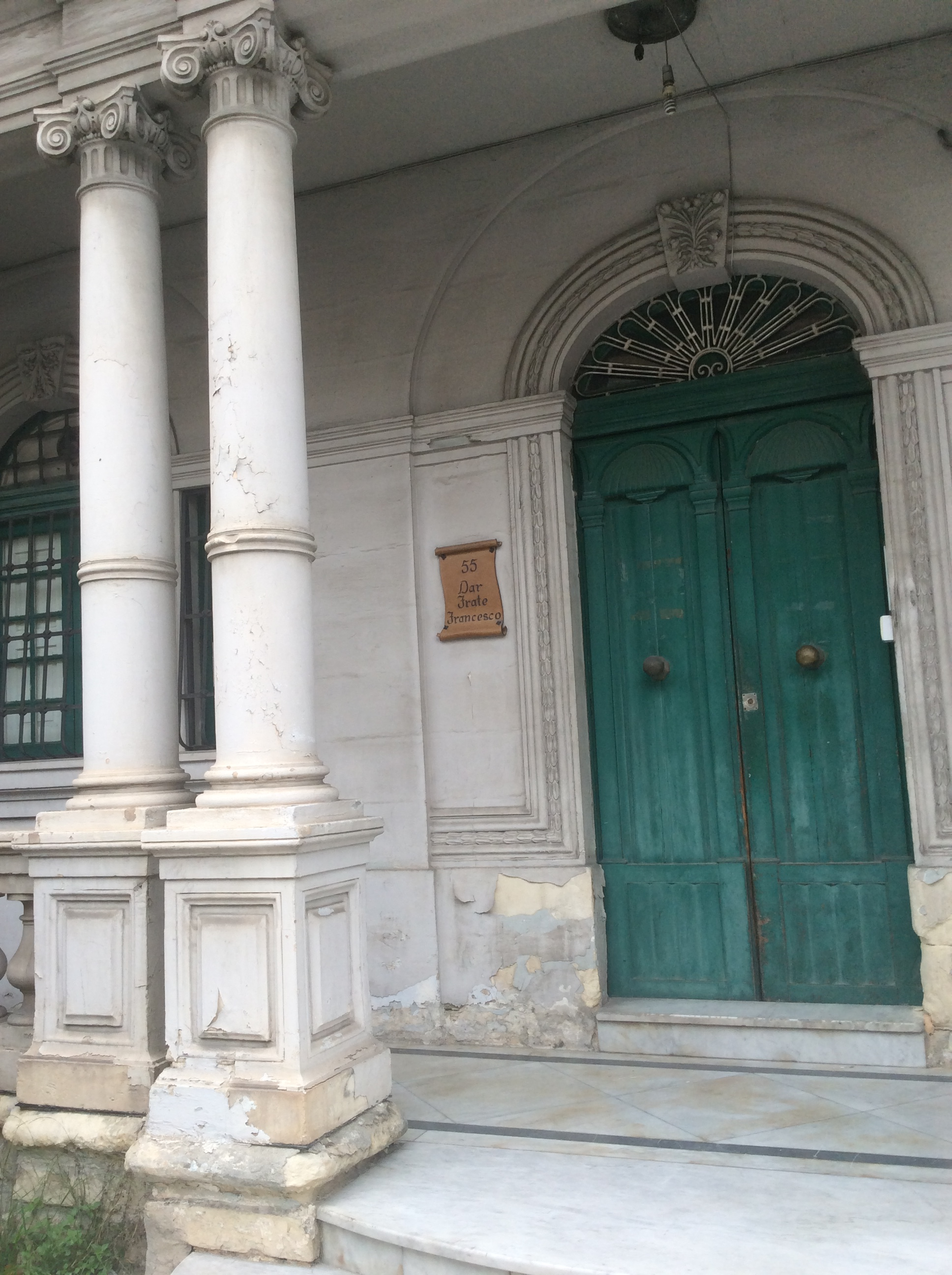
Dar Frate Francesco entrance in 2016

In 1981 the residential part of the house was modified to accommodate youth with social difficulties that may face social problems for multiple reasons. Since then the main part of the building has served as a home generally for youth, with the exception for a short lived home for African migrant families. The home opened its doors for the youth in 1981, on the initiative of the founder Adrijan Cachia (OFM). During its mission as a home over 600 youth (between 10 and 13 years) residents have received temporal stay at the villa and admittance was irrelevant to religious belief of the clients. It was administered by two Roman Catholic priests and a number of secular workers. Cachia was the first director of the home and was later succeeded by Father P. Eddie Pace (OFM), and last was Father John Abela. The youth were provided with a bedroom (alone or shared) and access to most of the house as common space. The house provided for the needs of the residents, such as a better alternative in the lack of family environment and a social worker as a social reference support. This aimed to prepare the youth for independent living. More government funds, for works and service, were given in 1994. On 9 January (1998) Giacomo Bini, the Minister General of the OFM, was received by Pace at the building for breakfast.

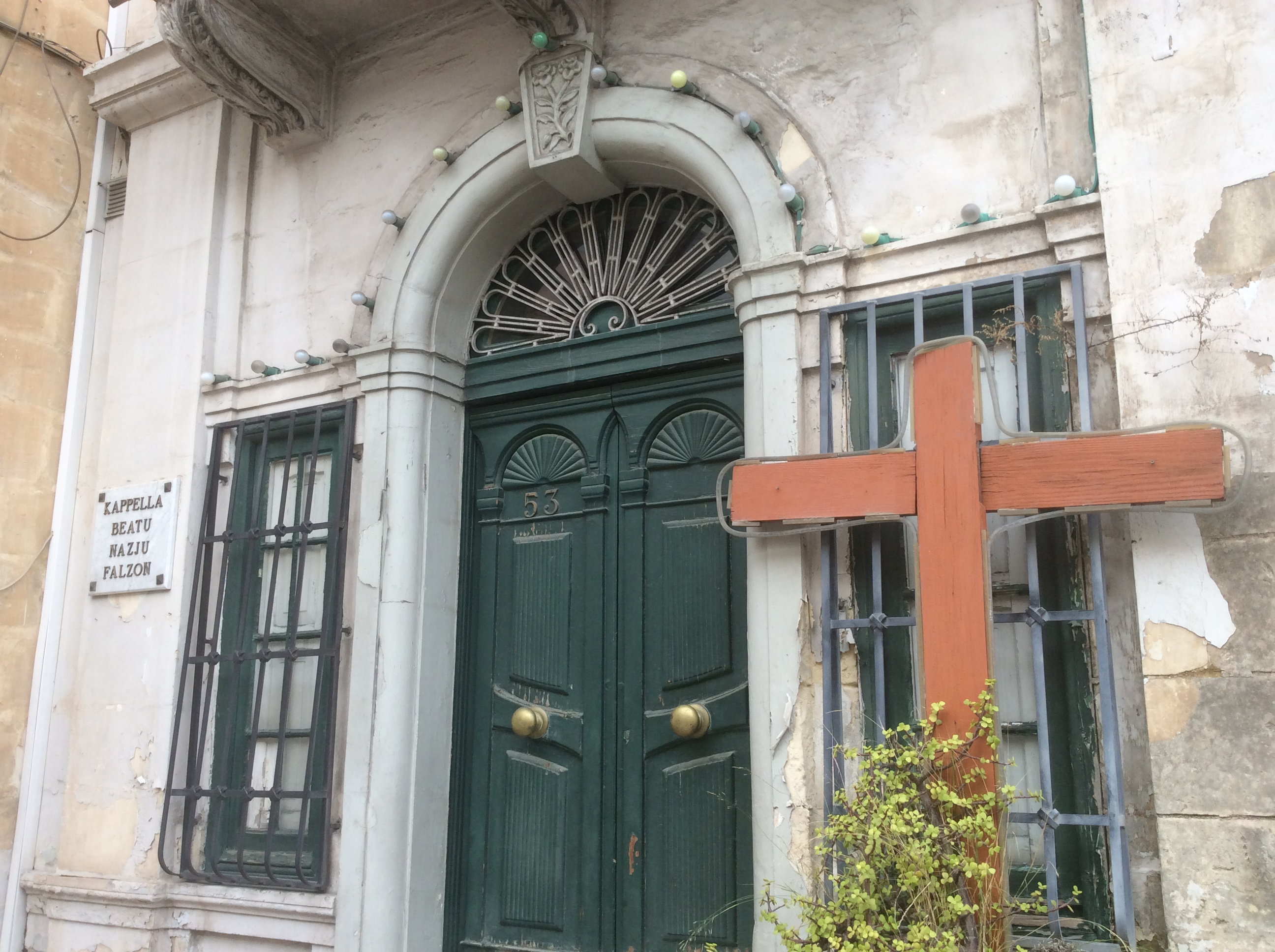
Beatu Nazju Falzon Chapel, on the left-side

The villa received prominence at national level since the 1980s and more recently in 2001, when the lack of finance put at risk for the closure of the home. On 14 March of that year the Friars reached an agreement with the Ministry of Social Services, housed at Palazzo Ferreria, to receive financial social services from the Government of Malta and other sources. An agreement was reached under notary Eugene Montanaro with the condition that the home works hand in hand with Aġenzija Appoġġ. Soon after the agreement, the house was restructured and upgraded with modern facilities at a financial cost of Lm 50,000, of which Lm 31,148 were allocated from Appoġġ with finance paid by the government of Malta. The home was then still run by the Friars, but also assisted by Programme Manager Anna Maria Laurenti, who received her studies in London. The part of the property used for religious services was kept and restructured, and was this time open as Blessed Nazju Falzon Chapel. Falzon is a beatified Maltese and this house-church is the first and only place of worship dedicated to him. The chapel within the property has its own entrance and was inaugurated to the public on 30 May 2001 by provincial Bernard Bartolo.

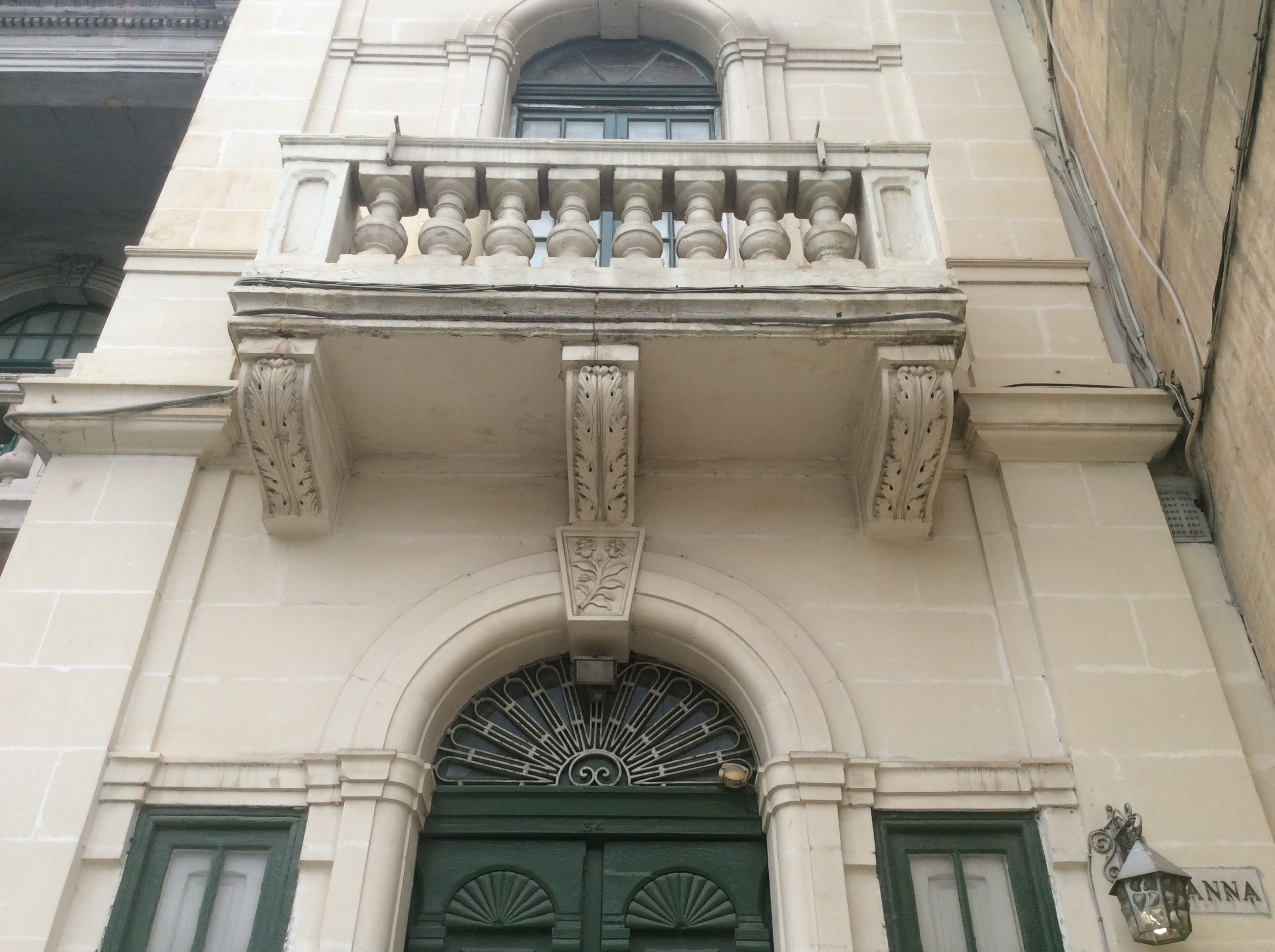
St Anne house is a private family residence, the right-side of the villa

Lawrence Gonzi has given his political support for the maintenance of the home in order to remain functional and keep aiding people in need. After several projects at the house, Gonzi has re-inaugurated the home on 22 November 2001 in a public ceremony. Among those present was Joseph "Joe" Gerada, the Executive Head of Agenzija Appogg at the time. Along the years, even if the name of the home remained to be known as Dar Frate Francesco, the home has changed name a number of times such as Formula One and Dar il-Qawsalla (meaning Rainbow House). Refugees were given opportunities to receive free basic education at the building, provided by the Education Ministry, with an emphasis to learn the English language. As the number of parentless youth refugees requesting shelter dropped drastically, from January 2006 the home started receiving adult refugees consisting of families and lonely mothers with children. In 2009 the home saw some moderate renovation, with the voluntarily work of sailors from the USS Barry (DDG-52).

The home was a registered NGO and was occasionally open to the public. Villa Lauri includes the home (Dar Frate Francesco), the prayer house (Beatu Falzon Chapel) and a private residence (St Anne house). Since the building of the villa, the three parts together have always been known as simply the villa and known to the locals as Villa Lauri. The home was shut down on 19 December 2010 soon after the loss of Fr Abela. At some point it served as a temporary shelter for former prisoners and drug abusers. It was occasionally used for meetings by people with blindness disability. The house-church was open to the public. There were daily masses at 17:30 and till it closed in 2017 the chaplain was John Azzopardi (OFM).

=== Other ===
In the early morning of 4 February 2016, an unknown driver hit a van on the move in Mannarino Road, when driving his Volkswagen vehicle. As a consequence of the collision, the van then crashed into a showroom, forming part of a block of apartments next to Villa Lauri, which missed from damaging the front of the villa by a close proximity.

== Architecture ==
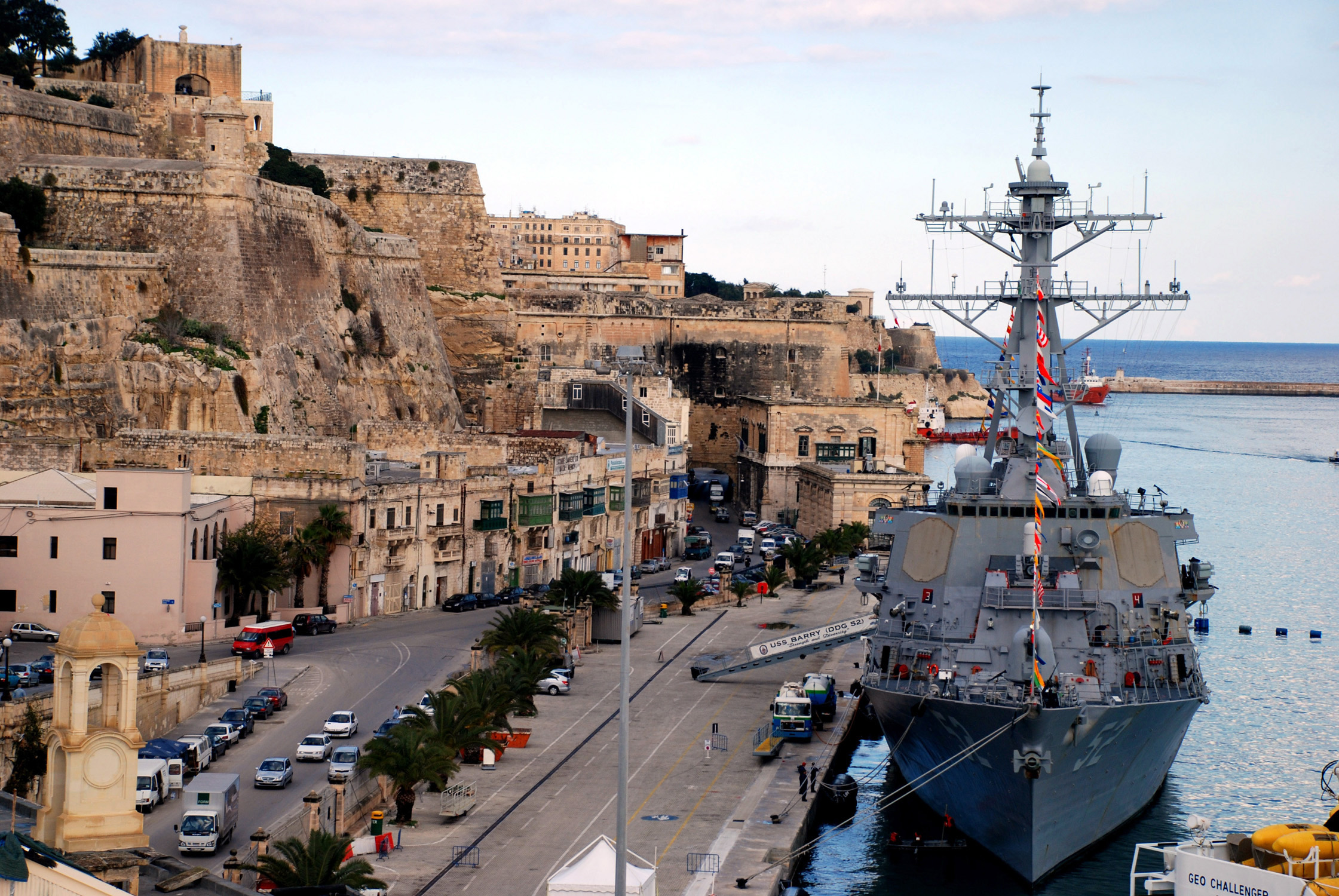
USS Barry (DDG 52) stationed in Malta, in 2009. The sailors made some voluntarily work at the villa.

The building has a Neoclassic façade, with some Art Nouveau features. The building's main features are the neoclassic columns and its spacious front terraces. It is presently divided into 2/3 parts: the chapel and Dar Frate Francesco that is the main residence which together are simply called Frate Franceso and belong to the Roman Catholic Church, and a privately owned residence. The interior of the building was extensively modified, when the refurbishment of the chapel and the home took place, and the exterior remains unaltered.
