= Concetta Brincat =

First known female Maltese-language novelist

- Brincat in 1920
- Born: Concetta Sciberras; 1870; Birkirkara, Malta
- Died: 1940 (aged 69–70)
- Other name: Cornelia Melitesi
- Known for: First known female Maltese language novelist
- Notable work: Il-Familja de Valereux jew Louis Mitluf Ġewwa l-Bosk (1919)

Concetta Brincat (born Concetta Sciberras; 1870 – 1940) was a Maltese author who is the first known female novelist to write in the Maltese language. Her first novel, Il-Familja de Valereux jew Louis Mitluf Ġewwa l-Bosk (transl. The de Valereux Family, or, Louis Lost in the Woods), was published in 2025 despite being written in 1919.

== Early life and education ==
Brincat was born Concetta Sciberras in Laqxija, Birkirkara, Malta, in 1870. Neither of her parents could read nor write. At the age of 4, Brincat traveled on the Lancefield to French colonial Algeria with her mother Ġuża, her brothers Spiridione and Salvatore, and her sister Karmena for their education.

The family lived in the Arab quarter of the city of Constantine, French Algeria. At the age of 13, Brincat earned her Certificat d’études primaires and she returned to Malta in 1885.

In 1890, she married Vincenzo Brincat and together they had 10 children. Her seventh child, Emmanuela (nicknamed Emma), would be the one to pass on her unpublished works to Brincat's descendants, allowing them to be rediscovered a century later.

== Writing ==
Research in the 2020s by literary scholar Adrian Grima has identified two novels written by Brincat: Il-Familja de Valereux jew Louis Mitluf Ġewwa l-Bosk (1919) and Is-Saħħara Nerelis (1922), neither of which were published while she was alive. Brincat is the first known female Maltese language novelist, her books predating Mary Meilak's Nokkla Sewda by almost 40 years.

While writing her novels, Brincat used a pen name, Cornelia Melitesi. The surname, Melitesi, is likely an attempt to write "Maltese" in Latin orthography. The first name, Cornelia, is likely a reference to the Mother of the Gracchi, also named Cornelia. The use of a pen name implied Brincat's intention for the works to be published eventually.

Her first novel, Il-Familja de Valereux jew Louis Mitluf Ġewwa l-Bosk, was written in 1919 and centered on a Gothic retelling of the French Revolution. It was published in 2025 by Klabb Kotba Maltin, an imprint of Midsea Books. According to Adrian Grima of the University of Malta, Brincat's first novel appears to be entirely original, something unique among contemporary Maltese-language novels, which tended to be translations of other works. Maltese historian Simone Azzopardi said that the book's setting during the French Revolution "vividly mirrors Maltese life at the turn of the twentieth century."

The manuscript for Il-Familja de Valereux jew Louis Mitluf Ġewwa l-Bosk was passed down through Brincat's family: from her daughter Emma, to her granddaughter Desdemona, and finally to Nicholas Bonello, Desdemona's husband, before it would be published nearly a century later. Her descendants advocated for the book to be published. The handwritten manuscript was transcribed by Maria Simiana. Adrian Grima edited it, taking into account semantic shifts and inconsistent orthographic choices, and Reno Fenech proofread.

Brincat's second novel was written in 1922. Called Is-Saħħara Nerelis, it is set in the time of Emperor Nero.

== Novels ==
- Il-Familja de Valereux jew Louis Mitluf Ġewwa l-Bosk (transl. The de Valereux Family, or Louis Lost in the Woods) (1919)
- Is-Saħħara Nerelis (transl. The Sorceress Nerelis) (1922)
