= Birkirkara =

Birkirkara Birkirkara
- Local council
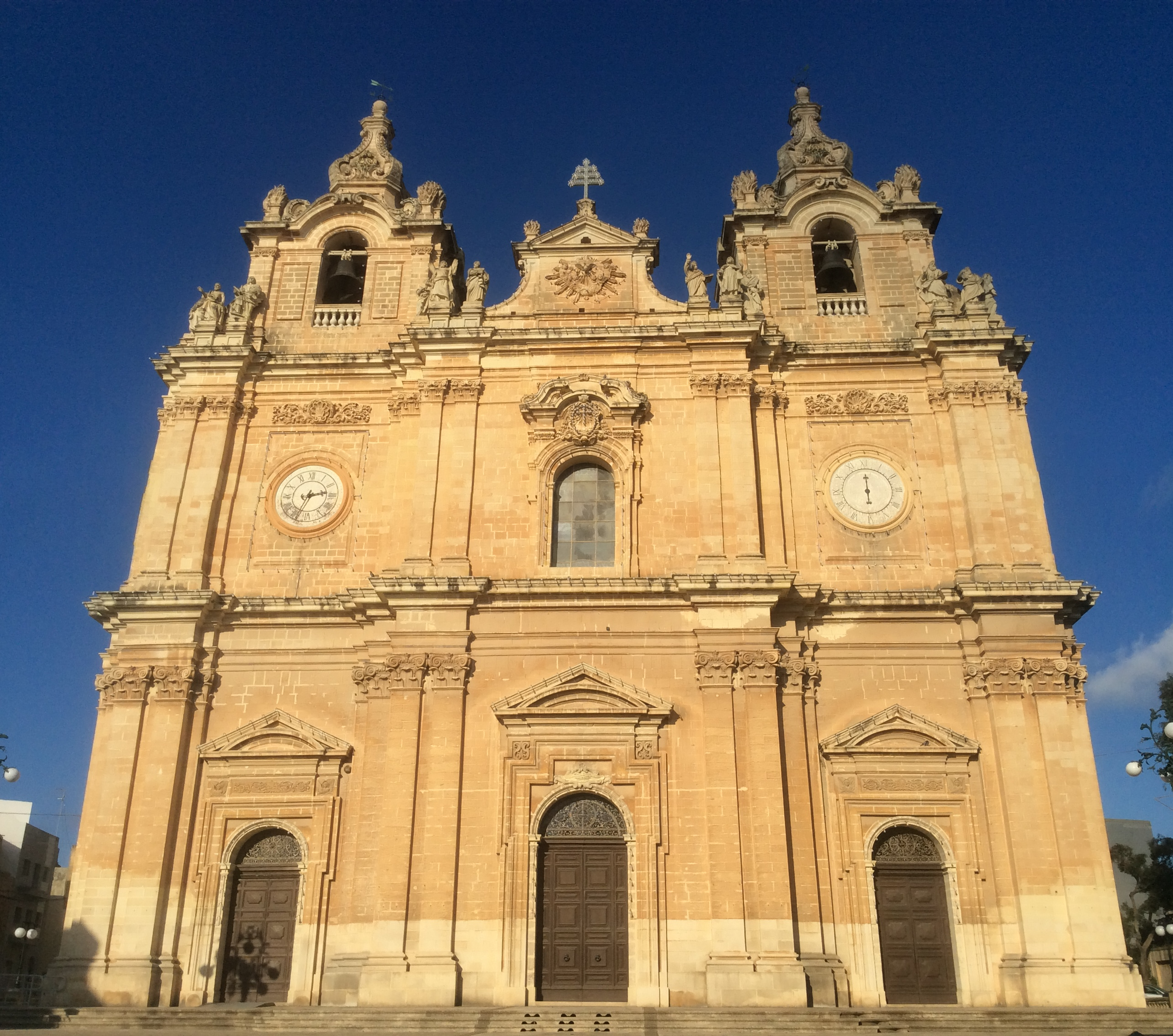
- St. Helen's Basilica – Parish Church

- Flag Coat of arms
- Motto: In hoc signo vinces
- Coordinates: 35°53′48″N 14°27′45″E
- Country: Malta
- Region: Eastern Region
- District: Northern Harbour District
- Borders: Attard, Balzan, Iklin, Msida, Qormi, San Ġwann, Santa Venera

Government
  - Mayor: Desirei Grech (PN)

Area
  - Total: 2.7 km^{2} (1.0 sq mi)
- Elevation: 40 m (130 ft)

Population (July 2026)
  - Total: 30 166
  - Density: 11,000.3/km^{2} (28,491/sq mi)
- Demonym(s): Karkariż (m), Karkariża (f), Karkariżi (pl)
- Time zone: UTC+1 (CET)
  - Summer (DST): UTC+2 (CEST)
- Postal code: BKR
- Dialing code: 356
- ISO 3166 code: MT-04
- Patron saints: Helena Empress; Saint Joseph; Our Lady of Mount Carmel; Anthony of Padua
- Day of festa: Saint Helen: 18 August (or first Sunday after date); Sunday after 15 August; 1 May; First Sunday of July; First Sunday of June
- Website: Official website

Birkirkara (abbreviated as B'Kara or BKR) is a city in the Eastern Region of Malta. It is the second most populous on the island, with 30,166 inhabitants as of July 2026. The town consists of five autonomous parishes: Saint Helen, Saint Joseph the Worker, Our Lady of Mount Carmel, Saint Mary and San Gorg Preca. The city's motto is In hoc signo vinces, and its coat of arms is a plain red cross, surmounted by a crown.

The population of Birkirkara was 30,166 in july 2026. 20,095 Maltese nationals and 10,071 foreign nationals.

== Etymology ==
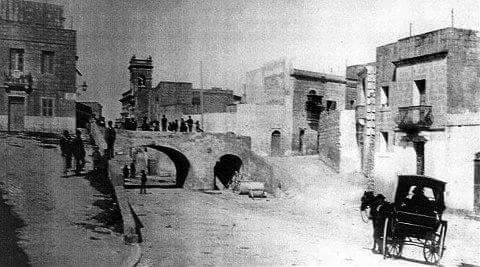
Valley road, c. 1900

Birkirkara means "cold well" or "running water" in Maltese. This is attributed to the valley in the town.

Originally, the name was written as Birchircara, as influenced by Italian spelling which traditionally does not use the letter 'K'. It is often abbreviated as B'kara/Kara.

== Geography ==
Birkirkara is situated in a valley, which is most likely where it gets its name from. It is known for flooding on heavy stormy days. Several projects have been proposed. The area has also received embellishment works from time to time.

== Climate ==
Birkirkara features a Csa Mediterranean climate under the Köppen climate classification. Birkirkara features mild, wet winters and dry hot summers. The city's temperature varies from 10.3 to 30.7 °C (50.5 to 87.3 °F) during the course of a year.

Birkirkara

Climate chart (precipitation, max. and min. temperature)
J	F	M	A	M	J	J	A	S	O	N	D
225 15 10	150 15 10	100 17 12	80 19 13	50 23 16	0 27 20	0 29 22	15 31 24	80 28 22	200 25 19	170 20 15	200 17 12
- █ Average max. and min. temperatures in °C
- █ Precipitation totals in mm
Imperial conversion
J	F	M	A	M	J	J	A	S	O	N	D
8.9 59 50	5.9 59 50	3.9 63 54	3.1 66 55	2 73 61	0 81 68	0 84 72	0.6 88 75	3.1 82 72	7.9 77 66	6.7 68 59	7.9 63 54
- █ Average max. and min. temperatures in °F
- █ Precipitation totals in inches

== Description ==
Birkirkara is one of Malta's oldest towns with a recorded mention in 1402 with The Cappella of Birkarkam which is understood to be an error for Birkirkara. It received mention in the 1436 Ecclesiastical Report mentioning the then existing parishes in Malta and Gozo, from which Birkirkara emerged as the largest parish. Various parishes and suburbs developed out of Birkirkara over the years, including Sliema, St. Julian's, Msida, Ħamrun in the 19th century and Santa Venera in the early 20th century. In more recent years, San Ġwann (1965) and Ta' l-Ibraġ hived off Birkirkara to form part of the new parish and locality of Swieqi in 1993.

Birkirkara has grown into an important commercial centre as well as a densely populated residential area.

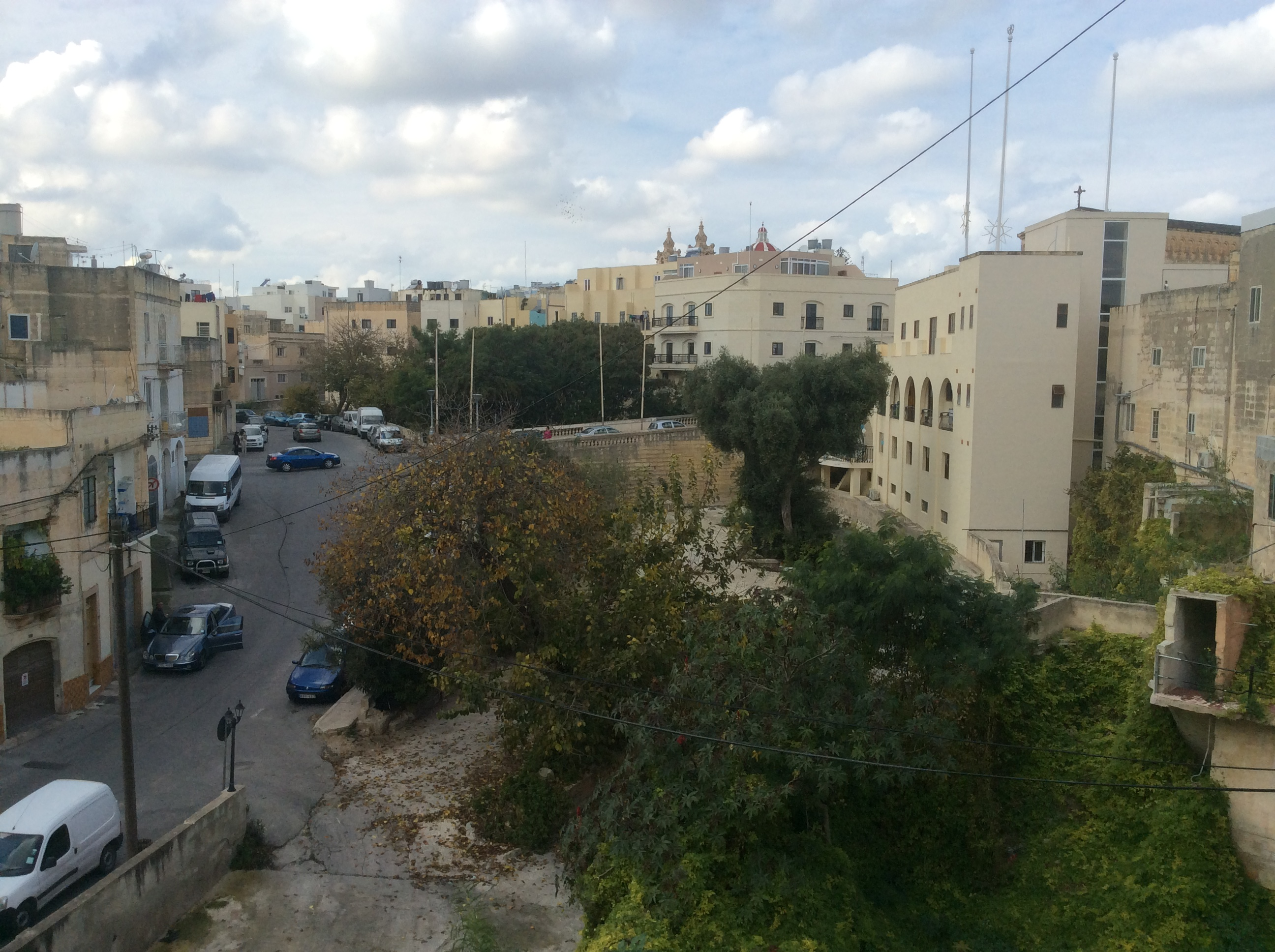
Wejter Valley in Birkirkara

== Churches, architecture and notable places ==
=== Notable places ===
Birkirkara is home to many locations of importance.

- Malta Financial Services Authority the financial regulator of Malta has its headquarters in Birkirkara.
- St Aloysius College
- The Wignacourt Aqueduct built in the 17th century.
- St Helen's Basilica, housing Malta's largest church bell.
- Simonds Farsons Cisk - the first brewery on the Island.
- Dar Pirotta
- Dar Papa Frangisku - A homeless shelter run by Caritas Malta
- Villa Chelsea now home to The Richmond Foundation - A Charity offering Rehabilitation Programmes.
- The Old Birkirkara Railway Station which is today located within a public garden is one such place. Malta Railway trains used as means of transportation across the island stopped at this Station. The Railway was closed in 1931.
- Roxy Cinema
- Birkirkara Tower (Ghar il-Gobon)
- Tal-Wejter Tower
- Villa Lauri
- Ta' Ganu Windmill

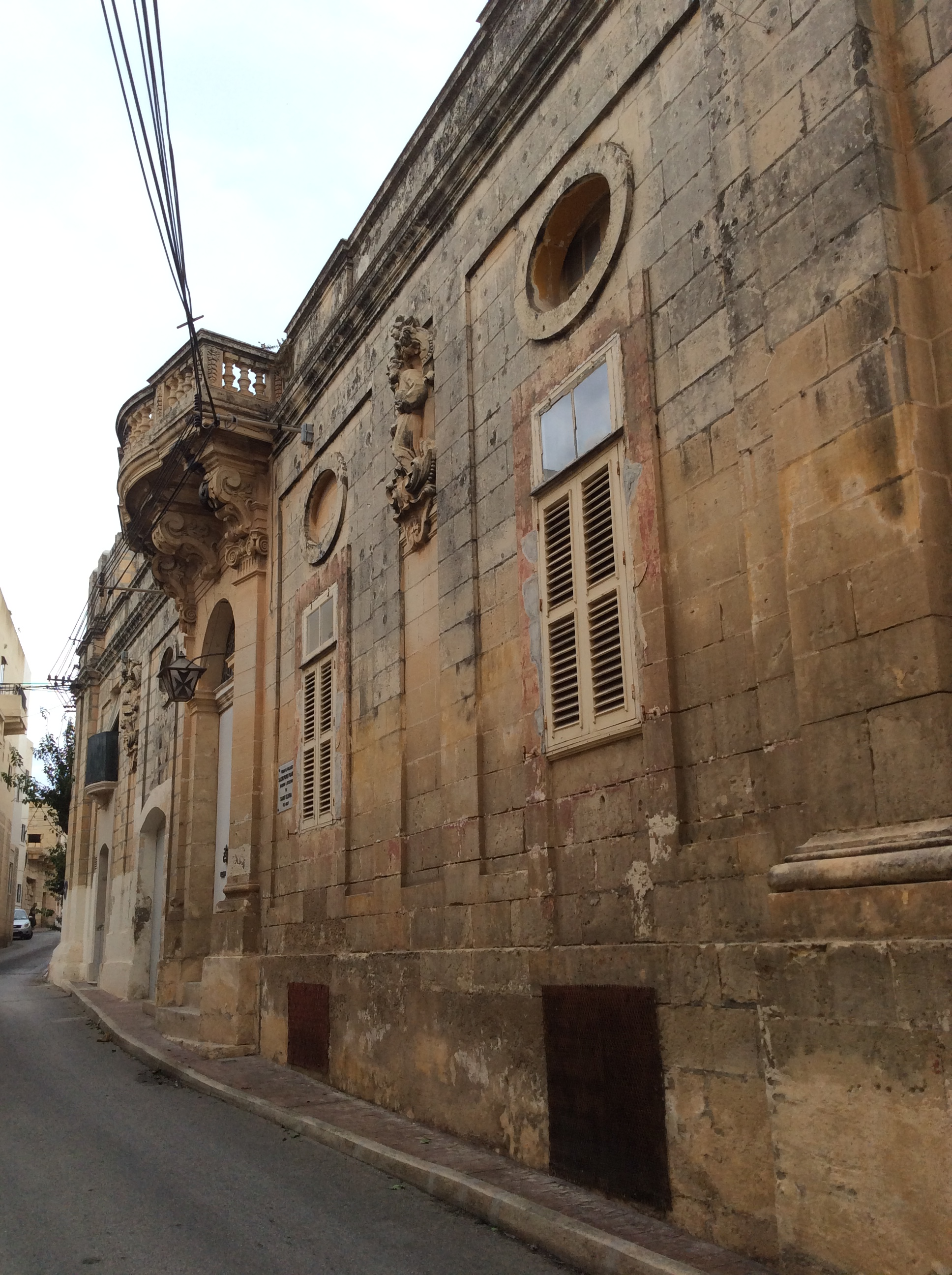
St Helen Palace, Birkirkara

=== Churches ===
Birkirkara's main religious feast is that of St Helen at St. Helen's Basilica, which is celebrated on 18 August or on the first Sunday after that date. The main event of the celebration is a procession with a wooden statue carved by the Maltese master-sculptor Salvu Psaila. Notably, this is the only procession on the island carried out in the morning. The procession leaves the basilica at exactly 8:00 am and returns to it at 10:45 am. The statue is lifted to shoulder-height by a group of townsmen through the main streets of the town.

- The Church of St. Joseph the Worker
- The Church of St. Mary
- The Church of San Gorg Preca
- The Church of Our Lady of Mount Carmel
- The Church of St Paul B'kara had a previous building on the same site likely to date back to around 1538. Its design was medieval with a slanting roof. The present building known as 'San Pawl tal-Wied' was built in 1852 to 1854 on plans drawn up by Giuseppe Bonavia who was an architect with the Royal Engineers. The clock of the church was made by Michelangelo Sapiano in 1891. The titular painting by Giuseppe Calleja is a reproduction of the original found in the Tre Fontane Church in Rome.

The Church of Our Lady of Victories is a small church found within the narrow streets in the area known as 'Has-Sajjied'. This church was known to have existed as far back as 1575. In the 17th century when the parish church was being built, this church was dismantled to allow easy access to the quarry that was supplying the stones needed. It was erected once again after the 1675–1676 Malta plague epidemic. The present church was built between 1728 and 1736 in the Baroque style. The internal pilasters follow the Tuscan style with the dome featuring floral motifs and emblems of the Litany of the Blessed Virgin Mary.

=== Monuments ===
- Monument of Sir Anthony Mamo
- Niche of All Souls

== Birkirkara Local Council ==
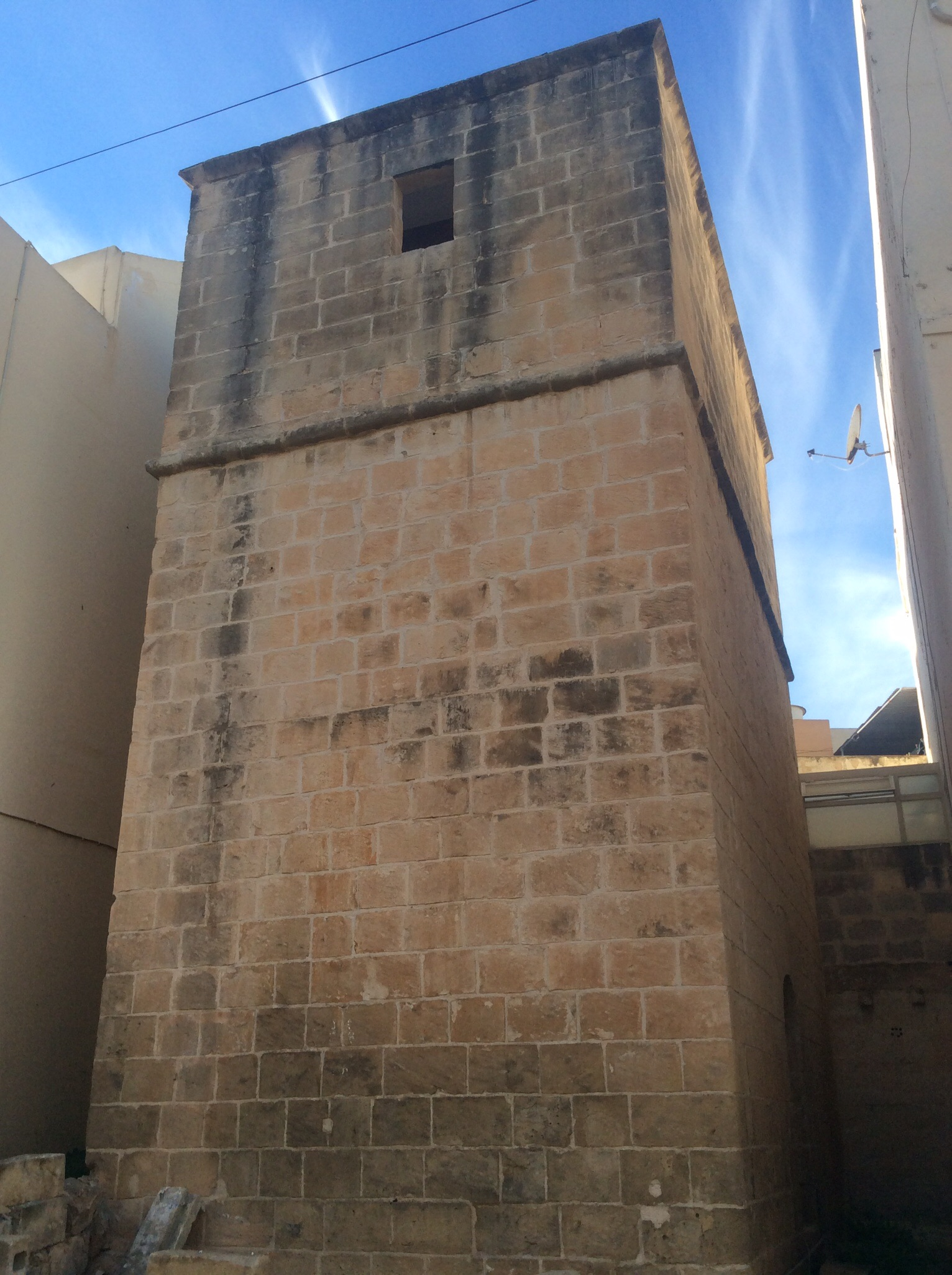
Tal-Wejter Tower, former defence on the valley

The Birkirkara Local Council forms part of the Birkirkara Civice Centre building. The current Birkirkara local council members are:

- Joanne Debono Grech (Mayor)
- Karl Cutajar (Deputy Mayor)
- Justin Schembri
- Nancy Aquilina
- Rita Borg
- Kaylocke Buhagiar
- Antoine Attard
- Owen Patrick Attard
- John Mary Calleja
- Deborah Mifsud
- John Mizzi
- Marie Claire Zammit Bonello
- Francis Pullicino
- Carmel Attard (Executive Secretary)

== Birkirkara community service ==
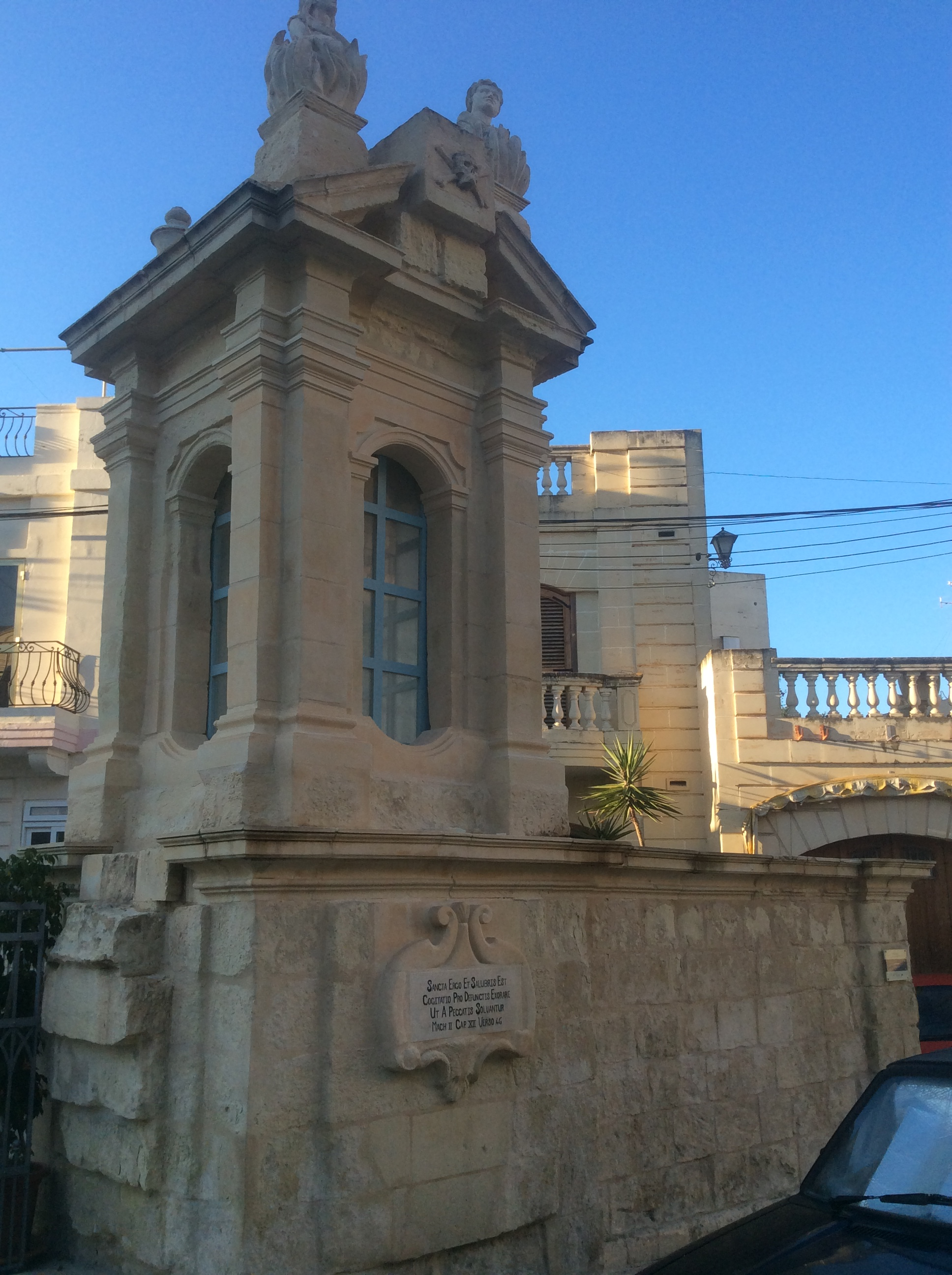
Niche of All Souls close to St. Mary Church (Old Church) is a Maltese cultural heritage niche

- Our Lady of Mount Carmel Parish Church, Triq Fleur-de-Lys (Fleur-de-Lys Road), Fleur-de-Lys
- Our Lady, Mother of the Church Parish Church, Triq il-Graffiti Navali, Swatar
- St. Joseph the Worker Parish Church, Triq il-Bwieraq (Bwieraq Street)
- St. Helen's Parish Church, Triq is-Santwarju (Sanctuary Street)
- St. Mary's Parish Church, Triq il-Knisja l-Qadima (Old Church Street)
- Our Lady of Victory Parish Church, Triq il-Vitorja (Victory Street)
- Birkirkara District Police Station, Triq il-Kbira (Main Street)
- Birkirkara Branch Post Office, Triq il-Wied (Valley Road
- Da Vinci Hospital, Triq Kan. K. Pirotta (Can. K. Pirotta Street)
- Birkirkara Health Centre, Triq Tumas Fenech
- Birkirkara Regional Library, Triq Tumas Fenech
- Birkirkara Police Station

== Zones in Birkirkara ==
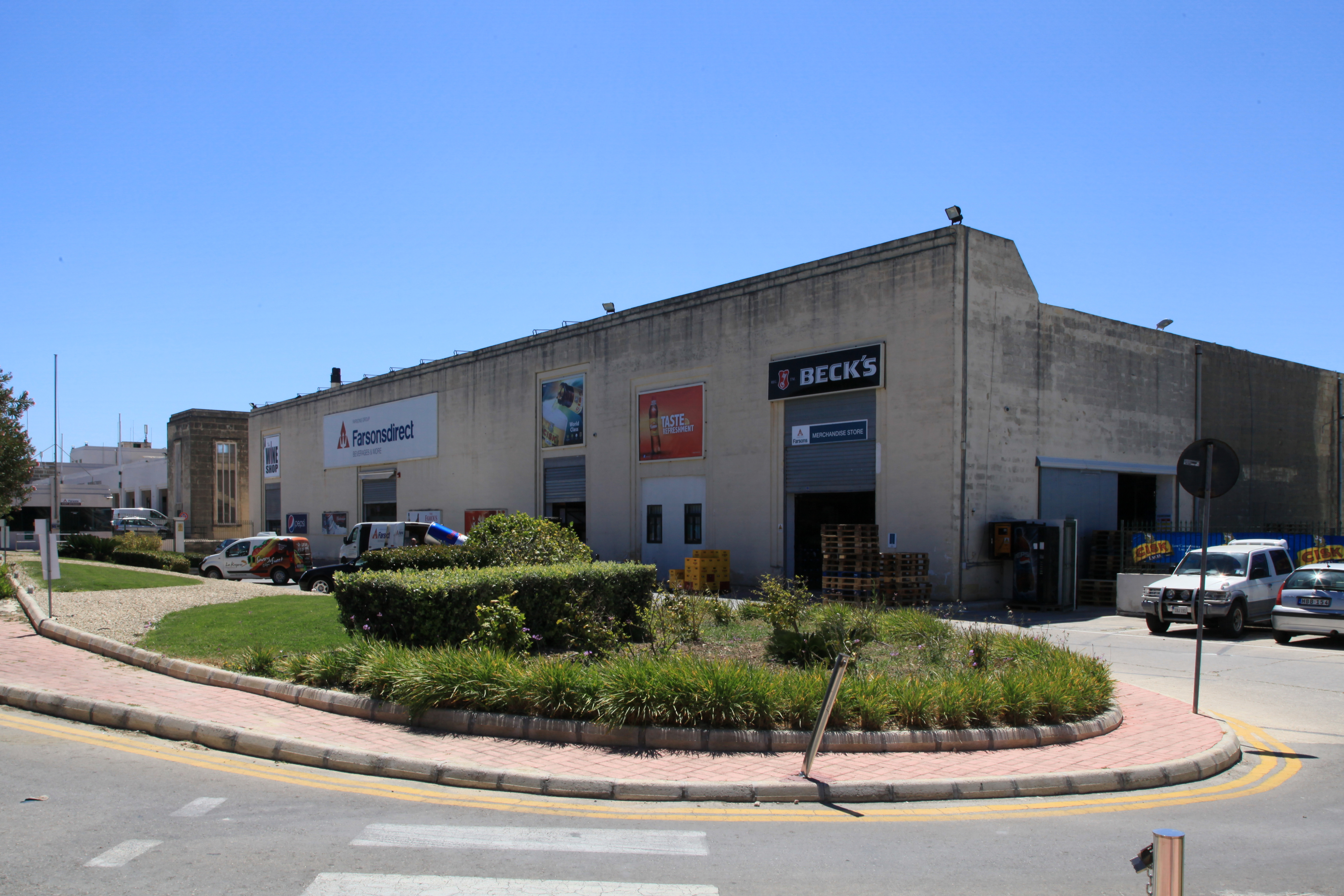
Mrieħel

- Bwieraq
- Fleur-de-Lys
- L-Imrieħel
- Ta' Ganu
- Ta' Paris
- Tal-Qattus
- Is-Swatar
- Ħas-Sajjied

== Sport ==
Birkirkara has a multi-sport club in Birkirkara Saint Joseph Sports Club, mostly known for its Athletics section. However, it also has active sections responsible for cycling, triathlon, swimming, and football, the last of which competes in the Maltese Inter-Amateur Soccer Competition.

Birkirkara F.C. has won the Maltese Premier League four times. Birkirkara F.C. participated in the 2015–16 UEFA Europa League beating West Ham United F.C., only to be eliminated via penalties. Birkirkara also eliminated Heart of Midlothian in the 2016–17 UEFA Europa League. Malta's leader of the opposition Adrian Delia served as Birkirkara F.C. president from 2015-2016 and 2017-2018.

== Notable people ==
- Iacob Heraclid, the Greco-Maltese adventurer who ruled over Moldavia in the 1560s, was born in the city.
- Eddie Fenech Adami, who served as Prime Minister and President of Malta, was born there.
- Anthony Mamo, the first President of Malta.
- Concetta Brincat, the first female Maltese-language novelist

== Twin towns – sister cities ==
Birkirkara is twinned with:

- Grosseto, Italy
- Sorrento, Italy
- Longobardi, Italy
- Carbonne, France
