= Tal-Wejter Tower =

- Torri tal-Wejter
- Birkirkara, Malta
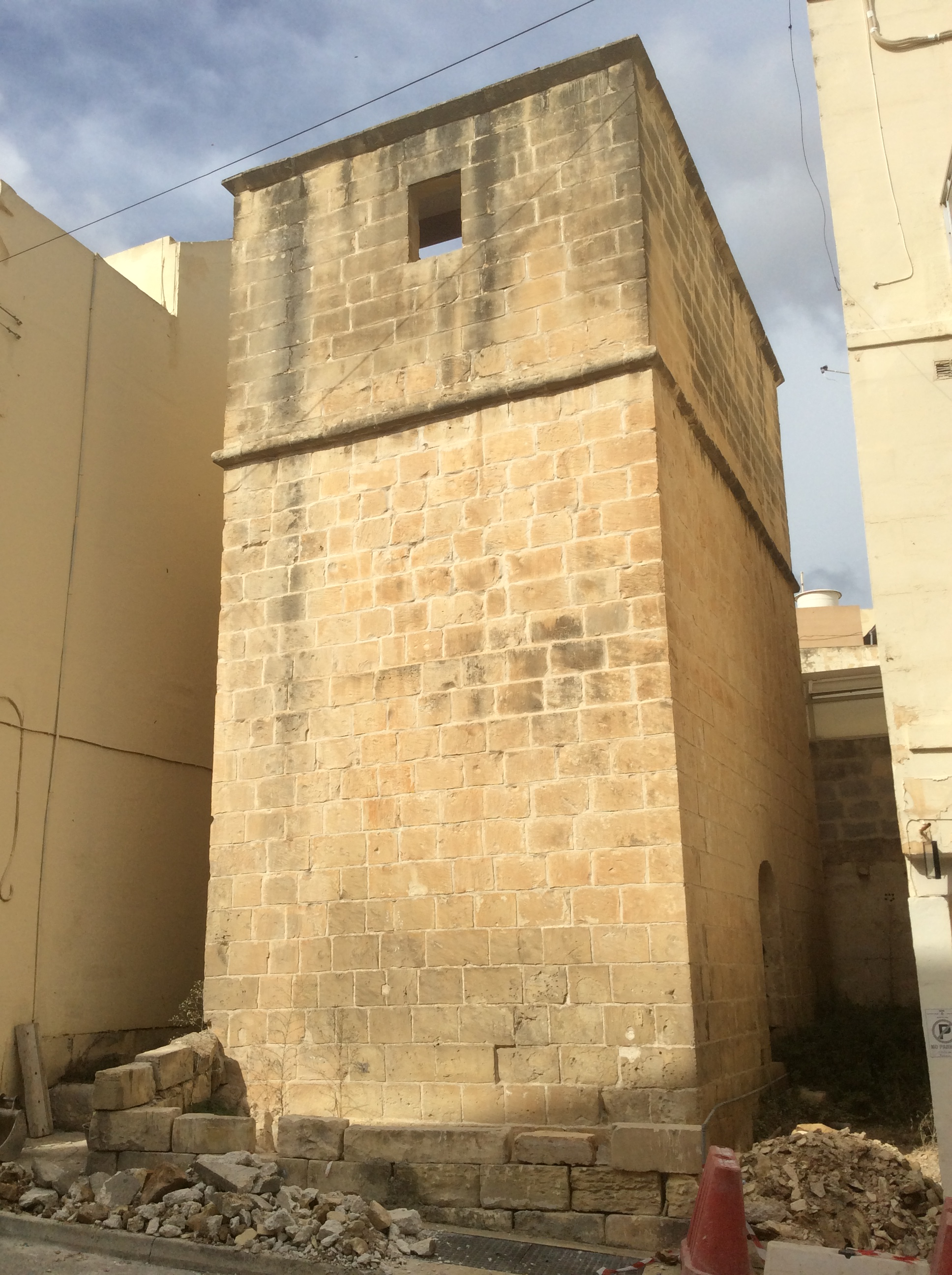
- View of Tal-Wejter Tower, with original dismantled stones at the bottom

Site information
- Type: Tower
- Owner: Private
- Open to the public: No
- Condition: Intact but dilapidated

Location
- Coordinates: 35°53′49.8″N 14°28′1.9″E

Site history
- Built: 1710
- Built by: Order of Saint John
- Materials: Limestone

Tal-Wejter Tower (Maltese: Torri tal-Wejter - It-Torri Wejter) is a tower in Birkirkara, Malta, which was built in the early 18th century by the Order of Saint John. It is also known locally as it-Torri tal-Misħun (English: Boiling Water Tower), a reference to its machicolations which are known as galleriji tal-misħun in Maltese. The tower was partially demolished in the 1960s, but it was later rebuilt. Today, it is in a rather dilapidated state.

== History ==
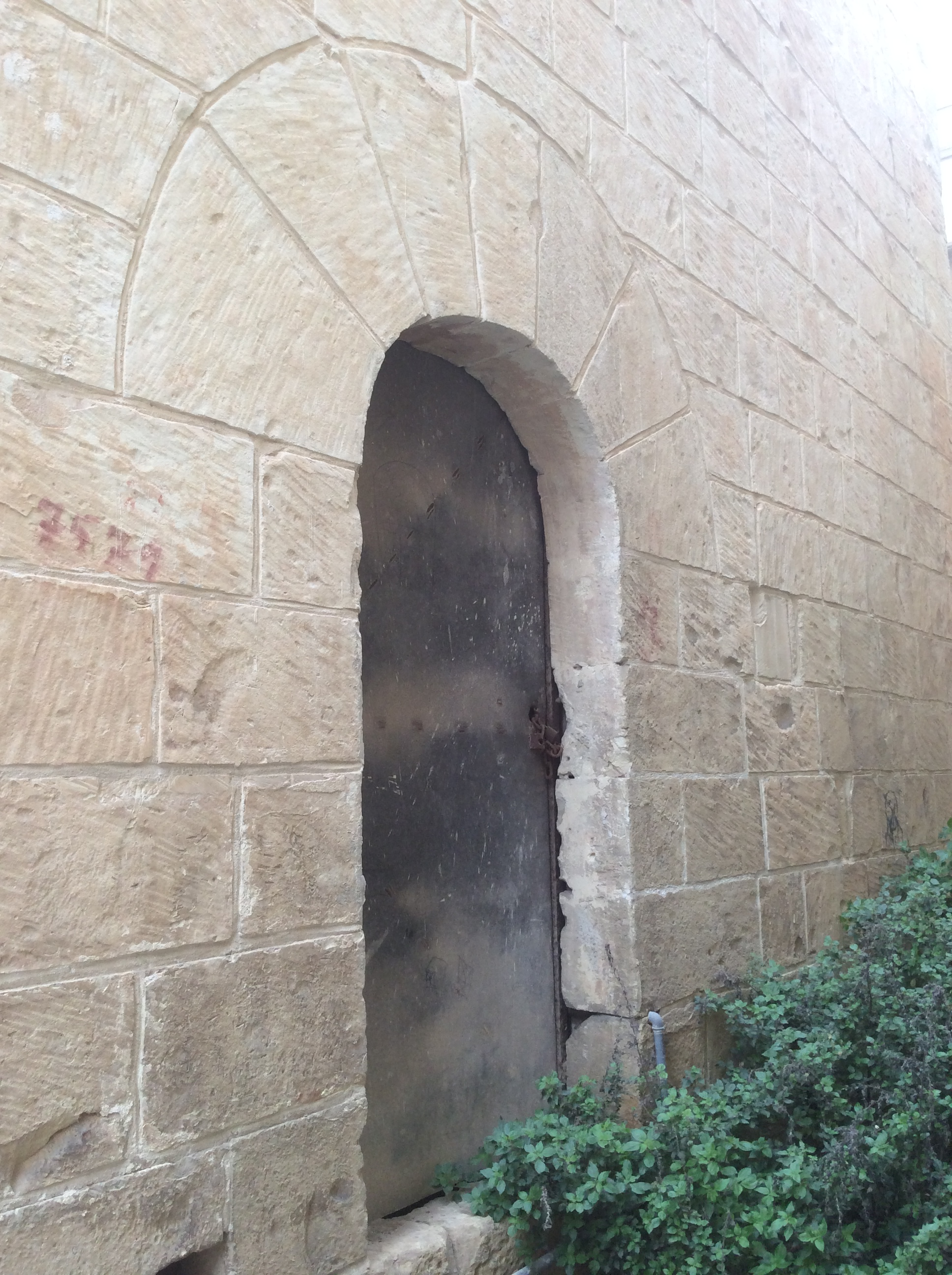
Entrance to the tower

The area where the tower is found was known as Għassiewi, meaning guarded place. Till the late 20th century, the community was known as Tal-Wejter. The nearby valley was known as Tal-Wejter Valley.

Tal-Wejter Tower was commissioned by Grand Master Ramon Perellos y Roccaful, and it was built in the early 18th century. The tower stood on the road leading from San Ġwann and St. Julian's to Birkirkara. This area is now built up and the tower is surrounded by modern buildings.

The tower was built to watch over the inland areas in the surrounding region of Birkirkara and to bridge the site of the Birkirkara Tower and Floriana. The project took place on the recommendations by Captain Foulet and Commander D'Argens, who were French knights of the Order of St. John.

Part of the tower was illegally demolished in 1968, but it was later rebuilt by the Società Dun Filippu Borgia. Today, the tower is still intact but it is deteriorating and it is feared that it might collapse. The building is privately owned, and it is currently for sale. It was scheduled as a Grade 2 national monument by the Malta Environment and Planning Authority in 2012.

== Architecture ==
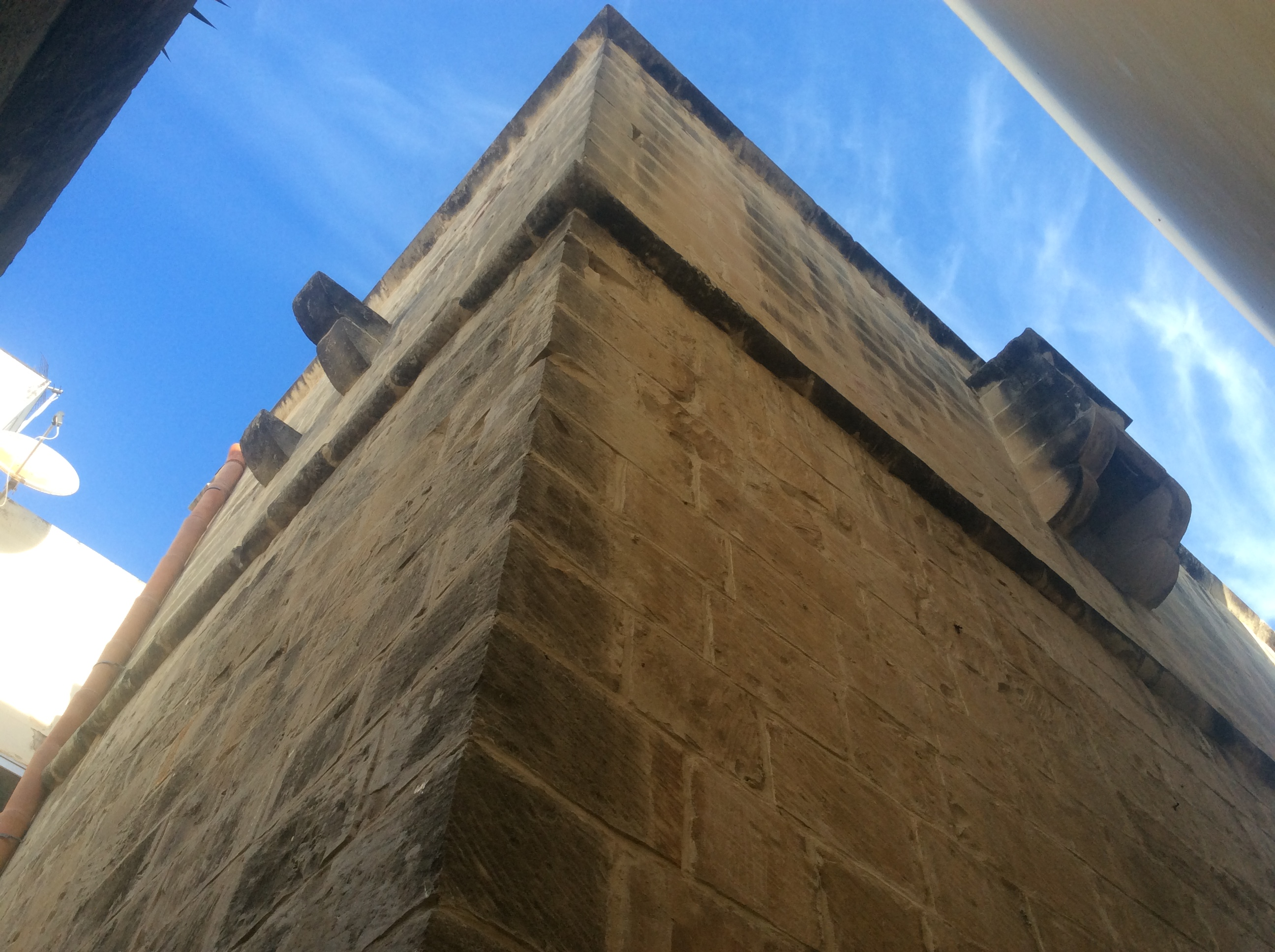
Western corner of the tower, with two machicolations visible

Tal-Wejter Tower was originally a two-story high tower with a high parapet wall at roof level. After being partially dismantled and rebuilt, a ceiling was added to the high wall and it now has three floors.

It has a square base, with a room on each of the three floors. The upper floor is separated by a moulded string course. Each façade of the tower originally had box machicolations. The entrance to the tower is through an arched doorway built in the medieval style. The building is now engulfed between later built housing residences. It is privately owned.

== See also ==
- Birkirkara Tower
