= Birkirkara Tower =

Tower in Birkirkara

- Torri ta' Birkirkara
- Birkirkara, Malta
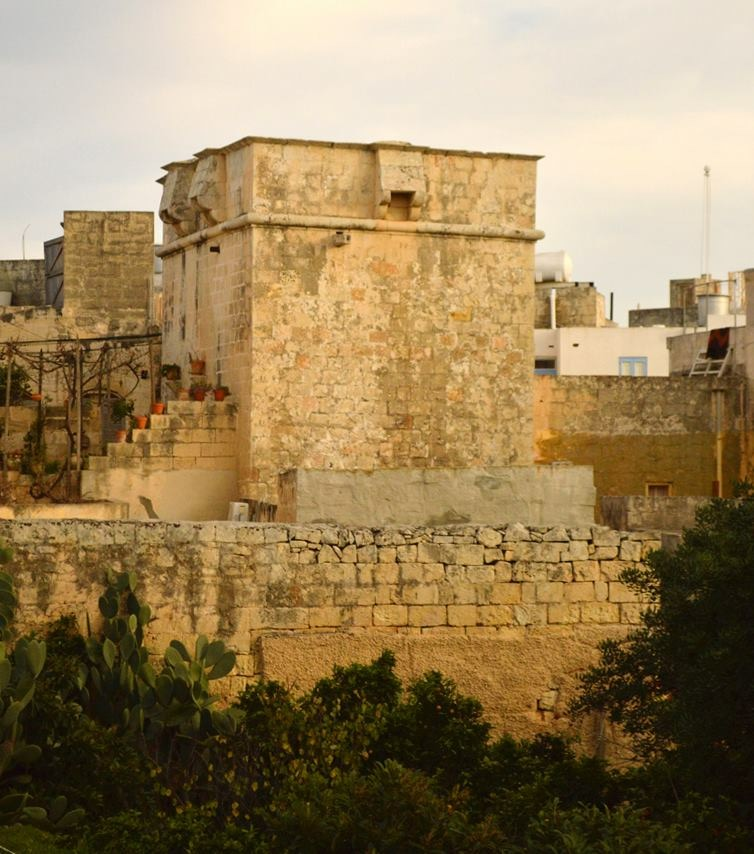
- View of Birkirkara Tower

Site information
- Type: Tower
- Owner: Private
- Open to the public: No
- Condition: Intact

Location
- Coordinates: 35°54′4.1″N 14°28′1.8″E

Site history
- Built: c. 16th century
- Materials: Limestone

The Birkirkara Tower (Maltese: Torri ta' Birkirkara), also known as Għar il-Ġobon Tower (Maltese: Torri ta' Għar il-Ġobon), is a tower in Birkirkara, Malta. Its date of construction is uncertain although it is thought to date from around the mid or late 16th century.

== History ==
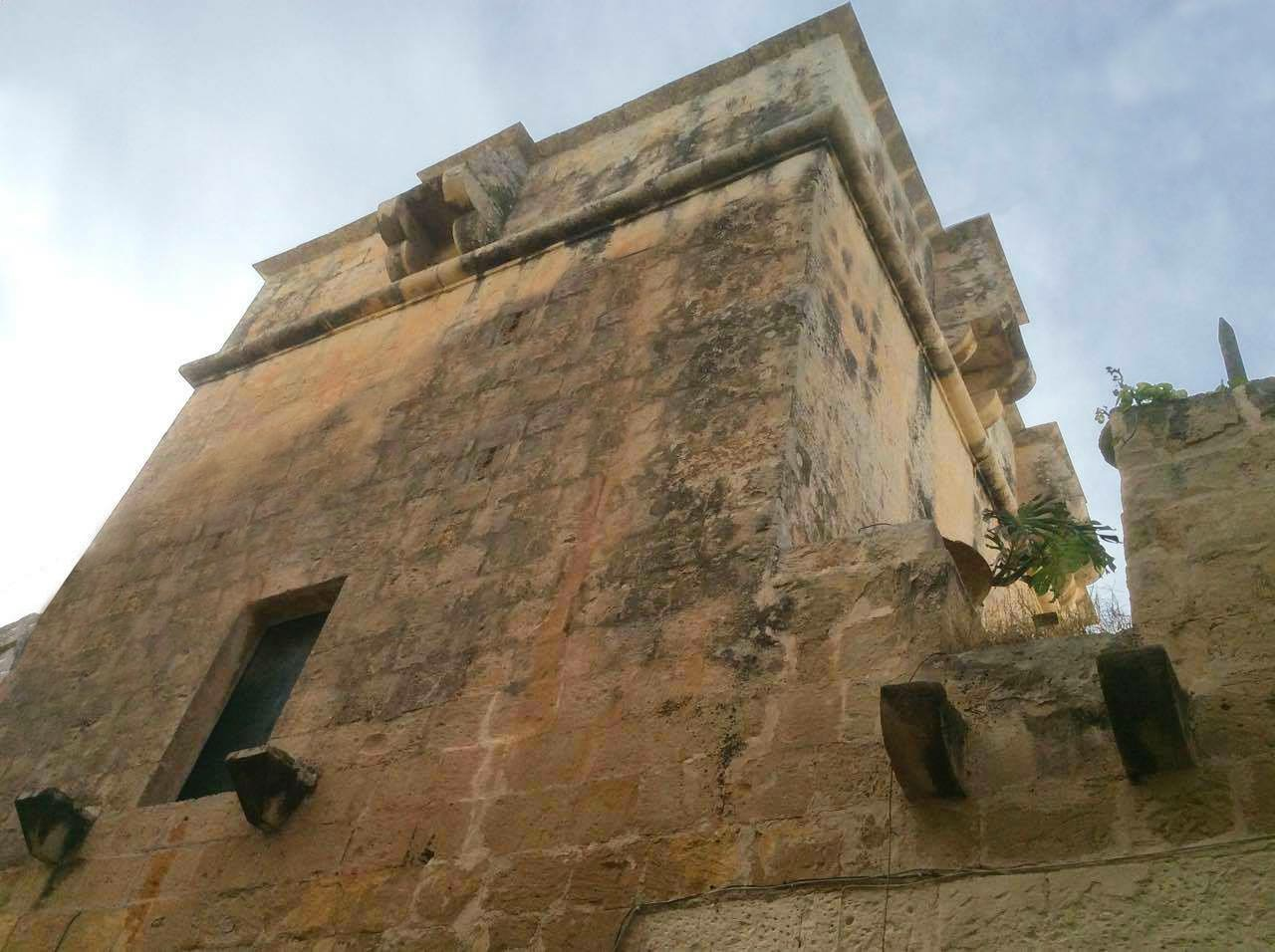
The tower as seen from Għar il-Ġobon Street

The tower was built for defensive purposes in the inland areas of Malta in the early periods of the Order of St. John. In the 17th century, as a lookout, the tower was aided with the building of another tower, the Tal-Wejter Tower, to better facilitate communication with Floriana.

The tower was included on the Antiquities List of 1925. It is now scheduled as a Grade 1 national monument by the Malta Environment and Planning Authority, and it is also listed on the National Inventory of the Cultural Property of the Maltese Islands.

== Architecture ==
Birkirkara Tower has a square plan, and its roof is surrounded by a high parapet wall. The latter contains six box machicolations; a pair at the left-side and two on the right-side, and one each at the front and back.

== See also ==
- Tal-Wejter Tower
