= Salvatore Gaffiero =

Maltese prelate (1828–1906)

His Excellency Salvatore Gaffiero
- Auxiliary Bishop of Malta
- Church: Roman Catholic
- See: Selymbria
- Appointed: 28 November 1898
- In office: 1899–1906
- Other post: Titular Bishop of Selymbria

Orders
- Ordination: 20 December 1851 by Publio Maria Sant
- Consecration: 15 January 1899 by Pietro Pace
- Rank: Bishop

Personal details
- Born: 8 March 1828 Senglea, Malta
- Died: 8 December 1906 (aged 78)
- Buried: St. Paul's Cathedral, Mdina

Salvatore Gaffiero (8 March 1828 – 8 December 1906) was a Maltese prelate who served as Auxiliary Bishop of Malta from 1899 until his death in 1906.

== Early days ==
Gaffiero was born in Senglea, Malta to Salvatore Gaffiero and Concetta Cachia. At the age of 12, he was appointed Canon of the Collegiate of Senglea.

== Priesthood ==
He was ordained to the priesthood by the Archbishop Publio Maria Sant on 20 December 1851 at St John's Co-Cathedral in Valletta. He joined the Oratorians of St Philip Neri in Senglea and was elected as their Provost for two different terms, serving the office between 1855 and 1858 and 1862 till 1865. In 1865 Gaffiero was appointed Parish Priest of Għargħur. Two years later, 1868, he was transferred as Parish Priest of Floriana. In 1875, he was appointed Canon of the Cathedral Chapter of Imdina. In 1885 the Diocese of Malta was administered by Monsignor Antonio Maria Buhagiar due to the illness that the bishop, Carmelo Scicluna, was suffering from. That year Buhagiar appointed Gaffiero as his Vicar General.

== Episcopacy ==
On 28 November 1898, Pope Leo XIII, on the advice of Archbishop Pietro Pace, appointed Gaffiero as the Auxiliary Bishop of Malta and Titular Bishop of Selymbria. Thus he was the second bishop from Senglea, the first being Ferdinando Mattei. He was consecrated on 15 January 1889 by Archbishop Pietro Pace in St John's Co-Cathedral, spending the remaining 7 years as bishop. He died on the feast of the Immaculate Conception in 1906.
