= Emanuel Galea =

Maltese bishop

His Excellency Servant of God Emanuel Galea
- Auxiliary Bishop of Malta
- Church: Roman Catholic Church
- See: Malta
- In office: 1942-1974
- Predecessor: Mauro Caruana
- Successor: Emanuele Gerada

Orders
- Ordination: July 5, 1942
- Consecration: June 9, 1942

Personal details
- Born: March 10, 1891 Senglea, Malta
- Died: August 21, 1974 (aged 83)

Sainthood
- Venerated in: Roman Catholic Church
- Title as Saint: Servant of God
- Attributes: Bishop's garments

Emanuel Galea, also spelled Emmanuele Galea, (March 10, 1891 – August 21, 1974) was a bishop of the Roman Catholic Church.

== Academic Achievements ==
The youngest son of Guzeppi and Karmela Galea (née Camilleri), Emanuel Galea was born in Senglea, Malta, on March 10, 1891. After his primary education, he studied at the Lyceum between 1903 and 1909. After his decision to become a priest, he entered the Major Seminary and enrolled at the Royal University of Malta in 1910. He obtained the degree of Bachelor of Literature and Bachelor of Canon Law and that of Doctor of Divinity. He was awarded the Certificate of Honour in the Theology Course. He was ordained priest together with his brother Francesco on 18 December 1915. Two years later he was appointed Canon Theologian of the Collegiate Church of Senglea. In 1919, after World War I, Canon Galea continued his postgraduate studies at the Gregorian University in Rome where he obtained a doctorate in Canon Law.

== Advancement in the church ==
On his return from Rome he was appointed Prefect of Studies and Professor of Latin Literature at the Archbishop's Seminary. Galea was the Prefect of Studies and Professor of Latin Literature at the Archbishop’s Seminary from 1921 till 1932. He became Professor of Canon Law at the Royal University of Malta from 1930 until 1942. Galea was installed Monsignor Theologian of the Cathedral Chapter, succeeding Monsignor Enrico Dandria. During the same year, Archbishop Caruana appointed him Secretary General at the Curia and Defender of the Bond of the Ecclesiastical Tribunal.

== Apostolic work ==
In 1940, during the period of high responsibilities in the Diocese, after the sudden death of Mgr Giuseppe Depiro, Archbishop Caruana asked him to become the Director of the Institute of Jesus of Nazareth at Zejtun, an orphanage run by the Missionary Sisters of Jesus of Nazareth, a post at which he fulfilled his ambition to help the poor children and the needy until his death.

During the same time he continued with his mission of hearing confessions regularly in Senglea, Zejtun and Tarxien where he joined his elder brother parish priest Salvatore. He dedicated himself to direct the newly born Congregation and to the apostolate of preaching on all occasions offered to him, and taking active part in the popular missions held by the Missjoni ż-Żgħira. (The Minor Missionary Movement)

== Further responsibilities ==
During the most critical moments for Malta in World War II, on 9 June 1942, at the request of the old Archbishop Mauro Caruana, Pope Pius XII appointed Mgr Emanuel Galea Titular Bishop of Tralles in Asia and Auxiliary Bishop of Malta. He was ordained bishop by Archbishop Caruana assisted by Bishop Mikiel Gonzi (at that time Bishop of Gozo) at the Cathedral in Mdina on 5 July 1942.

Along with his duties at a high level of responsibility in Malta, Bishop Galea took part in a number of sessions of the Second Vatican Council that lasted from 1962 until 1965. He addressed the plenary and the individual specialized sessions in a masterly way and contributed especially to the discussions on the Episcopal Collegiality and on the role of the Church in the modern world.

== Later life ==
He enjoyed visiting parishes all over Malta to confer the Sacrament of Confirmation, to install new parish priests and to take part in the liturgical celebrations of the parish titular feasts. He accepted joyfully to deliver Lenten sermons to all different sections wherever he was invited.

== Honors ==
In 1965, on the 50th Anniversary of his ordination to the priesthood, on the recommendation of Archbishop Gonzi, Pope Paul VI appointed Bishop Galea Assistant to the Papal Throne.

== His last years ==
Bishop Emanuel Galea continued his pastoral activities to the last days of his life; he died on 21 August 1974. He lies in a sarcophagus at the Jesus of Nazareth Institute.
