= Giovanni Maria Camilleri =

Maltese prelate

The Right Reverend Giovanni Maria Camilleri O.S.A.
- Bishop of Gozo
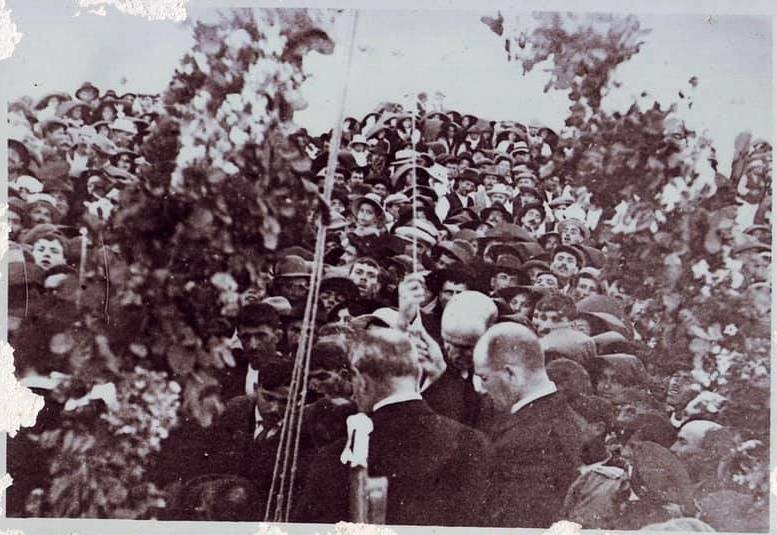
- Bishop Camilleri presiding over the foundation-laying ceremony of Ta' Pinu Sanctuary on 30 May 1920 (Photo Mikiel Farrugia)
- Church: Roman Catholic
- Diocese: Gozo
- Appointed: 11 February 1889
- In office: 1889-1924
- Predecessor: Pietro Pace
- Successor: Mikiel Gonzi
- Other post: Titular Bishop of Methone

Orders
- Ordination: 21 December 1867
- Consecration: 24 February 1889 by Mariano Rampolla
- Rank: Bishop

Personal details
- Born: March 15, 1843 Valletta, Malta
- Died: December 7, 1925 (aged 82) Rabat, Malta

Giovanni Maria Camilleri (15 March 1843 – 7 December 1925) was a Maltese prelate who became the fourth bishop of Gozo.

== Life ==
Camilleri was born in Valletta, Malta on March 15, 1843. At the age of 24 he was ordained priest of the Order of St Augustine. On February 11, 1889 Pope Leo XIII appointed Camilleri to the vacant see of Gozo to succeed Pietro Pace who was appointed as bishop of Malta. He was consecrated on February 24, 1889, by Cardinal Mariano Rampolla in the Basilica of Sant'Agostino in Rome. On May 12 he was installed as the fourth bishop of Gozo in the cathedral of the diocese. On January 21, 1924 Pope Pius XI accepted the resignation of Bishop Camilleri as bishop of Gozo and was appointed as Titular Bishop of Methone. On December 7, 1925, Camilleri died in Rabat, Malta at the age of 82.

== See also ==
- Catholic Church in Malta
