= Angelo Portelli =

20th-century Catholic bishop

His Excellency Angelo Portelli
- Auxiliary Bishop of Malta
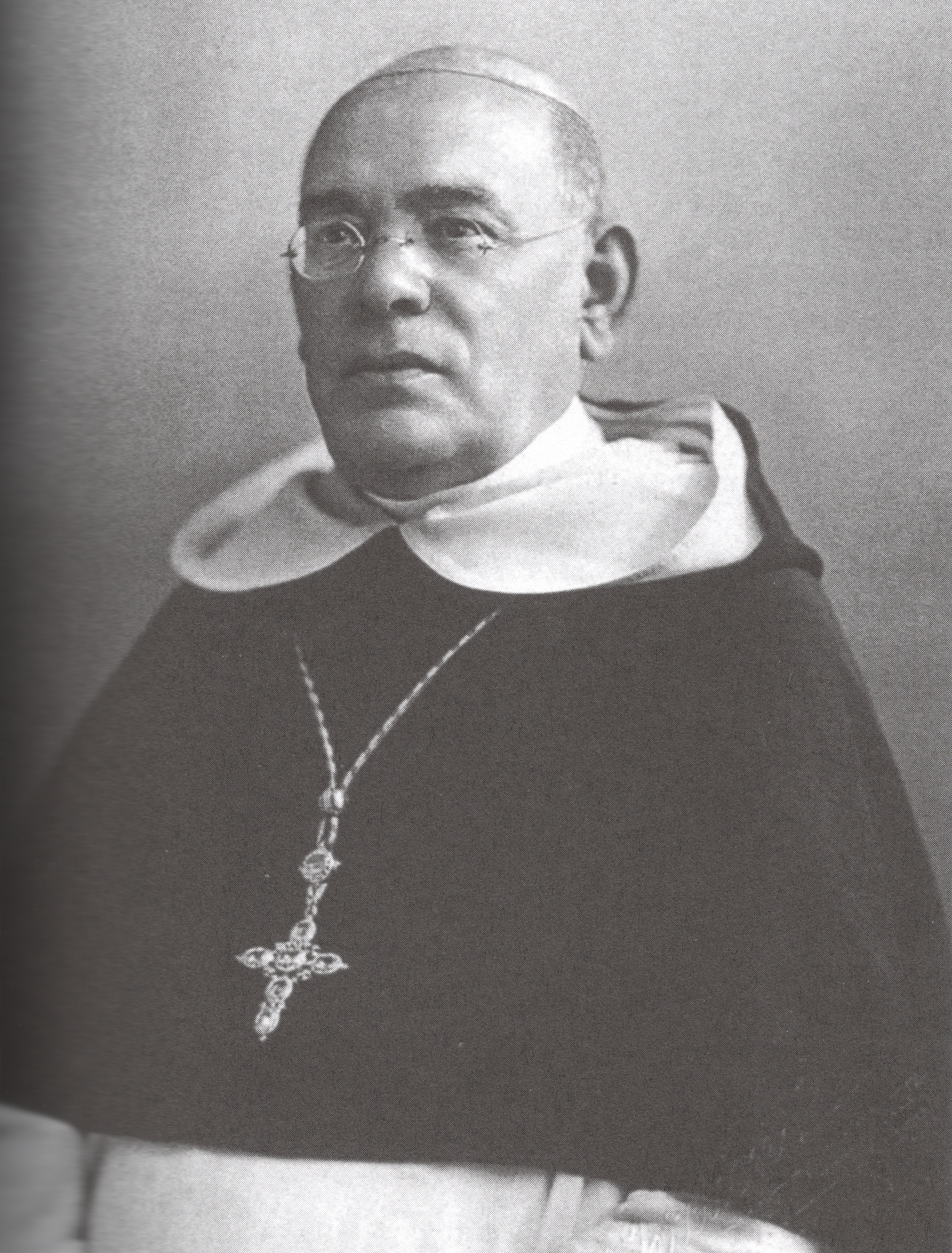
- Diocese: Malta
- See: Malta
- Installed: 14 May 1911
- Term ended: 19 June 1927
- Predecessor: Mons Attard

Orders
- Ordination: 29 November 1874
- Consecration: 14 May 1911

Personal details
- Born: Savior Portelli; 24 April 1852 Valletta, Malta
- Died: 19 June 1927 (aged 75) Valletta, Malta
- Buried: Our Lady of the Grotto Church, Malta
- Denomination: Catholic
- Residence: Saint Dominic's Street, Valletta
- Parents: Ċikku Portelli, Marintonn Vella
- Education: Saint Thomas Aquinas College, Rabat
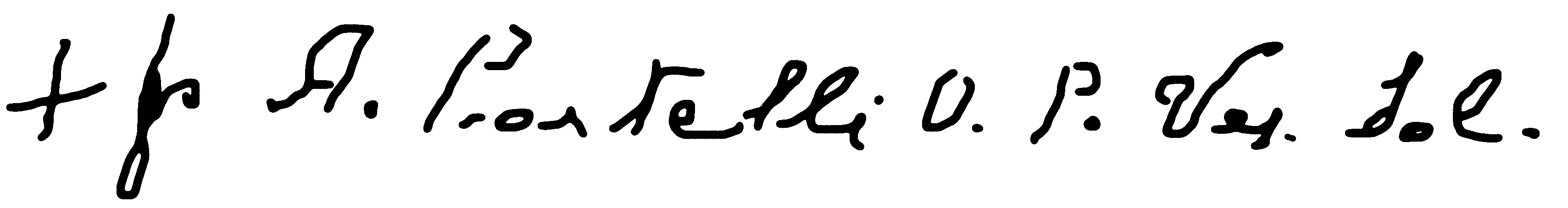
- Signature

Angelo Portelli, O.P. (born Francis Saviour Portelli; 24 April 1852 – 19 June 1927), to Francis and Mary Vella in Valletta. He entered the Dominican Order in the Dominican Church in Rabat on 3 February 1868, receiving the religious name Angelo. Fra Angelo lived in the Convent of Our Lady of the Grotto in Rabat. After he finished his novitiate year he professed on 3 February 1869. He finished all his studies in philosophy and theology at the Dominican College, Saint Thomas Aquinas in Rabat; in the year 1874 he was ordained priest and, two years following, he took the title of Lecturer of Theology.

== Study and early life ==
Portelli started immediately his career as a scholar at Saint Thomas’ College, in Rabat; during the years 1876-1882 and 1885-1892 he taught philosophy, theology and the Holy Scripture; during the years 1887-1892 he was Regent of Studies whilst being a master of the novice and students in Rabat as well. In the year 1891 he graduated as Master of Theology. While he was still teaching, the Dominican friars of Vittoriosa, in 1883, elected him as their prior; he did not accept this office whole heartedly in fact he resigned before his term was over. Then he went back to teaching at Saint Thomas’ College in Rabat.

Father Portelli was a most righteous religious who loved the convent life, studying and preaching; it was for this reason that as soon as he finished his teaching career, in 1893, he was assigned in the Our Lady of Porto Salvo convent in Valletta. During the years 1896–1902, he was the parish priest, of the Parish of Porto Salvo. Living at the Valletta's convent made it easier for father Angelo to reach out other cities and villages and could thus accept more preaching invitations; he was able to preach any sort of sermons; panegyric; lent sermons; conferences; and other sort of sermons for special occasions. He did not only do sermons in Malta but also in various Italian cities.

== Bishop ==
Father Portelli was also very helpful to the Maltese Dioceses; he was an examiner and magistrate at the curia, he was an examiner of philosophy of the Archbishop's seminary; and member of the Diocesan Commission against Modernism. In the year 1910 he was appointed as an Apostolic Visitor to all the Nun's Congregations in Malta and Gozo; he finished this assignment at the end of the same year. His acquaintance, his discretion and his ability sustained the faith of the ecclesiastical authorities in him; it could be for this reason that, in 1911, he was appointed as a Titular Bishop of Selinonte and Auxiliary Bishop of Malta.

Father Angelo Portelli was consecrated bishop on 14 May 1911; he was offered great help as an Auxiliary Bishop to Mgr. P. Pace who was an old man at that time. After his death in 1914, Bishop Portelli was appointed as Apostolic Administrator to the Maltese Dioceses until, Dom Mauro Caruana was appointed as Bishop of Malta in 1915. During his career, Bishop Portelli made sure of helping people from all type of social class; it was for this reason that he won so much the people's sympathy and was loved by everyone.

== Death ==
Mgr. Porelli died on 19 June 1927, in his personal house, very near to the Dominican convent. The following day he was laid in the Oratory of Good Teaching, very near to his former house, where the faithful could pay their last respect. In the morning of 21 June 1927 he was taken to the church of Our Lady of Porto Salvo where a solemn funeral was held, to which the highest authorities of the Church and civil and state authorities attended; in the afternoon, a corteo made up of various distinct personalities took the body of the bishop from the Church of Our Lady of Porto Salvo to City Gate. The funeral came to an end at the Church of Our Lady of The Grotto; where he was buried in a reserved grave in the Dominican Church in Rabat.
