= Francesco Saverio Caruana =

Maltese bishop (1759–1847)

His Excellency Francesco Saverio Caruana
- Bishop of Malta
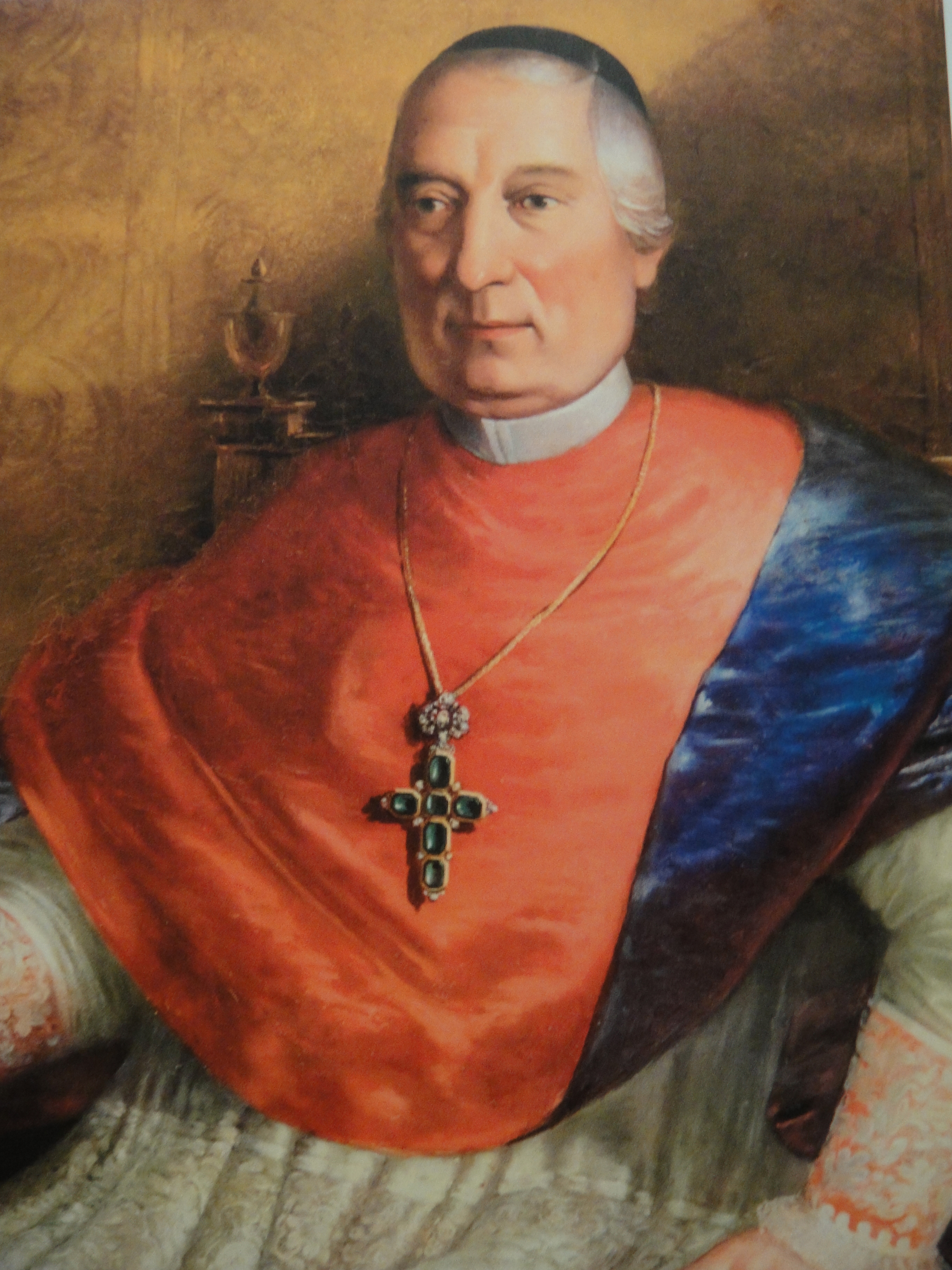
- Church: Roman Catholic
- Diocese: Malta
- Appointed: 28 February 1831
- Installed: 21 June 1831
- Term ended: 17 November 1847
- Predecessor: Ferdinando Mattei
- Successor: Publio Maria Sant

Orders
- Ordination: 20 December 1783 by Vincenzo Labini
- Consecration: 15 May 1831 by Publio Maria Sant
- Rank: Bishop

Personal details
- Born: 7 July 1759 Żebbuġ, Hospitaller Malta
- Died: 17 November 1847 (aged 88)
- Buried: St. Paul's Cathedral, Mdina

Francesco Saverio Caruana (7 July 1759 – 17 November 1847) was a Maltese prelate who was Bishop of Malta from 1831 to his death in 1847. He was also a rebel leader during the Maltese uprising of 1798–1800.

Caruana was born in Żebbuġ on 7 July 1759. At the age of 24, he was ordained priest by Archbishop Vincenzo Labini, and in 1796 he became canon of the Mdina Cathedral chapter. During the French occupation of Malta Canon Caruana was made a member of the Commission de gouvernement (Government commission) but resigned some time later when he saw that he could not prevent the French from establishing unjust laws and when they started stealing precious artifices from the Maltese churches. Canon Caruana played a prominent role in the Maltese uprising against the French and in bringing the British to Malta. During the revolt, he was the commander of the battalions of Żebbuġ and Siġġiewi. Tas-Samra camp and battery fell under his overall command.

In 1822 Caruana was nominated as the cathedral archdeacon and in 1829 he was appointed diocesan administrator upon the death of Bishop Ferdinando Mattei. Two years later, Pope Gregory XVI appointed him as the successor of Mattei; he was consecrated on 15 May 1831 by Publio Maria Sant, who would eventually become his successor in 1847.

Pope Gregory wrote to him in 1843 outlining his concerns that Caruana's diocese was being plagued by secret societies of the kind which he and several previous Popes had condemned for their corruption, error and undesirable influence on the young, calling on him "by means of pastoral letters, edicts, and admonitions" to protect the Maltese Catholic population from their opinions.

Bishop Caruana died in 1847, at the age of 88, after 16 years as bishop.
