= Curmi =

Curmi is a surname. Notable people with the surname include:

- Alessandro Curmi (1801–1857), Maltese composer and pianist
- Francesca Curmi (born 2002), Maltese tennis player
- Joseph Galea-Curmi (born 1964), Maltese clergyman and Catholic auxiliary bishop

== See also ==
- Curmi, an early beer brewed in the UK
- Qormi
