= Paolo Rosario Farrugia =

Maltese prelate (1836-1907)

His Excellency Paolo Rosario Farrugia
- Auxiliary Bishop of Malta
- Church: Roman Catholic
- Appointed: 3 June 1907
- Term ended: 21 December 1907
- Other post: Titular Bishop of Hamatha

Orders
- Ordination: 17 December 1859
- Consecration: 7 July 1907 by Rafael Merry del Val
- Rank: Bishop

Personal details
- Born: 22 August 1836 Xagħra Gozo, Malta
- Died: 21 December 1907 (aged 71)

Paolo Rosario Farrugia (22 August 1836 – 21 December 1907) was a Maltese prelate who became the Auxiliary Bishop of Malta in 1907.

== Biography ==
Ruzar Farrugia was born in Xagħra, Gozo, Malta on 22 August 1836. He was ordained a priest of the Diocese of Malta on 17 December 1859 at the age of 23. Forty eight years later Pope Pius X appointed Farrugia as the Auxiliary Bishop of Malta in order to assist Bishop Pietro Pace. He was given the titular see of Hamatha. Farrugia was consecrated by the Spanish cardinal Rafael Merry del Val on 7 July 1907. In December the same year Bishop Farrugia died, after only five months as bishop, at the age of 71.
