= Gaetano Pace Forno =

Maltese archbishop

His Excellency Gaetano Pace Forno O.S.A.
- Bishop of Malta
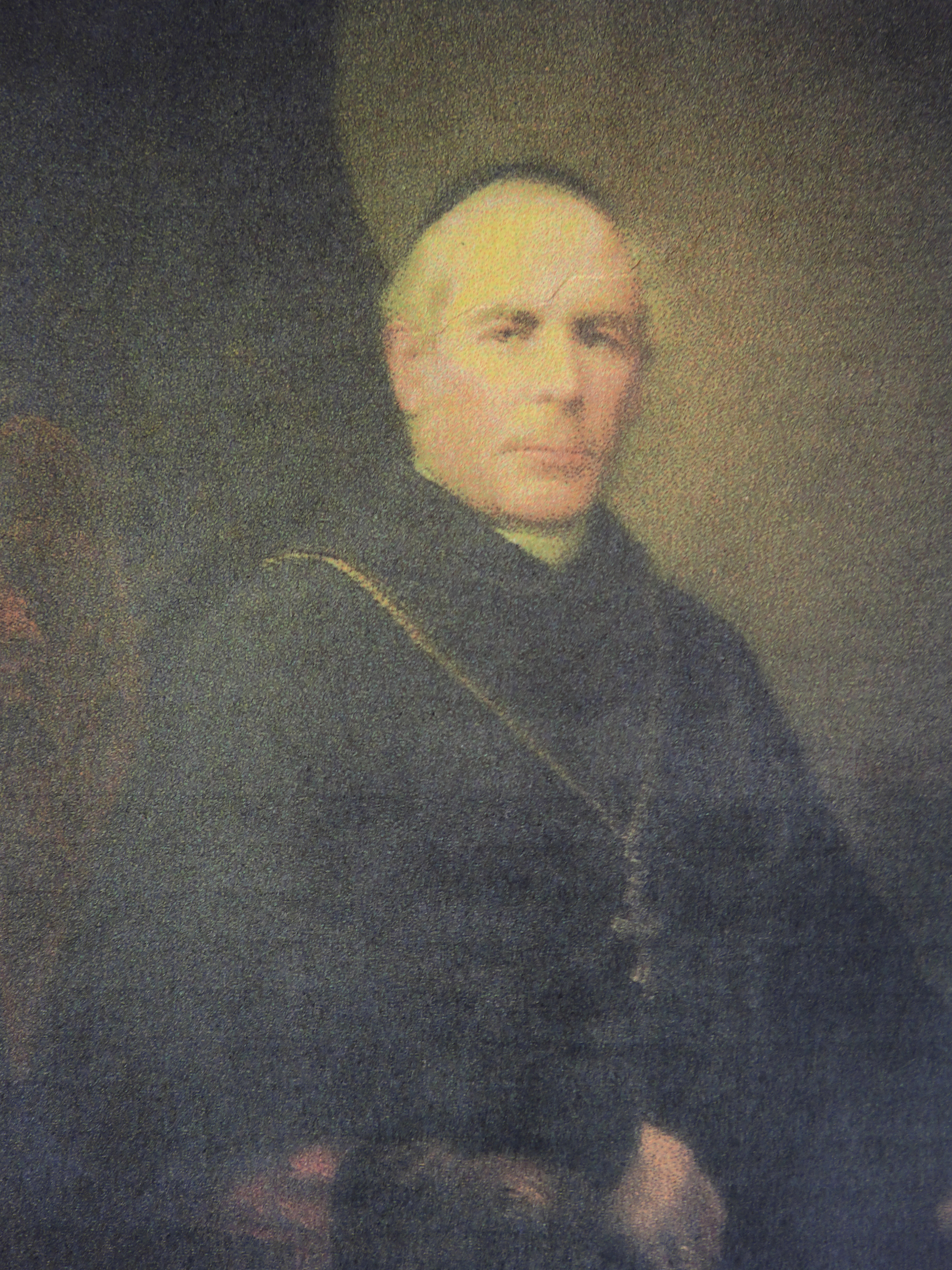
- Church: Roman Catholic
- Diocese: Malta
- Appointed: 4 December 1857
- In office: 1858-1874
- Predecessor: Publio Maria Sant
- Successor: Carmelo Scicluna
- Other post: Titular Archbishop of Rhodus

Orders
- Ordination: 22 September 1832
- Consecration: 4 October 1857 by Costantino Patrizi Naro
- Rank: Archbishop

Personal details
- Born: 5 June 1808 Victoria, Gozo Malta
- Died: 22 July 1874 (aged 66)

Gaetano Pace Forno (5 June 1809 – 22 July 1874) was a Maltese Archbishop who became the Bishop of Malta after his predecessor Archbishop Publio Maria dei Conti Sant tendered his resignation.

== Biography ==
Pace Forno was born in Victoria, Gozo on 5 June 1809 to a lawyer Francesco Pace and the Noble Lucia dei Baroni Forno. He was baptized on the same day at St George's basilica. On 20 July 1824 he was professed as a member of the Order of Saint Augustine. He was ordained priest in Naples in 1832. He spent a great number of years as an educator in Italy until 30 May 1847, when he was chosen Provincial of the Maltese Augustinian Province. He is also considered as the founder of the college for boys at the Valletta convent which opened on 23 September 1848. On 11 December 1854 he was chosen Provincial for a second term.

On 25 September 1857 Pace Forno was appointed as the Coadjutor Bishop of Malta to assist Archbishop Sant. He was ordained bishop on October 4 by Costantino Patrizi Naro the Cardinal Bishop of Albano. Just two months later he succeeded as the Bishop of Malta with the titular title of Archbishop of Rhodes. Archbishop Gaetano Pace Forno is mostly remembered in Ħamrun as the founder of the name of the parish in the same village. The chosen patron saint of Ħamrun was Saint Cajetan, Archbishop Pace Forno's own patron saint. In 1864 the Maltese diocese was divided into two when the Diocese of Gozo was erected by Pope Pius IX. Thus Gozo became as suffragan to Malta. He died on 22 July 1874 having served as Bishop of Malta for 16 years.

He is related to Sir Pietro Pace, and his heirs, the Camilleri Pace-De-Ciotta's of Victoria, Gozo including Doctor of Laws Frank-Luke Matthias Attard [Stuart] Camilleri [Pace-De-Ciotta].

== See also ==
- Catholic Church in Malta
