= Emanuele Gerada =

Maltese prelate and diplomat

His Excellency Dr. Emanuele Gerada
- Titular Archbishop of Nomentum
- Church: Roman Catholic Church
- See: Titular See of Nomentum
- In office: 1967–2011
- Predecessor: none
- Successor: none

Orders
- Ordination: 1 August 1943 by Emanuel Galea
- Consecration: 18 June 1967 by Mikiel Gonzi
- Rank: Archbishop

Personal details
- Born: 18 May 1920 Żejtun, Malta
- Died: 21 January 2011 (aged 90)

Styles of Emanuele Gerada
- Reference style: The Most Reverend
- Spoken style: Your Excellency
- Religious style: Monsignor
- Posthumous style: not applicable

Emanuele Gerada KC*HS (18 May 1920 – 21 January 2011) was a Maltese prelate of the Roman Catholic Church, a Vatican diplomat and titular Archbishop of Nomentum. One Maltese obituary recalled him as "a generous, well-read and intelligent man."

== Biography ==
Gerada was born in Malta and ordained a priest on 1 August 1943 for the Archdiocese of Malta. He studied in Rome for a doctorate in canon law and joined the Vatican's diplomatic service, in which he served for most of his career.

He was appointed auxiliary bishop of the Archdiocese of Malta (then to Coadjutor Archbishop in 1968) and titular Bishop of Nomentum on 15 February 1967 and was consecrated on 18 June 1967. A former priest-secretary recalled at the time of his death that one of Gerada's achievements was an improvement in the relations between the Maltese Church and the Labour Party. Such had been the deterioration in the relationship that Catholic Labour members of the party executive were denied burial in the consecrated section of cemeteries and voting Labour was declared a mortal sin. But Gerada negotiated an agreement acceptable to both sides.

Gerada resumed his diplomatic career with the Holy See when he was appointed apostolic nuncio to El Salvador and Guatemala on 8 November 1973. In this post he was said to lobby for the appointment of Archbishop Oscar Romero but Gerada later objected when Romero cancelled many Sunday masses after the state-sponsored murder of Jesuit priest Fr Rutilio Grande in 1977.

On 15 October 1980 he was appointed apostolic pro-nuncio to Pakistan and served until his appointment as Apostolic Nuncio to Ireland on 4 February 1989. His arrival in Ireland was greeted warmly coming after the rather austere and conservative Archbishop Gaetano Alibrandi. Gerada played a key role when the Vatican attempted to silence Bishop Brendan Comiskey because of his views on priestly celibacy. Later reports said a priest with suspicions about the deviant behaviour of Fr Brendan Smyth wrote to Archbishop Gerada.

Gerada retired on 17 October 1995 and died on 21 January 2011.

== See also ==
- Archdiocese of Malta
