= Cebarades =

Africa Proconsularis (125 AD)

Cebarades (in Latin Rite Cebaradesensis) was a Roman–Berber civitas in the province of Byzacena in modern Tunisia.

The town was the seat of an ancient Roman Catholic bishopric. Its diocese is now a titular bishopric. The current bishop is Joseph Galea-Curmi, auxiliary bishop of Malta
