= Retreat houses in Malta =

The first retreat house in Malta was constructed by the Jesuits in Floriana in 1751. Today the structure forms part of the Archbishop’s Curia. There are several places for spiritual retreats in Malta.

== Retreat ==
Many Catholics and other Christians regularly engage in spiritual retreats to follow the example of Jesus going to a solitary place to spend time in prayer (such as in Mark 1:35). Retreats may take many forms, spread over a day, a weekend, or longer away from home and familiar routines, under the direction of a priest or lay spiritual director, featuring talks, reflections, and time for personal prayer. Keeping a journal may help to further enhance the spiritual experience.

Spiritual retreats were formalised in their current structure by St. Ignatius of Loyola (1491–1556), in his Spiritual Exercises. Ignatius was later to be made patron saint of spiritual retreats by Pope Pius XI in 1922. The Spiritual Exercises is a collection of meditations and reflections to enhance one's connection with God that guides the person on a religious retreat through a series of contemplative practices with the assistance of an experienced spiritual director. Traditionally, a retreat based on the Spiritual Exercises requires a month of silent prayer and meditation in a retreat centre, although one can also be undertaken over the course of approximately nine months "in daily life" through daily prayer, readings and meditations, together with periodic meetings with the spiritual director.

(See also main page on spiritual retreats.)

== Historical Background ==
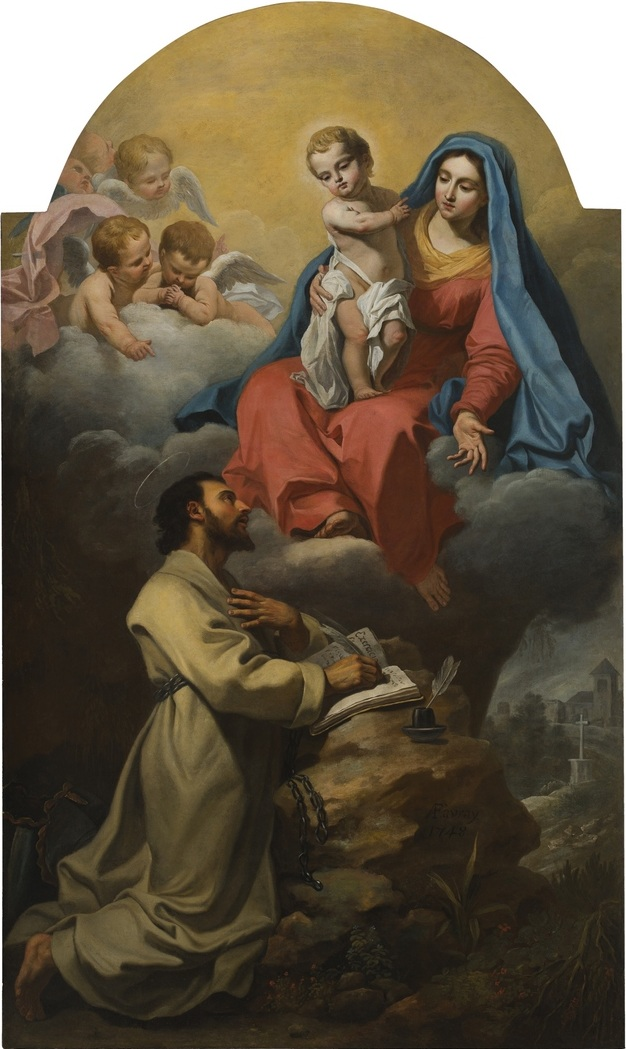
The titular painting of St Ignatius of Loyola writing ‘The Spiritual Exercises’ by Antoine de Favray (1748)

Jesuit Fra Pier Francesco Rosignoli arrived in Malta in 1742 and started giving spiritual retreats in Valletta modelled after St. Ignatius of Loyola's Spiritual Exercises. These retreats encouraged participants to reflect profoundly on their lives and spiritual readiness for death by focusing on meditations on sin, the life of Christ, His Passion, and His Resurrection. Looking for more peaceful settings, Fra Rosignoli, with the assistance of Maltese donors and members of the Order of St. John, especially Portuguese knights, began the construction of Malta's first retreat house in Floriana. Rosignoli himself made a personal annual contribution by allocating 200 scudi. Pedro III (Infante) of Portugal, who had received his early education from the Jesuits, also contributed significantly, commemorated by a marble plaque dated 1749 featuring his coat of arms above the main door of the chapel. On March 16, 1751, the Holy House of Our Lady of Manresa in Floriana was blessed by Paul Alphéran de Bussan, the Bishop of Malta, in a ceremony also attended by Manuel Pinto de Fonseca.

Antoine de Favray decorated the chapel with the titular painting featuring St Ignatius of Loyola writing ‘The Spiritual Exercises’ during his time of discernment in Manresa, under the maternal gaze of the Virgin Mary and her son Jesus. He also produced four paintings for the lateral altars and two ovals centred on the themes of discernment and good death, reinforcing the spiritual ethos of Casa Manresa. An image of God the Father once adorned the chapel’s dome before the current lantern was constructed.

The diocesan clergy administered it after the Jesuits' expulsion in 1768. Subsequently, the building was used as a seminary and now the structure forms part of the Archbishop’s Curia.

== List of current retreat places in the Maltese Islands ==
The following is a list of retreat places in the Maltese Islands:

Malta
Name	Location	Run by	Capacity
Christ the Shepherd	Tal-Virtu, Rabat	Archbishop’s Seminary	98 *
Mount St Joseph Retreat House	Targa Gap, Mosta	Jesuits	78
Dar il-Ħanin Samaritan	Santa Venera	M.U.S.E.U.M.	60
Retreat House	Tas-Silġ, Marsaxlokk	Discalced Carmelites	55
La Salle Centre	Mellieha	De La Salle Brothers	54 *
Rivotorto Retreat House	Birkirkara	Centru Animazzjoni u Komunikazzjoni (ĊAK) Conventual Franciscans	47
ŻAK House & Flatlet	Birkirkara	Żgħażagħ Azzjoni Kattolika (ŻAK)	44
Savio College	Dingli	Salesians	37
Chapel of Christ Our Saviour (Kappella ta' Santu Kristu)	Għaxaq	Ghaxaq parish	30 *
Lunzjata Retreat House	Rabat	Carmelites	30
St Joseph Retreat House	Rabat	Sisters of St Joseph	28
Sala Marija Ewkaristika	Żebbuġ	Fergha Ewkaristika	26
* shared			

Gozo
Name	Location	Run by	Capacity
Manresa Retreat House	Victoria	Jesuits	48
Stella Maris House	Żebbuġ	Missionary Society of St Paul	37
Dar Madre Teresa Spinelli	Għajnsielem	Augustinian Sisters	32

== Mount St. Joseph Retreat House Shooting Range Controversy ==
Mount St. Joseph Retreat House, located in Mosta, became the focal point of considerable controversy following a proposal to construct a shooting range nearby. The proposal faced significant resistance from the local community and environmental organisations, reflecting broader concerns about development practices in Malta under the Labour Party's administration.

Mount St. Joseph Retreat House is a Jesuit-run facility known for its serene environment, offering a conducive environment for contemplation and spiritual retreats for roughly ten thousand people annually, since 1964. In 2015, a consortium named U-Group proposed to develop a shooting range at a disused military installation in Tal-Busbesija, Mosta. The project intended to repurpose the derelict site for target shooting activities. The initiative swiftly incited resistance from the Jesuit community and local residents expressing concerns regarding the noise and disruption the shooting range would generate, undermining the tranquillity of the retreat house and nearby residential areas. The Mosta local council conducted public meetings and hearings, during which citizens expressed their complaints.

The controversy underscored growing concerns about environmental issues and corruption in Malta. Public demonstrations and appeals for planning reform intensified, as citizens insisted on measures to safeguard Malta's environment and guarantee transparent development practices. The proposal for the shooting range near Mount St. Joseph Retreat House was ultimately dropped due to due diligence failures, marking one of the few victories for the local community and environmental advocates.
