= Ferdinando Mattei =

Maltese prelate

His Excellency Ferdinando Mattei
- Archbishop of Rhodes and Bishop of Malta
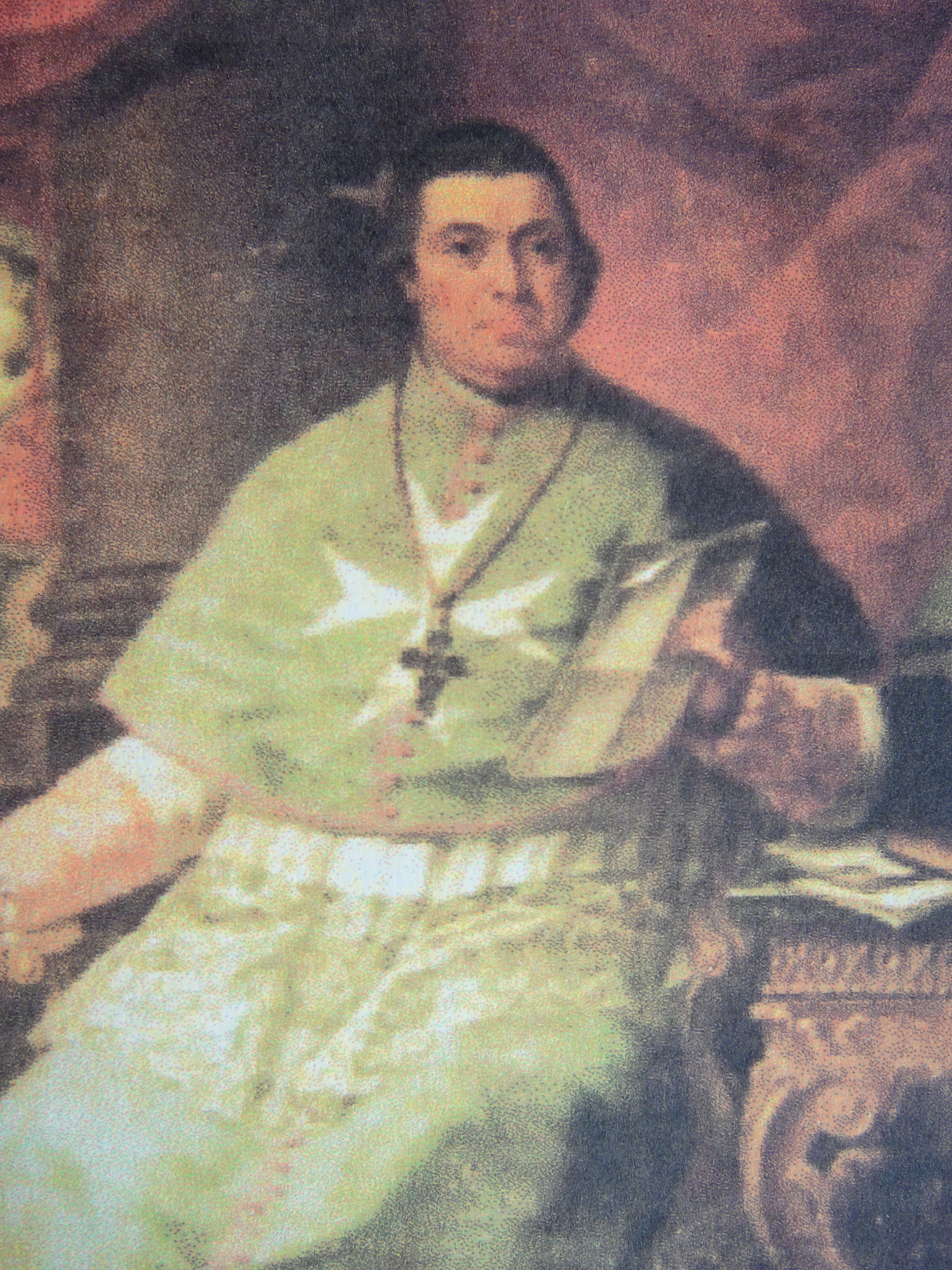
- Church: Roman Catholic
- Diocese: Malta
- In office: 1807–1829
- Predecessor: Vincenzo Labini
- Successor: Francesco Saverio Caruana
- Opposed to: Francesco Saverio Caruana
- Previous post: Titular Bishop of Paphus (1805-1807)

Orders
- Consecration: 1806 by Publio Maria Sant
- Rank: Bishop

Personal details
- Born: 24 July 1761 Senglea Malta
- Died: 14 July 1829 (aged 67)
- Buried: St. Paul's Cathedral, Mdina

Ferdinando Mattei (24 July 1761 – 14 July 1829) was a Maltese prelate who was appointed bishop of Malta in 1807 and Archbishop of Rhodes (before the year 1823).

Mattei was born in Senglea Malta on 24 July 1761. After being ordained priest, Mattei was appointed as one of the knights of St John's Conventual Chaplains because of the high regard they had for him. After the knights were expelled from the island by the French, Mattei worked with the Maltese and avoided any contact with the French. After the French left Malta the British looked with favor upon him.

In 1803 Mattei was appointed as a Monsignor of the Cathedral and on 23 December 1805 Pope Pius VIII appointed him as titular Bishop of Paphos. This entitled the new bishop to help Bishop Labini in running the diocese. In 1818 he ordained bishop Publio Maria Sant the Titular Bishop of Laranda. On 18 September 1807, Bishop Mattei was himself appointed as the new bishop of Malta after the death of Bishop Labini. He was opposed by Francesco Saverio Caruana who himself wanted to be bishop of Malta. Mattei died on 14 July 1829, at age 67, and Caruana would eventually succeed him.
