= Tas-Samra Battery =

Artillery battery in Ħamrun, Malta

- Batterija tas-Samra
- Part of the French blockade batteries
- Ħamrun, Malta
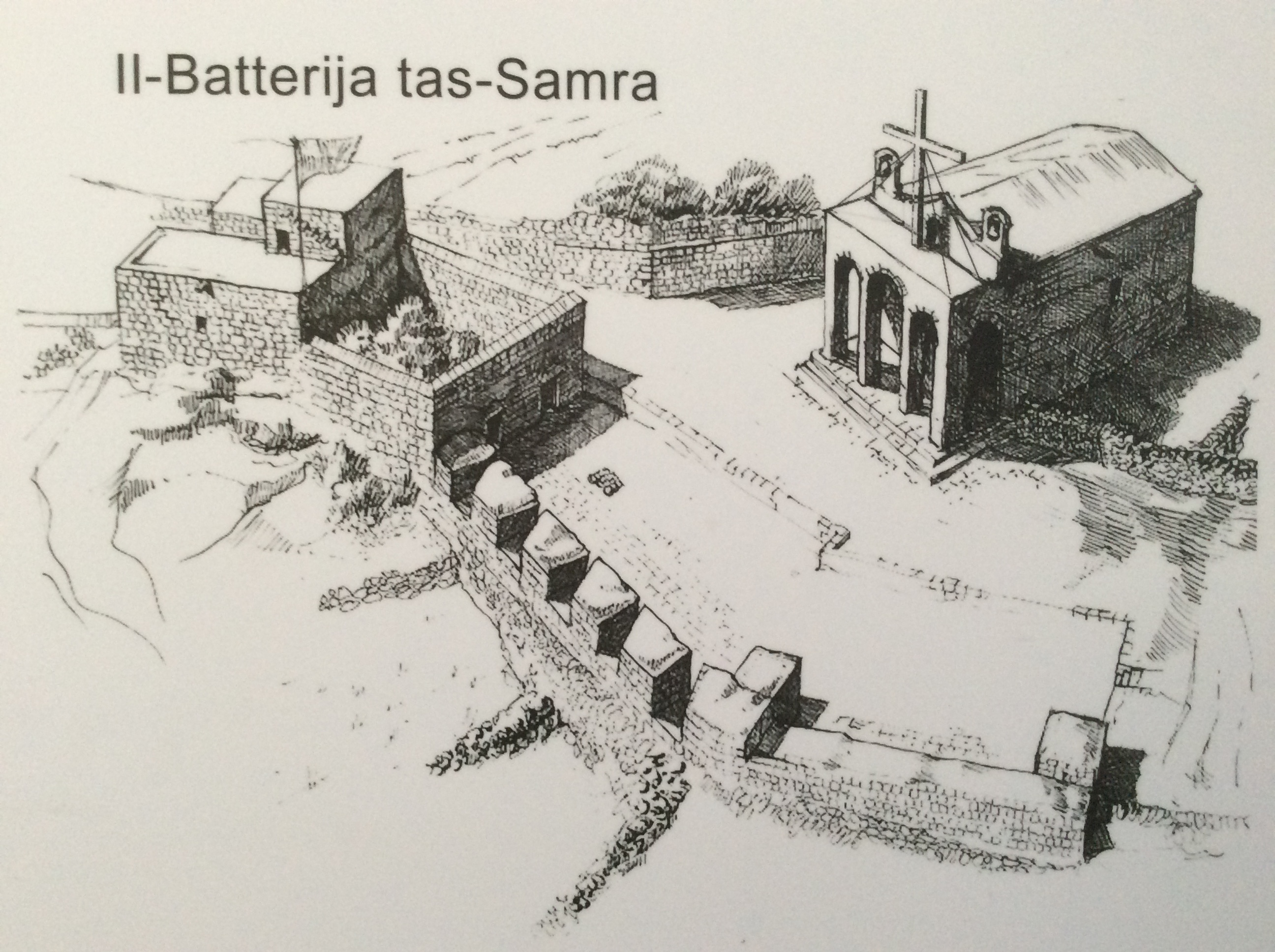
- Reconstruction of Tas-Samra Battery by Stephen C. Spiteri at the Fortifications Interpretation Centre

Site information
- Type: Artillery battery

Location
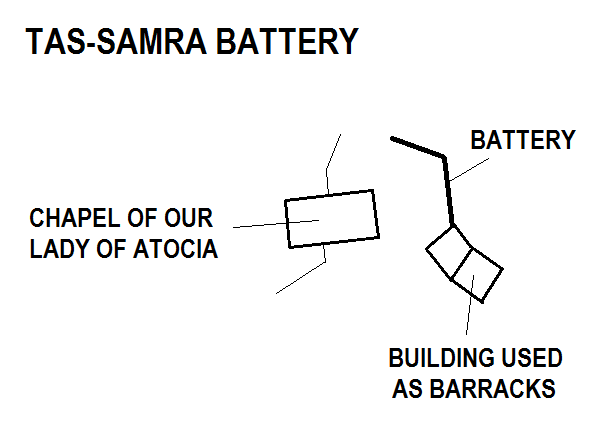
- Map of Tas-Samra Battery
- Coordinates: 35°53′6.5″N 14°29′16.4″E

Site history
- Built: 1798
- Built by: Maltese insurgents
- In use: 1798–1800
- Materials: Limestone
- Fate: Demolished
- Battles/wars: Siege of Malta (1798–1800)

Garrison information
- Past commanders: Francesco Saverio Caruana (overall commander); Angelo Cilia (direct commander)
- Garrison: Żebbuġ Battalion; Siġġiewi Battalion; Naxxar Battalion; Royal Navy sailors HM Marine Forces

Tas-Samra Battery (Maltese: Batterija tas-Samra) was an artillery battery in Ħamrun, Malta, built by Maltese insurgents during the French blockade of 1798–1800. It was part of a chain of batteries, redoubts and entrenchments encircling the French positions in Marsamxett and the Grand Harbour.

== History ==
The battery was built on top of a hill, overlooking the Floriana Lines, Strada San Giuseppe (the main road which led from Valletta to Mdina), Marsa and Corradino. It was very close to the hornwork of the French-controlled Floriana Lines, and as such was one of the most important insurgent batteries.

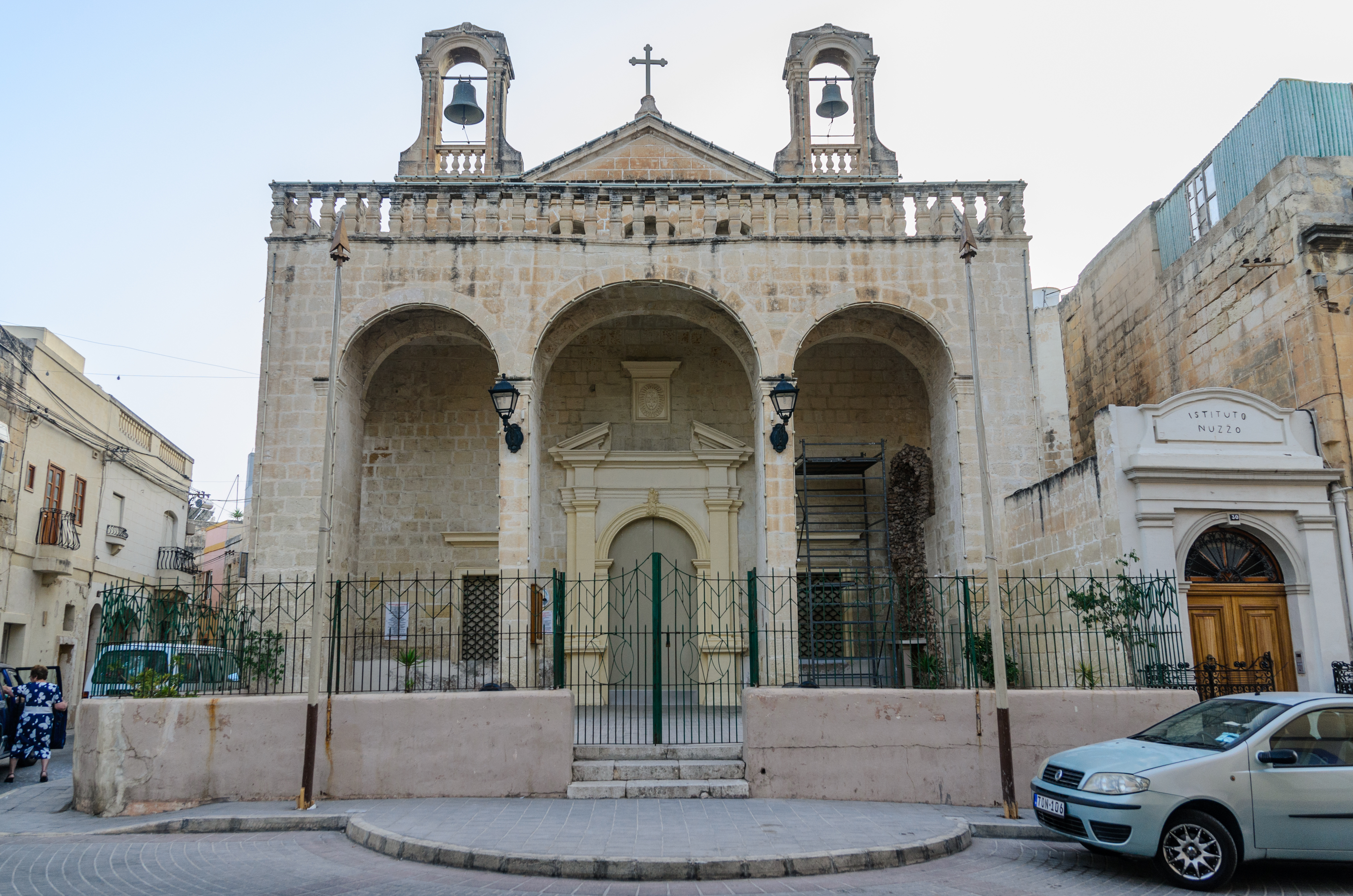
Our Lady of Atocia Chapel

Tas-Samra Battery took its name from the Chapel of Our Lady of Atocia, known as tas-Samra in Maltese, and originally dedicated to St. Nicholas. The chapel, which had been built in 1631 on the site of an earlier church, stood at the rear of the battery. The battery itself had a paved gun platform and a parapet with five embrasures. It had an open rear, but this was shielded by the chapel as well as a number of other buildings and rubble walls. One of these buildings was used as a barracks, and a flagpole was affixed to the side of the building. The battery was also guarded by two small sentry boxes on the east side.

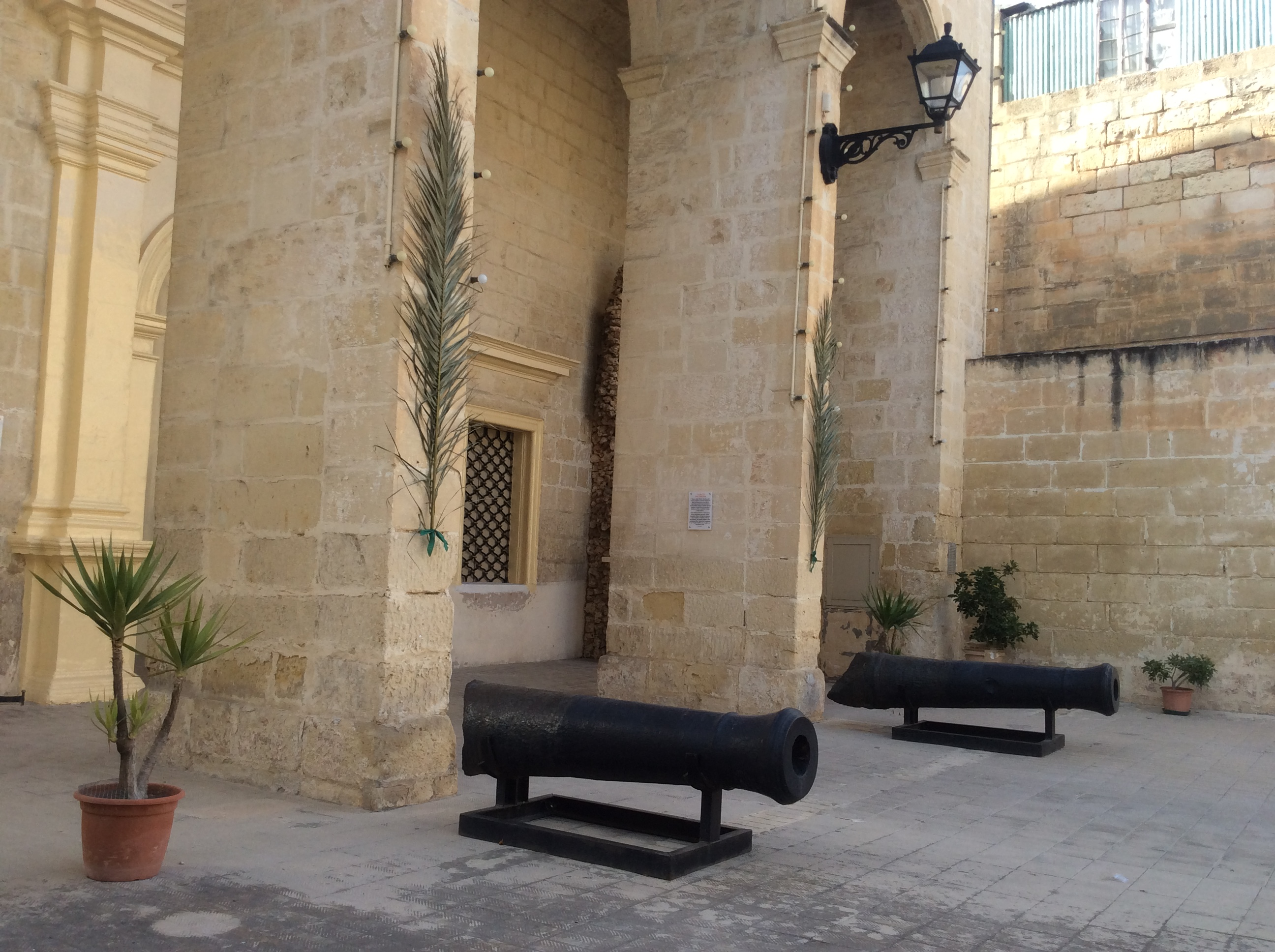
Remains of two cannons used during the rise against the French.

At one point, the battery was armed with two 32-pounders, two 18-pounders, two 12-pounders, two 8-pounders and one 4-pounder, making a total of nine guns. However, contemporary illustrations show it armed with only four guns and two mortars. Two of the guns had been taken from St. Mary's Tower on Comino. Those stationed at Tas-Samra stormed the nearby Villino Blacas and killed the French tenant who was renting it for the last 8 years. During the siege the building was used for living and as a blockhouse.

The battery formed part of Tas-Samra Camp, one of the insurgents' main camps. The camp fell under the overall command of Francesco Saverio Caruana and the direct command of Angelo Cilia and his deputy Isidoro Attard, and it was garrisoned by the Żebbuġ, Siġġiewi and Naxxar Battalions. Later, men from the Royal Navy and HM Marine Forces also assisted the camp. Overall, the garrison was made up of 223 men, and it was eventually increased to up to 600 men. Apart from Tas-Samra Battery, the camp was also responsible for two nearby smaller batteries that were armed with three and four cannons.

Men from Tas-Samra managed to demolish all field walls up to the Floriana Lines, to prevent the French from having any cover in the case of a counterattack. During the siege, the French were desperate to neutralize Tas-Samra Battery, and at one point, they bombarded it constantly for five hours. In an act of defiance, the Maltese insurgents removed a large wooden crucifix from the chapel and erected it on the roof, and they flew a black flag. Three Maltese were killed by French bombardment. In another incident, a cannonball fired from Tas-Samra hit St. James Bastion in Valletta, where it decapitated a French soldier manning one of the guns.

== Present day ==
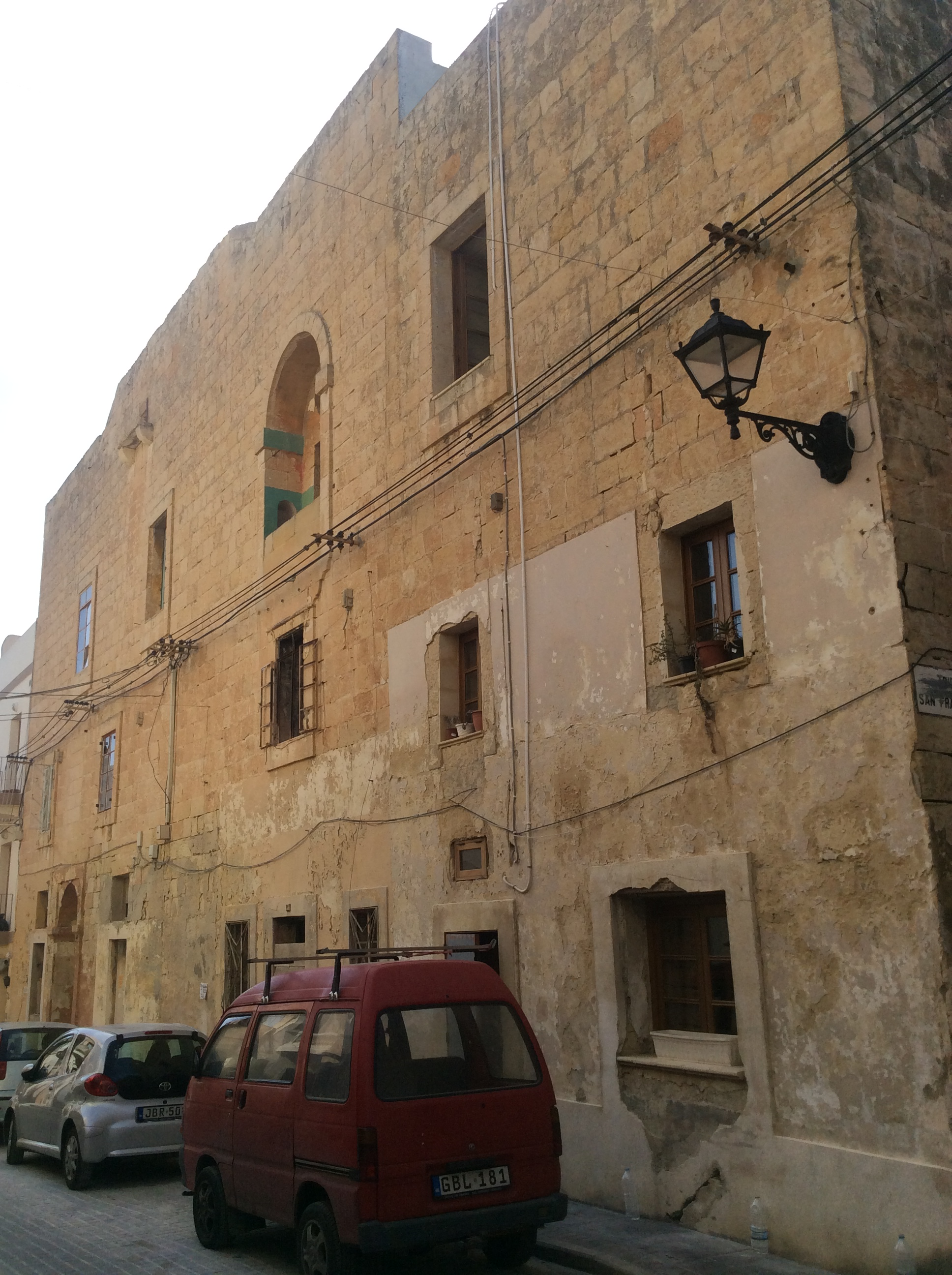
The building used as barracks

Like the other French blockade fortifications, Tas-Samra Battery was dismantled, possibly sometime after 1814. The area formerly occupied by the battery is now heavily built up as a residential area.

Although the battery itself no longer exists, the Chapel of Our Lady of Atocia is still standing, and it is one of the few surviving landmarks of the French blockade in Malta. The 17th-century building built during the rule of the Order of St. John located to the rear of the chapel, that was possibly used as a barracks, has also survived. The building is in a dilapidated state and has suffered from vandalism. It is believed to be the oldest building in the area. The building is a scheduled building but is not being looked after.
