= Bartolomé Rull =

Spanish bishop

His Excellency Bartolomé Rull O.S.Io.Hieros.
- Bishop of Malta
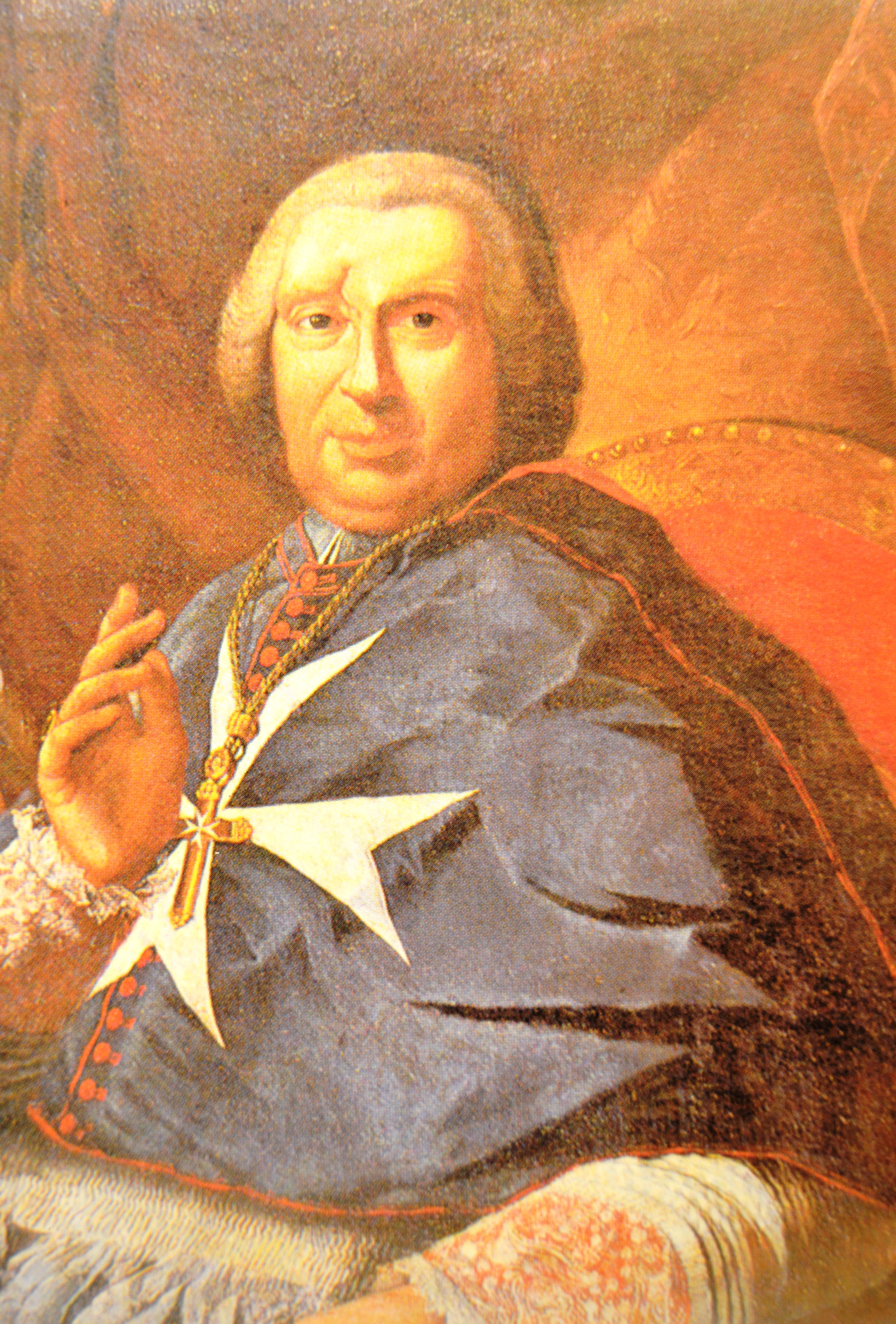
- Church: Roman Catholic
- Diocese: Malta
- Appointed: 22 October 1757
- In office: 1758-1769
- Predecessor: Paul Alpheran de Bussan
- Successor: Giovanni Carmine Pellerano

Orders
- Ordination: 6 March 1718
- Consecration: 7 May 1758 by Domenico Zicari
- Rank: Bishop

Personal details
- Born: 31 July 1691 Pollença, Majorca, Spain
- Died: 19 February 1769 (aged 77) Malta

Bartolomé Rull (31 July 1691 – 19 February 1769) was an 18th-century Spanish prelate who served as Bishop of Malta.

Rull was born on 31 July 1691 in Pollença on the island of Majorca in Spain.

== Career ==
On 6 March 1718, at the age of 26, Rull was ordained priest of the Sovereign Military and Hospitaller Order of St. John of Jerusalem. In October 1757, Rull was selected as the Bishop of Malta and confirmed on December 19 of the same year. He was consecrated to the episcopacy on 7 May 1758 by Domenico Zicari, the Archbishop of Reggio Calabria and co-consecrated by Bishop Francesco Franco of Nicotera and Bishop Stefano Moràbito of Bova. He was then formally installed in St. Paul's Cathedral, Mdina on 27 June 1758. As bishop of Malta, Rull founded many churches and consecrated a great number of them. On 28 April 1762, Rull gave permission for the building of a new church in Tarxien dedicated to his patron St Bartholomew and Our Lady of Good Counsel.

== Death ==
Bishop Rull died on 19 February 1769, at the age of 77, after 10 years as bishop of Malta.
