= Tommaso Bosio =

Italian Roman Catholic prelate (died 1539)

His Excellency Tommaso Bosio O.S.Io.Hieros.
- Bishop of Malta
- Church: Roman Catholic
- Diocese: Malta
- Appointed: 20 March 1538
- In office: 1538-1539
- Predecessor: Balthasar Waltkirk
- Successor: Domenico Cubelles
- Other post: Inquisitor of Malta (1538-1539)

Orders
- Rank: Bishop

Personal details
- Died: 15 August 1539
- Buried: St. Paul's Cathedral, Mdina

Tommaso Bosio (died 15 August 1539) was an Italian Roman Catholic prelate who became the Bishop of Malta in 1538.

== Biography ==
The see of Malta had been vacant for 8 years prior to Bosio's appointment. Bosio was appointed Bishop by of Malta by Pope Paul III on 20 March 1538. Prior to this, he served as the vice-chancellor of the Sovereign Military Order of Malta. Bosio was the first in a successive line of resident bishops in Malta, unlike some of his predecessors who chose not to live in the diocese.

He was also inquisitor of Malta during his episcopacy. He served as bishop for a little over a year. He died on 15 August 1539.
