= Davide Cocco Palmieri =

Italian Roman Catholic prelate

His Excellency Davide Cocco Palmieri O.S.Io.Hieros.
- Bishop of Malta
- Appointed: 15 May 1684
- In office: 1684–1711
- Predecessor: Miguel Jerónimo de Molina
- Successor: Joaquín Canaves

Orders
- Ordination: 24 February 1657
- Consecration: 4 June 1684
- Rank: Bishop

Personal details
- Born: 8 March 1632 Pescocostanzo, Kingdom of Naples
- Died: 19 September 1711 (aged 79) Malta, Hospitaller Malta

Davide Cocco Palmieri was an Italian, Roman Catholic prelate who served as the Bishop of Malta from 1684 until 1711.

== Biography ==
Cocco Palmieri was born in Southern Italy in March 1632. He was ordained a priest of the Sovereign Military Order of Malta on 24 February 1657. Two years after Bishop Molina was transferred to another diocese in Spain, Pope Innocent XI appointed Cocco Palmieri as his successor on 15 May 1684. Cocco Palmieri was greatly esteemed by Grand Master Alof de Wignacourt. He was consecrated bishop on 4 June 1684. During his bishopric, Cocco Palmieri opposed the privileges of the Roman Inquisition. He was also known for his courage to confront the knights when they were mistaken.

Cocco Palmieri established a number of parishes in Gozo such as the parishes of Sannat, Nadur, Xagħra and Żebbuġ. The earthquake of 1693 resulted in the destruction of many buildings, including the cathedral in Mdina. Thus, he started to lay plans for the construction of a new cathedral. He died after 23 years as bishop on 19 September 1711.
