= Joaquín Canaves =

Spanish bishop (1640–1721)

His Excellency Joaquín Canaves O.S.Io.Hieros.
- Bishop of Malta
- Appointed: 30 August 1713
- In office: 1713-1721
- Predecessor: Davide Cocco Palmieri
- Successor: Gaspare Gori-Mancini

Orders
- Ordination: 24 February 1679
- Consecration: 10 September 1713 by Francesco Acquaviva
- Rank: Bishop

Personal details
- Born: 8 January 1640 Pollença, Majorca in Spain
- Died: 3 June 1721 (aged 81)

Joaquín Canaves (8 January 1640 – 3 June 1721) was a Spanish prelate who served as the Bishop of Malta from 1713 till 1721.

== Biography ==
Canaves was born in Pollença, Majorca in Spain. On 24 February 1679 he was ordained priest of the Sovereign Military Order of Malta. On 30 August 1713 Pope Clement XI appointed him as the successor of Bishop Davide Cocco Palmieri of Malta. He was consecrated bishop by Cardinal Francesco Acquaviva on 10 September and formally installed on 4 October the same year. He spent the remaining 7 years as bishop of Malta until 3 June 1721, when he died at the age of 81.

== See also ==
- Catholic Church in Malta
