= Balthasar Waltkirk =

German Roman Catholic prelate (died 1530)

His Excellency Balthasar Waltkirk
- Bishop of Malta
- Church: Roman Catholic
- Diocese: Malta
- Appointed: 1530
- In office: 1530
- Predecessor: Girolamo Ghinucci
- Successor: Tommaso Bosio

Orders
- Consecration: 1530
- Rank: Bishop

Personal details
- Died: 1530

Balthasar Waltkirk (died 1530) was a German Roman Catholic prelate who became the Bishop of Malta in 1530.

== Biography ==
After the resignation of Cardinal Girolamo Ghinucci as Bishop of Malta in 1530, Pope Clement VII appointed Waltkirk as his successor in Malta. Waltkirk was appointed in the same year when the Knights Hospitallers arrived in Malta. Waltkirk died in the same year of his nomination and never managed to come to Malta.
