= Gaspare Gori-Mancini =

Italian prelate (1653-1727)

His Excellency Gaspare Gori-Mancini O.S.Io.Hieros.
- Bishop of Malta
- Church: Roman Catholic
- Diocese: Malta
- Appointed: 1 June 1722
- In office: 1722-1727
- Predecessor: Joaquín Canaves
- Successor: Paul Alpheran de Bussan

Orders
- Ordination: 25 March 1676
- Consecration: 7 June 1722 by Antonfelice Zondadari
- Rank: Bishop

Personal details
- Born: 1 April 1653 Rigomagno, Sinalunga, Italy
- Died: 16 July 1727 (aged 74) Malta
- Buried: St. John's Co-Cathedral

Gaspare Gori-Mancini (April 1653 – 16 July 1727) was an Italian prelate who was appointed as Bishop of Malta in 1722.

== Biography ==
Gori-Mancini was born in the spring of 1653 in Rigomagno in the Province of Siena Italy. In 1676 he was ordained priest of the Sovereign Military Order of Malta. On 1 June 1722 Pope Innocent XIII appointed him as the successor of Bishop Joaquín Canaves as Bishop of Malta. He was consecrated on 7 June 1722 by Cardinal Antonfelice Zondadari. In 1723 Bishop Gori-Mancini, duly authorised by the Holy See, transferred the Seminary of the diocese from Mdina to Valletta. Gori-Mancini was bishop during the reign of Grand Master António Manoel de Vilhena. Bishop Gori-Mancini died after only five years as bishop on 16 July 1727 at the age of 74. He was buried in St. John's Co-Cathedral in Valletta. The tabernacle door and altar front with a medallion depicting the martyrdom of St. Catherine in the Chapel of Italy of the same Church were donated by him but later stolen by Napoleon.
