= Giovanni Carmine Pellerano =

Italian Catholic prelate

His Excellency Giovanni Carmine Pellerano O.S.Io.Hieros.
- Bishop of Malta
- Church: Roman Catholic
- Diocese: Malta
- Appointed: 28 May 1770
- In office: 1770–1780
- Predecessor: Bartolomé Rull
- Successor: Vincenzo Labini
- Other post: Titular Archbishop of Rhodus

Orders
- Ordination: 3 March 1726
- Consecration: 25 August 1770 by Alberto Maria Capobianco
- Rank: Archbishop

Personal details
- Born: 6 February 1702 Mazzarino, Sicily, Italy
- Died: 18 April 1783 (aged 81)

Giovanni Carmine Pellerano (6 February 1702 – 18 April 1783) was an Italian Catholic prelate and a member of the Sovereign Military and Hospitaller Order of St. John of Jerusalem who became bishop of Malta in 1770.

== About ==
Pellerano was born in Mazzarino, Sicily in Italy on 6 February 1702. At the age of 24 he was ordained to the priesthood and became a member of the Sovereign Military and Hospitaller Order of St. John of Jerusalem. In 1770 Pope Clement XIV appointed Pellerano as the Bishop of Malta. He succeeded Bartolomé Rull. His consecration by Archbishop Alberto Maria Capobianco took place on 25 August 1770.

== Exile ==
In 1774 Bishop Pellerano imprisoned some soldiers when he heard that they had beaten one of his marshals. As a consequence some 20 knights forced their way into the prison and liberated them. Out of fear Pellerano took flight to his palace in Mdina. Representatives of the clergy from all parishes gathered in front of the bishop's residence and demanded that he call people together for a large assembly called the chapter general, in order to defend the privileges of the church. Bishop Pellerano was blamed for these disturbances and thus in 1780, on Grand Master Emmanuel de Rohan-Polduc's insistence, he was forced to leave the diocese, never to return. Until a successor could be appointed Monsignor Gejt Grech was appointed to run the diocese.

Upon his forced exile and resignation Pellerano was appointed Titular Archbishop of Rhodus on 19 June 1780. He died three years later, on 18 April 1783.
