= Vincenzo Labini =

Italian archbishop

His Excellency Vincenzo Labini O.S.Io.Hieros.
- Bishop of Malta
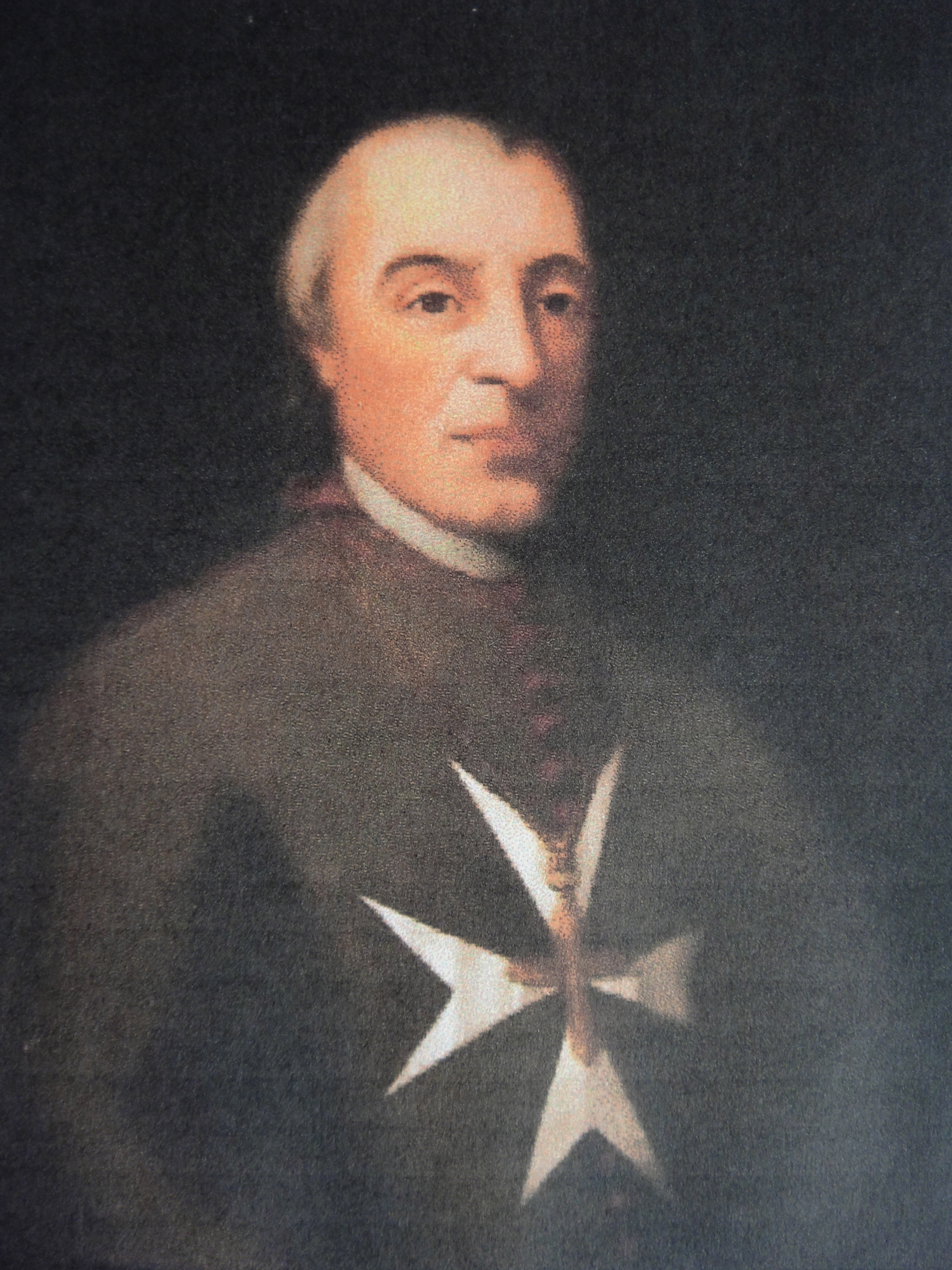
- Church: Roman Catholic
- Diocese: Malta
- Appointed: 19 June 1780
- In office: 1780-1807
- Predecessor: Giovanni Carmine Pellerano
- Successor: Ferdinando Mattei
- Other post: Titular Archbishop of Rhodus

Orders
- Ordination: 23 September 1758
- Consecration: 25 June 1780 by Bernardino Giraud
- Rank: Archbishop

Personal details
- Born: April 28, 1735 Bitonto, Italy
- Died: April 30, 1807 (aged 72) Malta
- Buried: St. Paul's Cathedral, Mdina

Vincenzo Labini (28 April 1735 – 30 April 1807) was an Italian archbishop who served as Bishop of Malta from 1780 till 1807.

== Biography ==
Labini was born in Bitonto, Italy on April 28, 1735. In 1758 he was ordained priest of the Sovereign Military and Hospitaller Order of St. John of Jerusalem better known as the Knights of St John. In 1780 Pope Pius VI appointed Labini as Bishop of Malta upon the resignation of Bishop Giovanni Carmine Pellerano. He was consecrated on June 25, 1780, by Cardinal Bernardino Giraud. It was on March 3, 1797, that the Cathedral Church of Malta was elevated to the Archiepiscopal dignity, since the bishops of Malta became Archbishops of Rhodes and Bishops of Malta thus Labini was the first to be given this title. Vincenzo Labini was an intimate friend of St Alphonsus Maria de' Liguori the Bishop of St Agata dei Goti and founder of the Redemptorists.

Some of the changes that Labini brought in Malta were that the procession of St Gregory was transferred from March 12 to the Wednesday after Easter, he ordered daily Sacramental Benediction in all parish churches and that bells must be rung every Thursday, an hour after sunset, in memory of the institution of the Eucharist. He also consecrated many of the churches in Malta. Labni led the diocese under three different occupants: the Knights, the French and the British. Archbishop Labini died on April 30, 1807, and was buried in the Cathedral at Mdina.
