= List of monasteries and convents in Malta =

This is a list of monasteries and convents in Malta and Gozo:

- De La Salle Brothers (Freres), with their monastery at Cottonera Road, Birgu
- Little Sisters of the Poor (Sorijiet iż-Żgħar tal-Foqra), with their monastery at Little Sisters Street, Ħamrun
- St. Peter's Monastery (Monasteru San Pietru) at Villegaignon Street, Mdina
- St. Catherine's Monastery (Monasteru Santa Katarina) at Republic Street, Valletta
- St. Clare's Monastery (Monasteru Santa Klara) at Mikiel Anton Vassalli Street, San Ġiljan
- St. Marggreth's Monastery (Monasteru Santa Margerita) at Bormla Square, Bormla
- St. Scholastica's Monastery (Monasteru Santa Skolastika) at St. Scholastica Street, Birgu
- St. Orsola's Monastery (Monasteru Santa Ursola) at St. Orsola Street, Valletta
- St. Augustine's Convent (Kunvent Santu Wistin) at Old Bakeries Street, Valletta
- Our Lady of Grotto's Convent (Kunvent tal-Madonna ta' l-Għar) at St. Domenic Square, Rabat
- Cappuchine's Convent (Kunvent tal-Kappuċini) at Frangisk Saver Fenech Street, Floriana
- St. Frances' Convent of Conventional Franciscans Brothers (Kunvent San Franġisk tal-Patrijiet Franġiskani Konventwali) at Republic Street, Valletta
- St. Frances' Convent of Minor Franciscans Brothers (Kunvent San Franġisk tal-Patrijiet Franġiskani Minuri) at St. Paul Street, Valletta
- Patrijiet Ġiżwiti's Convent at Scicluna Street, Naxxar
- St. Liberatas' Convent (Kunvent Santa Liberata) at Cappuchines Street, Kalkara
- Our Lady of Monte Carmel's Convent (Kunvent Madonna tal-Karmnu) at Tower Road, Sliema
- St. John of the Cross' Convent (Kunvent San Ġwann tas-Salib) at Sir Temi Zammit Avenue, Ta' Xbiex
- St. Theresa of Baby Jesus' Convent (Kunvent Santa Tereża tal-Bambin Ġesù) at Valley Road, Birkirkara
- Salesians of Don Bosco - Provincial's Delegate House at 10, St. John Bosco Street, Sliema
- Sacred Heart of Jesus' Seminary (Seminarju tal-Qalb ta' Ġesù) at Enrico Mizzi Street, Rabat, Gozo
- Archbishop's Seminary (Seminarju ta' l-Arċisqof) at Virtus Street, Rabat
- Missionary Society of St. Paul (Soċjetà Missjunarja ta' San Pawl) at St. Agatha Street, Rabat
- Agustinean Sisters' Monastery (Sorijiet Agostijani) at Fleur-de-Lys Road, Birkirkara
- Dorotey Sisters' Monastery (Sorijiet Dorotej) at Alessandro Curmy Street, Rabat
- Dominican Sisters' Monastery (Sorijiet Dumnikani) at Alessandro Curmy Street, Rabat
- Franciscan Sisters Missionars of Mary's Monastery (Sorijiet Franġiskani Missjunarji ta' Marija) at St. Francis Street, Balzan
- Franciscan Sisters of Sacred Heart of Mary's Monastery (Sorijiet Franġiskani tal-Qalb bla Tebgħa ta' Marija) at Canon Bonnici Street, Ħamrun
- Franciscan Sisters of Sacred Heart of Jesus' Monastery (Sorijiet Franġiskani tal-Qalb ta' Ġesù) at Nazju Falzon Street, Msida
- Missionary Carmelities Sisters' Monastery (Sorijiet Karmelitani Missjunarji) at Anton Calleja Street, Kerċem, Gozo
- Missionary Sisters of Charity's Monastery (Sorijiet Missjunarji tal-Karità) at St. Paul Street, Bormla
- Jesus of Nazareth's Monastery (Monasteru Ġesù Nazzarenu) at St. Gregory Street, Żejtun
- Ursuline Sisters - Convent, Creche and Formation House(Sorijiet Orsolini) @ Karm Galea Street, Sliema
- St Joseph of Apparition Sisters' Monastery (Sorijiet ta' San Ġużepp ta' l-Apparizzjoni) at Rue D'Argens, Gżira
- Monasteru Bon Pastur at Dmejda Street, Balzan
- Sisters of Charity, Provincial House (Sorijiet tal-Karità) at Tarxien Road, Tarxien
- Sacred Heart Sisters' Monastery at Sacred Heart Street, San Ġiljan
- Daughters of the Sacred Heart Congregagtion' Church of Immaculate Conception at Nigret, Zurrieq
- Christ the King's Convent at Notabile Road, Birkirkara
- Sorijiet Ulied Marija Għajnuna ta' l-Insara at Republic Street, Rabat, Gozo
