= Joseph Galea-Curmi =

Maltese clergyman (born 1964)

His Excellency Joseph Galea-Curmi
- Auxiliary Bishop of Malta; Titular Bishop of Cebarades
- Church: Catholic Church
- Archdiocese: Malta
- Elected: 23 June 2018

Orders
- Ordination: 5 July 1991 by Mgr Joseph Mercieca
- Consecration: 4 August 2018 by Mgr Charles J Scicluna; Mgr Mario Grech; Mgr Paul Cremona OP
- Rank: Bishop

Personal details
- Born: Joseph Galea-Curmi; January 1, 1964 (age 62) Birkirkara, Malta
- Denomination: Catholic
- Occupation: Bishop
- Motto: vitam alere caritate (We cherish life with love)
- Coat of arms

Styles of Joseph Galea-Curmi
- Reference style: His Excellency
- Spoken style: Your Excellency
- Religious style: Bishop

Joseph Galea-Curmi (born 1 January 1964 in Balzan, Malta) is a Maltese clergyman and Catholic auxiliary bishop in the Metropolitan Archdiocese of Malta.

== Life ==
Monsignor Joseph Galea-Curmi was born of the late Paul and Josette née Mifsud Bonnici, in Birkirkara, on 1 January 1964, and is the third of six children. Mgr Galea-Curmi was educated at Stella Maris School, Ħal Balzan, at the Secondary School of St Paul’s Missionary College, Rabat, and at St Aloysius College (Sixth Form), Birkirkara. He entered the Archbishop’s Seminary in 1982. After completing his studies and a Licentiate in Sacred Theology at the Faculty of Theology, he was ordained to the Roman Catholic priesthood by the Archbishop of Malta, Monsignor Joseph Mercieca, on 5 July 1991. Monsignor Galea-Curmi was sent to further his studies at the Pontifical Lateran University in Rome and obtained a doctorate in Pastoral Theology in 1998. His doctoral thesis was entitled “The Diocesan Synod as a Pastoral Event. A Study of the Post-Conciliar Understanding of the Diocesan Synod”.

After his studies in Rome, Monsignor Galea-Curmi was appointed assistant to the Pastoral Secretary of the Archdiocese of Malta and lecturer in Pastoral Theology at the University of Malta, where he lectures till today. He was also the coordinator of the Archdiocesan Synod held between 1999 and 2003. In 2005 he was appointed board member of the Diocesan Institute for Pastoral Formation, and ecclesiastical assistant of the Centesimus Annus Pro Pontifice Foundation (Malta) since 2008, till today.

In 2015, Archbishop Charles J. Scicluna appointed Monsignor Galea-Curmi Vicar General of the Archdiocese of Malta and Canon of the Cathedral Chapter.

In May 2019 Monsignor Galea-Curmi was admitted as an Ecclesiastical Knight Grand Officer of the Equestrian Order of the Holy Sepulchre of Jerusalem, Lieutenancy of Malta. The investiture ceremony was held at St John's Co-Cathedral and was presided by the Cardinal Grand Master Edwin Frederick O'Brien.

He carries out pastoral ministry at the Parish of the Annunciation in Ħal Balzan.

Catholic Church titles
Preceded by Charles Scicluna	Auxiliary Bishop of Malta; 2018–	Incumbent
