= Paul Alphéran de Bussan =

French Roman Catholic archbishop (1684-1757)

His Excellency Paul Alphéran de Bussan O.S.Io.Hieros.
- Bishop of Malta
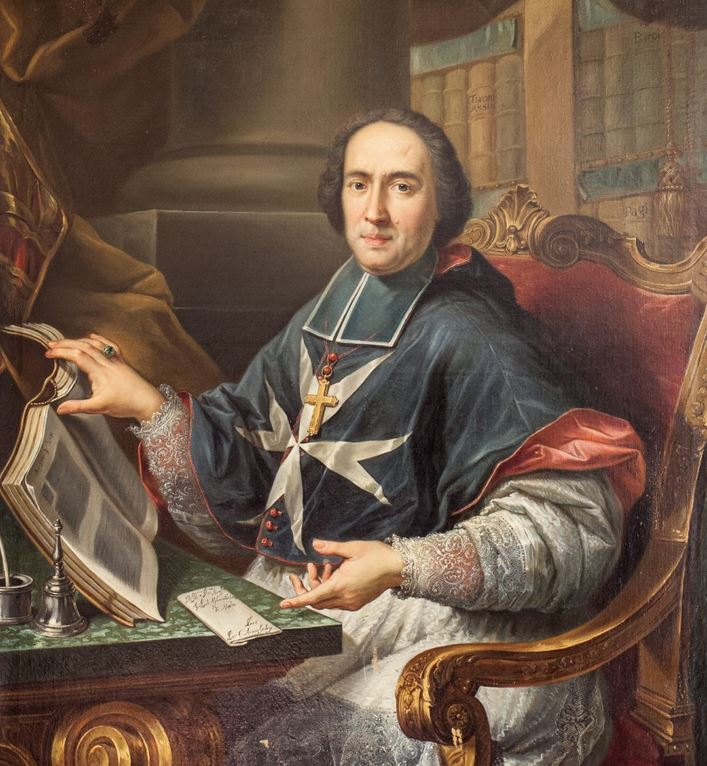
- Church: Roman Catholic
- Diocese: Malta
- Appointed: 8 March 1728
- Installed: 14 March 1728
- Term ended: 20 April 1757
- Predecessor: Gaspare Gori-Mancini
- Successor: Bartolomé Rull
- Other post: Titular Archbishop of Tamiathis

Orders
- Ordination: 8 December 1710 by Davide Cocco Palmieri
- Consecration: 14 March 1728 by Pope Benedict XIII
- Rank: Archbishop

Personal details
- Born: 28 October 1684 Aix-en-Provence, France
- Died: 20 April 1757 (aged 72) Mdina, Malta
- Buried: St. Paul's Cathedral, Mdina

Paul Alphéran de Bussan was a French Roman Catholic archbishop who served as Bishop of Malta from 1728 till 1757.

== Early life ==
Born in Aix-en-Provence, France on 28 October 1686 of noble parentage, Paul Alphéran de Bussan graduated in Bachelor of Theology from the University of Aix in 1705. He soon travelled to Malta and lived with his uncle, Melchior Alpheran de Bussan, a Conventual Chaplain of Obedience of the Sovereign Military Order of Malta. His brother Jean-Melchior Alphéran was also a member of the order of St John and became abbot of Sept-Fons Abbey in 1755. The ship on which the 19-year-old Paul was travelling was caught in heavy storms and had to seek shelter in St. Paul's Bay where he came ashore.

== Priesthood ==
Paul was ordained priest by Bishop Davide Cocco Palmeri on 8 December 1710. He was received as Conventual Chaplain in the Langue of Provence. He was also prior of the convent church of Saint-Jean-de-Malte in Aix-en-Provence in 1720. He was appointed Secretary for French Affairs by Grand Master Antonio Manoel de Vilhena.

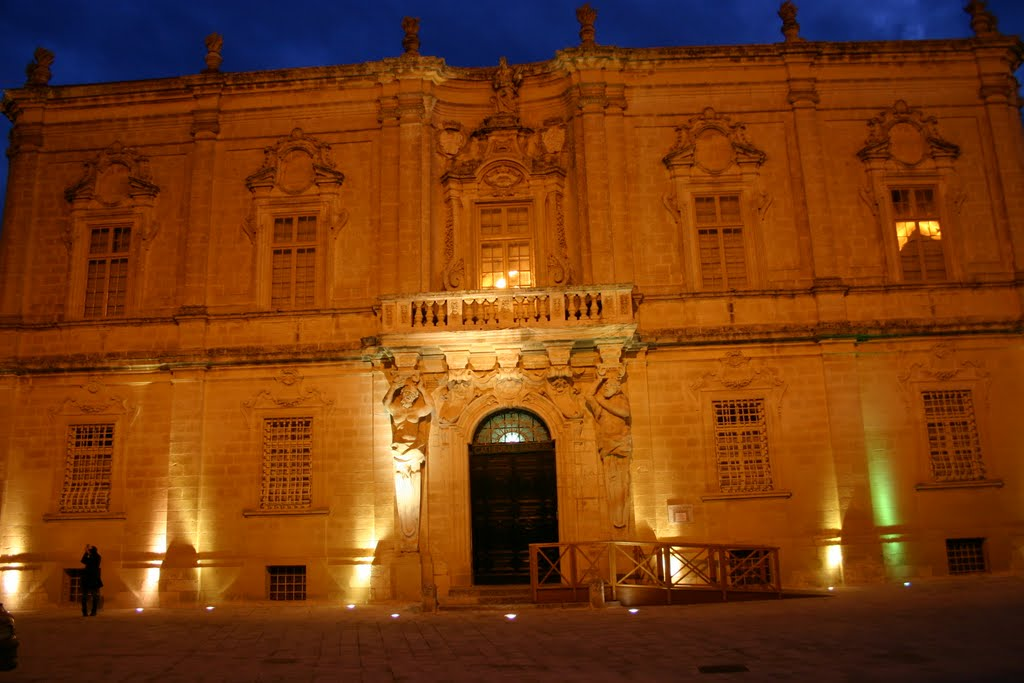
Mdina seminary built by Archbishop Alphéran de Bussan in 1733.

== Bishop ==
On 8 March 1728 Pope Benedict XIII appointed Paul Alphéran de Bussan as Bishop of Malta. He was consecrated by the same Pope on 14 March that year. In 1733 Bishop Alphéran de Bussan built the Mdina seminary, now the Cathedral Museum. On 19 September 1746 he was appointed Titular Archbishop of Tamiathis. In 1752 he financed the printing of a Maltese translation of Cardinal Bellarmino’s Catholic Catechism which was distributed to every parish in Malta.

== Death ==
Archbishop Alphéran de Bussan died on 20 April 1757 at his Mdina residence. He was buried in the Cathedral crypt but his heart was interred in the chapel of the seminary he had built. On the initiative of the Cathedral Chapter, a memorial baroque marble slab was installed in the Chapel of the Blessed Sacrament of the Cathedral.
