= Carmelo Scicluna =

Maltese bishop

The Most Reverend Carmelo Scicluna D.D.
- Bishop of Malta
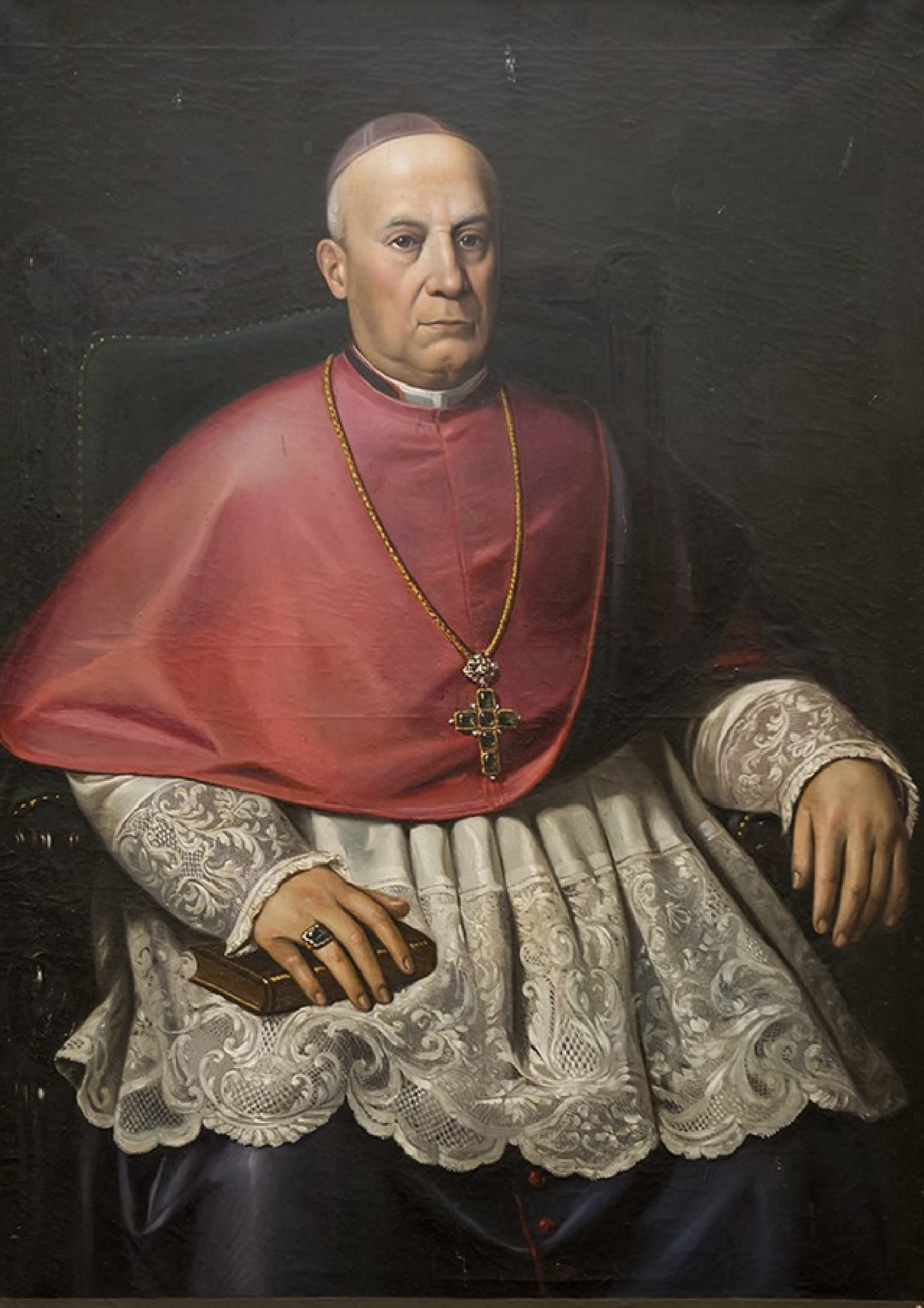
- Church: Roman Catholic
- Diocese: Malta
- Appointed: 15 March 1875
- In office: 1875–1888
- Predecessor: Gaetano Pace Forno
- Successor: Pietro Pace
- Other post: Titular Archbishop of Rhodus

Orders
- Ordination: 18 December 1824
- Consecration: 11 April 1875 by Francesco Converti
- Rank: Archbishop

Personal details
- Born: 3 August 1800 Qormi, Malta
- Died: 12 July 1888 (aged 87)
- Buried: St. Paul's Cathedral, Mdina

Carmelo Scicluna (3 August 1800 – 12 July 1888) was a Maltese prelate and count who served as the Titular Archbishop of Rhodes and Bishop of Malta from 1875 to 1888.

Archbishop Scicluna was born in Qormi on 3 August 1800. He was ordained as a priest in 1824, and 51 years later was consecrated as the Bishop of Malta by His Excellency Francesco Converti of the Archbishop of Reggio Calabria. He was also appointed as the Titular Archbishop of Rhodes. In 1880, Scicluna ordered that the traditional procession of Good Friday should be held on a Friday instead of Maundy Thursday.

Scicluna died on 12 July 1888, at the age of 87, after serving as Bishop of Malta for 13 years. His funeral took place in St John's Co-Cathedral in Valletta and he was buried in St. Paul's Cathedral, Mdina. Large crowds gathered in the city to witness the event.
