= Archdiocese of Malta =

Coordinates: 35°56′14.99″N 14°22′31.5″E

Archdiocese of Malta Archidioecesis Melitensis Archidioecesis Melevitanus Arċidjoċesi ta' Malta

Catholic
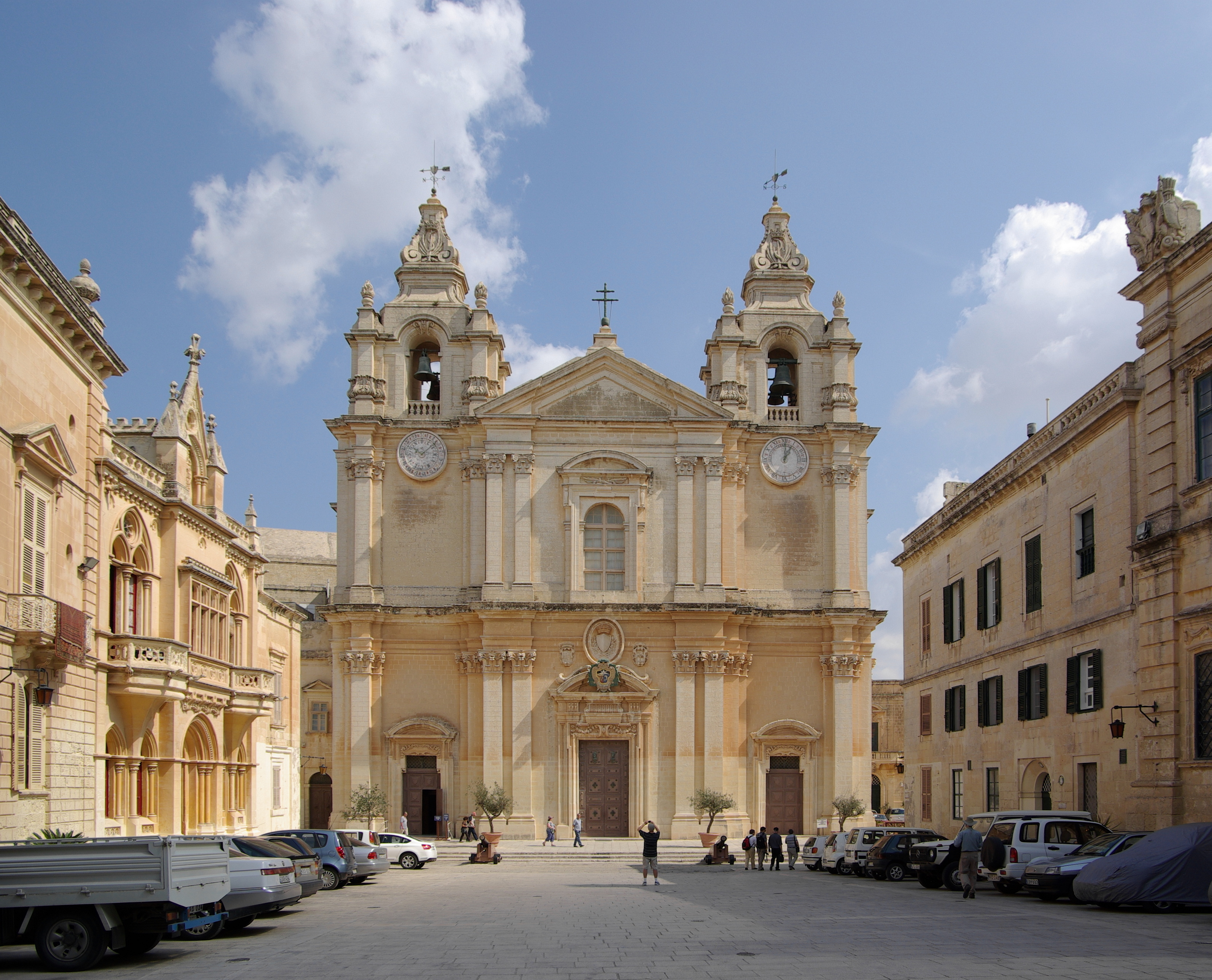
- St. Paul's Cathedral, Mdina

Location
- Country: Malta
- Territory: Island of Malta
- Ecclesiastical province: Malta

Statistics
- Area: 246 km^{2} (95 sq mi)
- Population: Total; Catholics: (as of 2023); 454,600; 382,900 (84.2%)
- Parishes: 70
- Churches: 460

Information
- Denomination: Catholic
- Sui iuris church: Latin Church
- Rite: Roman Rite
- Established: 60 AD (As Diocese of Malta); 1 January 1944 (As Archdiocese of Malta)
- Cathedral: St. Paul's Cathedral, Mdina
- Co-cathedral: St John's Co-Cathedral
- Patron saint: Saint Paul; Saint Publius; Saint Agatha

Current leadership
- Pope: Leo XIV
- Metropolitan Archbishop: Charles J. Scicluna
- Suffragans: Diocese of Gozo
- Auxiliary Bishops: Joseph Galea-Curmi
- Vicar General: Joseph Galea-Curmi

Map
- The Archdiocese of Malta in dark green

Website
- maltadiocese.org

The Archdiocese of Malta (Malti: Arċidjoċesi ta' Malta) is a metropolitan archdiocese of the Latin Church of the Catholic Church in Malta.

== History ==
Tradition claims that St. Paul the Apostle established the diocese of Malta in the year 60 A.D when he ordained the Roman governor, Saint Publius, as the first bishop of Malta and saint.

The Diocese of Malta was made a suffragan diocese to the Metropolitan Archdiocese of Palermo by a Papal Bull of Pope Adrian IV on 10 July 1156 and confirmed by Pope Alexander III on 26 April 1160. The former Diocese of Malta, which is one of the oldest dioceses in the world, was elevated to archdiocese on 1 January 1944. The Diocese of Malta included the islands of Malta, Gozo and Comino. On 22 September 1864, the diocese lost the territories of Gozo and Comino when Pope Pius IX established the Diocese of Gozo which became a suffragan diocese to Malta.

The Catholic Caritas Malta, one of the best-known civil-society organisations in the country, was founded in 1968 at the initiative of Archbishop Mikiel Gonzi and Bishop Nikol Cauchi.

== Cathedrals ==
There are two cathedrals in the diocese: The Metropolitan Cathedral of Saint Paul, in Mdina, and the Co-Cathedral of Saint John the Baptist, located in Valletta.

== Important dates ==
- 22 January (previously 21 January) - Memorial of Saint Publius
- 5 February - Memorial of St. Agatha of Sicily
- 10 February - Solemnity of the Shipwreck of St Paul
- 25 February - Memorial of Maria Adeodata Pisani
- 9 May - Feast of St. George Preca
- 1 July - Memorial of Nazju Falzon
- 8 October - Dedication of the Metropolitan Cathedral

== Flag ==
The flag is a bicolour consisting of yellow on left and white on the right. It is a 2:3 ratio; the same as the Maltese flag.

== Suffragan ==
- Diocese of Gozo

== Bishops of Malta ==
The following were bishops or archbishops of Malta
Name	from	to
Bishops and Titular Archbishops
Bishop Saint Publius	60	90
Bishop Quadratus	91	100
Bishop Danuolus	100	125
Bishop Elladius	125	132
Bishop Gallicanus	132	166
Bishop Orouzio	166	177
Bishop Antidius	177	182
Bishop Giulianus	182	194
Bishop Adalbert	194	200
Bishop Petrus	200	205
Bishop Fiorenzo	205	221
Bishop Zoilo	221	260
Bishop Servetus Villeneuve	260	317
Bishop Filetus	317	339
Bishop Severus	370	379
Bishop Otrejo	379	383
Bishop Letnio	383	400
Bishop Valerius	400	408
Bishop Silvanu	408	?
Bishop Acacius	451	?
Bishop Restituoto	460	?
Bishop Kostantinu	501	?
Bishop Manas	536	?
Bishop Julianus	553	?
Bishop Luċillu	577	599
Bishop Trajanu	599	?
Bishop Giovanni	680	682
Bishop Annetto	700	707
Bishop Adriano	707	?
Bishop Pelladio	722	?
Bishop Vigiliju	740	748
Bishop Giorgius	748	?
Bishop Leone	770	?
Bishop Pawlu	868	?
Bishop Damiano	892	?
Bishop Gualtieri	1089	1095
Bishop Brialdo	1095	1098
Bishop Ġwanni	1098	?
Bishop Rinaldus	1123	?
Bishop Stiefnu	1140	1168
Bishop Johannes I	1168	?
Bishop Ruggerius of Cefalù	1200	?
Bishop Domenicus	1250	1259
Bishop Jacobus of Mileto	1259	?
Bishop Magister Marinus	1267	1268
Bishop Johannes Normandus	1268	1268
Bishop Jacobus of Malta	1272	1297
Bishop Nicolaus	1304	1330
Bishop Alduinus	1330	1334
Bishop Henericus of Cefalù	1334	1341
Bishop Nicolas Bonet	1342	1343
Bishop Ogerius	1343	1346
Bishop Jocobus O.P.	1346	1356
Bishop Hilarius Conradus	1356	1370
Bishop Nicola Papalla	1373	1373
Bishop Antonius de Vulponno	1375	1392
Bishop Niccolo' Papalla	1392	1393
Bishop Maurus Cali	1393	1397
Bishop Andreas de Pace	1397	1408
Bishop Corrado Caracciolo	1408	1408
Bishop Michele de Letras	1408	1410
Bishop Giovanni Ximenes	1410	1412
Bishop Antonius Platamone	1412	1420
Bishop Mauro de Cali	1420	1432
Bishop Senatore Di Noto	1432	1445
Bishop Jocobus Vassallo	1445	1447
Bishop Giacomo Paternò	1447	1447
Bishop Antonio de Alagona	1447	1448
Bishop Riccardo	1448	?
Bishop Francesco Campolo	1460	?
Bishop Antonio de Alagona	1478	1478
Bishop Giovanni Paternò	1479	1489
Cardinal Pierre de Foix, le jeune (Administrator)	1489	1490
Bishop Paolo Della Cavalleria	1491	1495
Bishop Giacomo Valguarneri	1495	1501
Bishop Antonio Corseto	1501	1503
Cardinal Juan de Castro (Administrator)	1506	1506
Cardinal Bandinello Sauli	1506	1509
Bishop Bernardino da Bononia	1509	1512
Bishop Juan Pujades	1512	1512
Archbishop Juan de Sepúlveda	1514	1515
Bishop Bernardino Catagnano	1516	1516
Cardinal Raffaele Riario (Administrator)	1516	1520
Bishop Bonifacio Catagnano	1520	1523
Cardinal Girolamo Ghinucci	1523	1530
Bishop Balthasar Waltkirk	1530	1530
Bishop Tommaso Bosio	1538	1539
Bishop Domenico Cubelles	1541	1566
Bishop Martín Royas de Portalrubio	1572	1577
Bishop Tomás Gargallo	1578	1614
Bishop Baldassare Cagliares	1615	1633
Bishop Miguel Juan Balaguer Camarasa	1635	1663
Archbishop Lucas Buenos	1666	1668
Bishop Lorenzo D'Astiria	1670	1677
Bishop Miguel Jerónimo de Molina	1678	1682
Bishop Davide Cocco Palmieri	1684	1711
Bishop Joaquín Canaves	1713	1721
Bishop Gaspare Gori-Mancini	1722	1727
Archbishop Paul Alphéran de Bussan	1728	1757
Bishop Bartolomé Rull	1757	1769
Archbishop Giovanni Carmine Pellerano	1770	1780
Archbishop Vincenzo Labini	1780	1807
Bishop Ferdinando Mattei	1807	1829
Bishop Francesco Saverio Caruana	1831	1847
Archbishop Publio Maria Sant	1847	1857
Archbishop Gaetano Pace Forno	1857	1874
Archbishop Carmelo Scicluna	1875	1888
Archbishop Pietro Pace	1889	1914
Archbishop Mauro Caruana	1915	1943
Archbishop Mikiel Gonzi	1943	1944
Metropolitan Archbishops
Archbishop Mikiel Gonzi	1944	1976
Archbishop Joseph Mercieca	1976	2006
Archbishop Paul Cremona	2006	2014
Archbishop Charles J. Scicluna	2015	Present

== Auxiliary Bishops of Malta ==
- Annetto Casolani (1848–1866)
- Michael Franciscus Buttigieg (1863–1864)
- Salvatore Gaffiero (1899–1906)
- Paolo Rosario Farrugia (1907)
- Angelo Portelli (1911–1927)
- Emmanuele Galea (1942–1974)
- Emanuele Gerada (1967–1968)
- Joseph Mercieca (1974–1976)
- Annetto Depasquale (1998–2011)
- Charles J. Scicluna (2012–2015)
- Joseph Galea-Curmi (2018–)

== See also ==
- Culture of Malta
- History of Malta
- List of Churches in Malta
- List of monasteries and convents in Malta
- List of retreat houses in Malta
- Religion in Malta
