= Maurus Caruana =

Maltese Archbishop

The Most Reverend Sir Maurus Caruana O.S.B., K.G.C., K.B.E.
- Bishop of Malta
- Church: Roman Catholic
- Province: Palermo
- See: Malta
- Appointed: 22 January 1915
- In office: 1915-1943
- Predecessor: Pietro Pace
- Successor: Mikiel Gonzi
- Other post: Titular Archbishop of Rhodes (1915-1928)

Orders
- Ordination: 14 March 1891 by Hugh MacDonald, C.Ss.R.
- Consecration: 22 January 1915 by Rafael Merry del Val

Personal details
- Born: Luigi Carlo Giovanni Giuseppe Publio Caruana; November 16, 1867 Floriana, Crown Colony of Malta, British Empire
- Died: December 17, 1943 (aged 76) Sliema, Crown Colony of Malta, British Empire
- Buried: St Gregory The Great Parish Church, Sliema, Malta
- Parents: Enrico Caruana & Elizabetta Bonavia

Sir Maurus Caruana, O.S.B., K.G.C., K.B.E. (16 November 1867 – 17 December 1943), was a Maltese Benedictine monk who served as the Bishop of Malta and the Titular Archbishop of Rhodes.

== Early life ==
He was born Luigi Carlo Giovanni Giuseppe Publio Caruana in Floriana, in what was then the Crown Colony of Malta, part of the British Empire. He was the youngest of the three sons of Enrico Caruana, assistant secretary to the Admiral Superintendent of the Malta Dockyards, and Elizabetta Bonavia. His older brothers went on to become a London banker and the Judge-Advocate General of the British Raj in India.

Caruana's mother died on 25 January 1869, when Luigi was still in his infancy, and he was raised by his father. In 1876, at the age of nine, he was admitted to the minor seminary of the Diocese of Gozo, and a year later he pursued his studies at St. Ignatius College in St. Julian's, administered by the Jesuit Fathers. Wishing to become a Benedictine monk, in 1882 he was enrolled in the school operated by the monks of Fort Augustus Abbey in Scotland, where he continued his studies.

== Monk ==
In 1884, Caruana was received as a postulant of the monastic community, and received the monastic habit on March 21 of that year, celebrated by Benedictines as the feast day of St. Benedict, the founder of the Benedictine Order, and being given at that occasion the religious name of Maurus, after one of the founder's most noted disciples. He made his temporary profession of religious vows the following year, and he made his solemn vows three years later, on 11 November 1888. He then pursued his study of theology and was ordained a priest on 14 March 1891 by Hugh MacDonald, C.Ss.R., the Bishop of Aberdeen. He was then sent to pursue his ecclesiastical studies in Rome at San Anselmo College, an international center of studies run by the Benedictine Order.

After his return to his abbey, Caruana taught philosophy, theology and Latin literature at the abbey school. In 1899 he was appointed a parish priest at Dornie, western Ross-shire, in the Scottish Highlands, for which he learned Gaelic to care for a widely scattered flock. In 1904, due to his talents and training, he was chosen to act as private secretary to the Maltese bishop, Ambrose Agius, O.S.B. (1856–1911), another Benedictine monk, who, at the time, was Apostolic Delegate to the Philippines. This was to be his only experience of higher ecclesiastical office before he was appointed bishop.

In 1906, Caruana returned to Fort Augustus Abbey, where he was appointed choir master for the community. He also engaged in a preaching ministry in various locales in Scotland and England over the next few years, including Westminster Cathedral in London, where he preached a course of Lenten sermons. He was especially welcome by the Italian immigrant community of the United Kingdom for his proficiency in their language.

== Bishop ==
In December 1914, Caruana was sent to Brazil on a preaching mission. He decided to spend time with his family back in Malta on the way. While there, he was summoned to Rome the following month where he learned that Pope Benedict XV had named him the Bishop of Malta. He was consecrated at the Basilica of Santa Maria in Trastevere by the Secretary of State of the Holy See, Cardinal Rafael Merry del Val on 10 February that year. The day was of significance, as it is celebrated in Malta as the Feast of St. Paul's shipwreck there and by Benedictines as the Feast of St. Scholastica, the sister of St. Benedict. He was also honored with being appointed a Knight Grand Cross of the Sovereign Military Order of Malta.

The population of Malta received its new bishop with huge enthusiasm and he received a large donation from the public to commemorate the occasion, which he promptly turned to purchasing bread for the poor and for the upkeep of the seminary of the diocese. He became the first Maltese to be created a Knight Commander of the Order of the British Empire in 1918, shortly after the Order had been established by King George V.

On 29 March 1928 Monsignor Caruana was granted the personal title of archbishop by Pope Pius XI, as the Titular See of Rhodes, which the Bishops of Malta had held concurrently since 1797, had been restored as a functioning diocese.

Archbishop Caruana, broadcasting to the Maltese on December 26, [1942] exhorted them to make an all-out effort for victory [against the Axis powers]. "There is no other alternative", he said, "for all right-thinking men faced with the evidence of the inherent barbarity of the enemy, his anti-Christian temper, his persecution of religion, his contempt for the laws of civilization and his savage extermination of the Jews." He thanked the men of the merchant and Royal navies, and the R.A.F., for their courage and devotion.

— "Pope Grants Plenary Indulgence in Air Raids", The Advocate (7 January 1943)

== Death ==
Caruana died during World War II, after he had led the island through the Siege of Malta by the Nazi Luftwaffe, and Italian Air Force. He is buried in St Gregory, The Great Parish Church in Sliema, Malta.
