= Publio Maria Sant =

Maltese prelate

His Excellency Publio Maria Sant
- Bishop of Malta
- Church: Roman Catholic
- Diocese: Malta
- Appointed: 12 April 1847
- In office: 1848-1864
- Predecessor: Francesco Saverio Caruana
- Successor: Gaetano Pace Forno
- Other post: Titular Archbishop of Rhodus

Orders
- Ordination: 21 December 1805
- Consecration: 28 June 1818 by Ferdinando Mattei
- Rank: Archbishop

Personal details
- Born: September 1, 1779 Valletta Malta
- Died: October 28, 1864 (aged 85)
- Parents: Count Giovanni Francesco Sant and Baroness Chiara Bonici-Platamone-Xara-Cassia

Publio Maria Sant (26 August 1779 – 28 October 1864) was a Maltese prelate who became bishop of Malta in 1847.

== Biography ==
Sant was born into a noble family in Valletta on August 26, 1779. His father, Giovanni Francesco, was the 2nd Count Sant while his mother, Chiara Bonici-Platamone-Xara-Cassia, was the 7th Baroness of Ghariexem and Tabia in her own right. His grandfather, Baldassare Salvatore Sant, was created count by Maria Theresa, the Empress of Austria and Queen of Hungary and Bohemia, in her Italian territories. In 1805 Sant was ordained priest at the age of 26. In 1817 he was appointed as the Titular Bishop of Laranda and ordained bishop on June 28, 1818 by Ferdinando Mattei the Bishop of Malta. On April 12, 1847 he was appointed as the Coadjutor Bishop of Malta while a few months later, on 17 November, he succeeded as Bishop of Malta, and Titular Archbishop of Rhodes, after the death of Bishop Francis Saverio Caruana. He was formally installed on June 15, 1848. Archbishop Sant is well known in Sliema as the one who gave permission for the construction of a new church dedicated to Our Lady of Stella Maris in 1852. Archbishop Sant resigned on December 4, 1857. He died seven years later on October 28, 1864. His brother, Count Luigi Maria Sant-Cassia, was married to the niece of Cardinal Fabrizio Sceberras-Testaferrata.
