= Mikiel Gonzi =

Maltese Catholic bishop (1885–1984)

The Most Reverend Sir Michael Count Gonzi KBE
- Archbishop of Malta
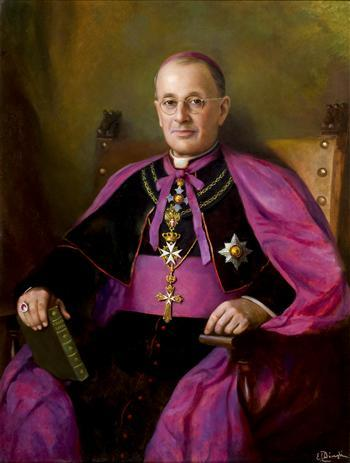
- Portrait by Edward Caruana Dingli, 1943
- Church: Roman Catholic Church
- Archdiocese: Archdiocese of Malta
- See: Malta
- Appointed: 14 October 1943
- In office: 1943 — 1976
- Predecessor: Mauro Caruana
- Successor: Joseph Mercieca
- Previous posts: Bishop of Gozo; Coadjutor Bishop of Malta; Bishop of Malta; Titular Bishop of Lyrbe

Orders
- Ordination: 19 December 1908
- Consecration: 20 July 1924 by Maurus Caruana

Personal details
- Born: 13 May 1885 Vittoriosa, Birgu, Colony of Malta
- Died: 22 January 1984 (aged 98) Malta

Sir Michael Count Gonzi KBE (born Mikiel / Michele Gonzi: 13 May 1885 – 22 January 1984) was Roman Catholic Archbishop of Malta from 1944 until 1976. He had been enthroned as Bishop of Malta in December 1943, and was consecrated as the first Archbishop of Malta in 1944. He had also been Bishop of Gozo and an elected Labour Senator in the Malta Legislative Assembly.

Archbishop Count Gonzi is known for his intervention in politics, having also interdicted the Labour Party and demanding people not to vote for them. Despite this, 43.7% of the population, in 1966, voted for the Dominic Mintoff-led Labour Party and this was interpreted as a decline in the Church's influence and declining religious, social and political power. His support for public harassment, mainly politicians, led to an outline of 'Six Points' of church and state separation, where eventually the church was confined to spiritual matters.

Gonzi was a staunch opponent of homosexuality, on his belief that it was a grave sin, "unnatural" and practiced by the "sick". Similarly, he was against equal rights between men and women, and demanded punishment for adulterers. He was in support of the 're-introduction' of the Italian language, instead of promoting Maltese, but his waited opportunism was never realised. He was a social smoker who generally smoked cigars.

== Early life and ordination ==
He was born as Michele Gonzi in Vittoriosa on 13 May 1885. He was the son of Giuseppe Gonzi (1840 - 1935) and Margherita Tonna. He had one younger brother, Lorenzo Gonzi (1888 - 1934), and four elder half-siblings from his father's first marriage to Maria Xerri. Gonzi's younger brother, Lorenzo, was the paternal grandfather of Lawrence Gonzi, 12th Prime Minister of Malta from 2004 - 2013. Gonzi was ordained to the priesthood in 1908.

== Political and ecclesiastical career ==
Elected as a Labour Senator in the Malta Legislative Assembly in 1921, he resigned half-way into his term to be enthroned as the 5th Bishop of Gozo in 1924. Gonzi held this office until 14 October 1943, when he became coadjutor bishop of Malta and Titular Bishop of Lyrbe. Three months later, Sir Mauro Monsignor Caruana, Bishop of Malta, died, and, on 17 December, Gonzi succeeded him as Bishop. Gonzi became Archbishop of Malta in 1944 when Malta was elevated to an archdiocese.

Gonzi was instrumental in helping families without decent dwellings to find good houses. He commissioned the construction of apartments for families and was also the motor behind the construction of many churches especially the one in Kalkara.

Gonzi resigned his post as Archbishop of Malta in 1976 when he was succeeded by Joseph Mercieca.

== Church-State relations ==
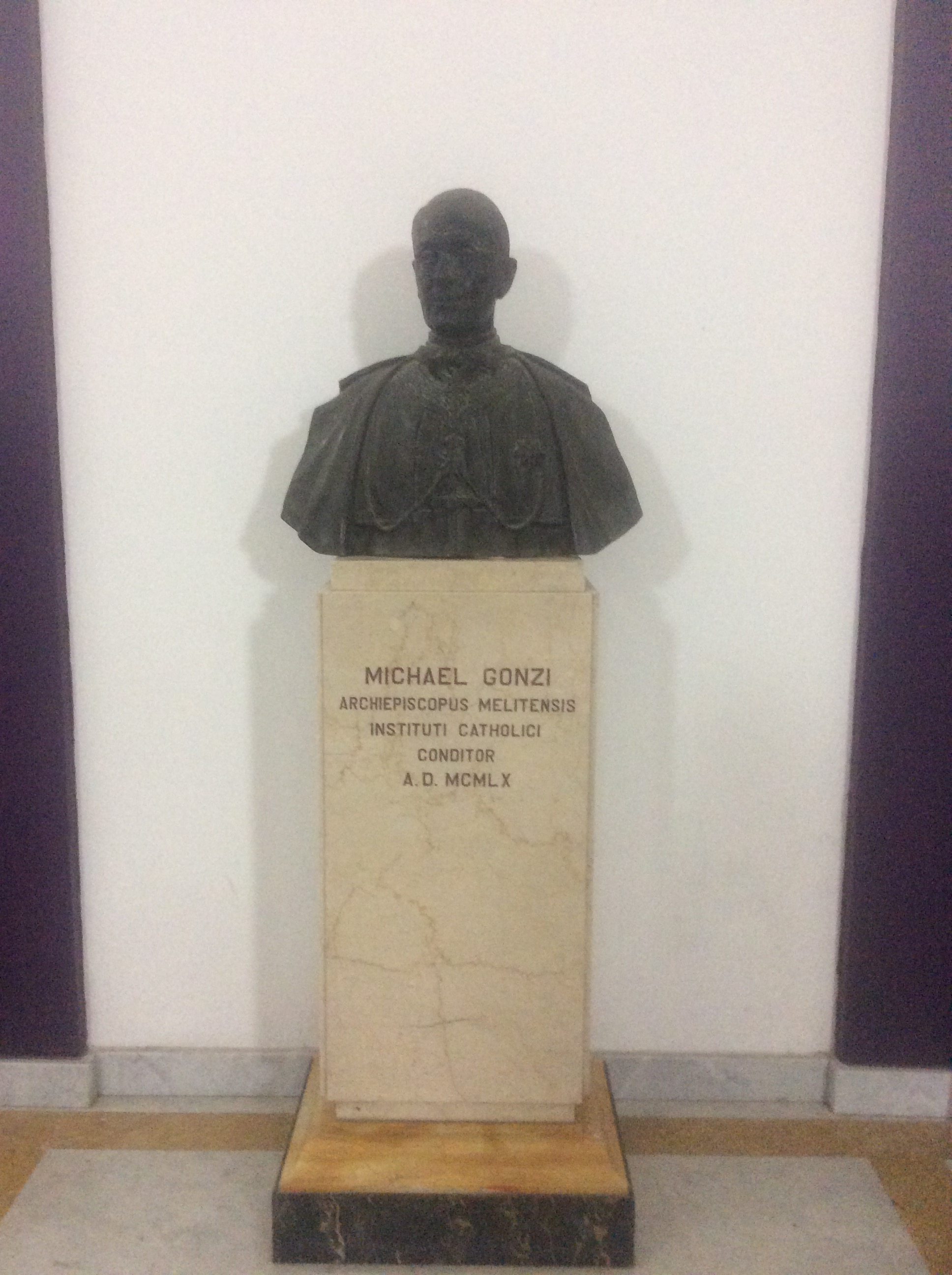
Archbishop Gonzi monument at the Catholic Institute in Floriana

Though Gonzi's tenure as Archbishop of Malta was a controversial one due to strained relations with the Labour Party, particularly with its fiery and confrontational leader Dom Mintoff, Gonzi was a popular figure with tens of thousands of loyal followers, including young people affiliated with religious groups such as Żgħażagħ Ħaddiema Nsara, MUSEUM and Azzjoni Kattolika.

Trouble started in 1948 when Mintoff was still Deputy Leader of his Party. At a dinner in which Mintoff presided, guests sang The Red Flag and anti-clerical speeches were made. Gonzi feared that communism could spread in Malta, leading to a religious and spiritual decline among the Maltese as well as the loss of civil liberties.

Relations started deteriorating again during the Integration campaign of the mid-1950s. Gonzi feared that the privileged position of the Catholic Church would be lost to the Anglican Church once Malta became part of the United Kingdom and asked for guarantees which were never forthcoming. The church and its supporters were categorically against the plan for integration and asked voters to vote 'no' or abstain in the referendum of 14 February 1956, floating banners such as Meta tivvota Alla jarak u jiġġudikak (When you're voting God will watch you and will judge you).

The Church, and in particular Gonzi's, relationship with the Labour Party, worsened further in 1958 when nationwide protests and street unrest developed when it was announced that the dockyard would be gradually shutting down and the number of workers drastically reduced. Gonzi condemned the violent protests and accused the Labour Party of supporting them. The Labour Party in turn accused the church for condemning the protesting workers while never condemning the harsh repressions by the British colonial authorities.

The antagonistic talk was further exacerbated with Labour's decision to develop relationships with Afro-Asian Peoples' Solidarity Organization (AAPSO), believed to be a socialist front organisation. On St. Patrick's Day, 17 March 1961, Gonzi 'interdicted' supporters of the Labour Party, specifically, the Party's Executive Committee, readers, distributors and advertisers in the Party papers and voters and candidates of the Party. The key issue became whether the state should be secularised in line with modern parameters, or whether the Church should retain its privileged position.

Those 'interdicted' could not receive the sacraments and, when they died, were buried in unconsecrated ground, in a part of the cemetery popularly called by the pejorative term Il-Miżbla. This included Labour deputy leader and prominent novelist Ġużè Ellul Mercer.

During 'interdiction', the political climate in Malta was very tense with the church organising rallies for preparation of the spirit in view of the forthcoming elections. The Labour Party rallies were also often disrupted by continuous churchbell ringing and whistling and other deliberate noise by Catholic laymen. Sermons during Mass were predominantly characterised by political issues and so were pastoral letters read in church.

Interdiction would only be lifted in 1964 and peace with the Labour Party only made in 1969.

== Distinctions ==
Archbishop Gonzi was appointed a Knight Commander of the Order of the British Empire (K.B.E.), entitling him to be known as Sir Michael Gonzi, in the 1946 New Year Honours. Gonzi was knighted for his services during the Second World War when, as Bishop of Gozo during a critical phase of the war when supplies were running low, he encouraged Gozitan farmers to put their hoarded grain on the market to bring down the price of bread.

In 1949, on the occasion of the silver jubilee of his consecration as Bishop, Pope Pius XII made him an Assistant at the Pontifical Throne and created him a Papal Count for his works on behalf of the Papacy. In the same year he was awarded an honorary LL.D. degree by the University of Malta, and was appointed Bailiff Grand Cross of the Sovereign Military Order of Malta.

In 1963, Generalísimo Francisco Franco made Count Gonzi a member of the Order of the Cross of St Raimond de Peñafort. He was also appointed Commander of the Order of the Holy Sepulchre in 1965.

== Death ==
Archbishop Gonzi died on 22 January 1984, aged 98.

== Sources ==
- Borġ, J. (1984), Imkasbrin fil-miżbla, Dip. tal-Partit tal-Ħaddiema.
- Fenech, D. (1976), The making of archbishop Gonzi, Union Press.
- Galea, M. & Tonna, E. (1984), L-arċisqof Gonzi, Valletta: Associated News.
