= Pietro Pace =

Maltese prelate

The Most Reverend Sir Pietro Pace
- Bishop of Malta
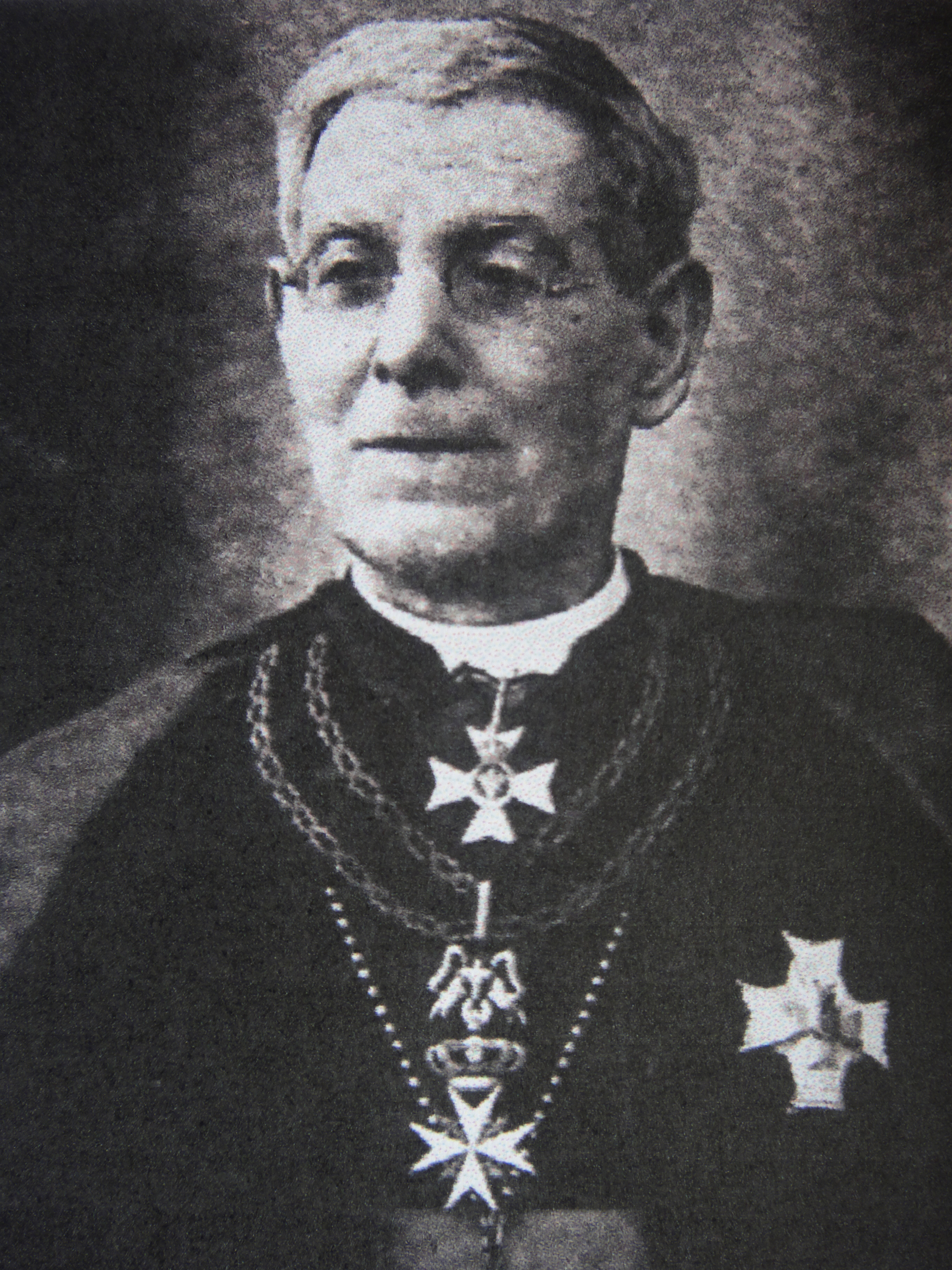
- Church: Roman Catholic
- Diocese: Malta
- Appointed: 11 February 1889
- In office: 1889-1914
- Predecessor: Carmelo Scicluna
- Successor: Mauro Caruana
- Other post: Titular Archbishop of Rhodes
- Previous post: Bishop of Gozo (1877-1889)

Orders
- Ordination: 17 December 1853
- Consecration: 8 April 1877 by Edward Henry Howard

Personal details
- Born: 9 April 1831 Victoria, Gozo Colony of Malta
- Died: 29 July 1914 (aged 83) Victoria, Gozo Colony of Malta
- Denomination: Roman Catholic

Sir Pietro Pace (9 April 1831 – 29 July 1914) was a senior-ranking Maltese prelate who served as the Titular Archbishop of Rhodes and Bishop of Malta from 1889 until his death in 1914.

== Biography ==
Archbishop Pace was born in Rabat (later renamed Victoria) on Gozo on 9 April 1831 and was baptised on the same day in St George's Basilica. He was ordained a priest in 1853 and was consecrated as the third Bishop of Gozo in the Basilica of Sant'Ambrogio e Carlo al Corso in Rome by the English prelate, Edward Henry Cardinal Howard, on 8 April 1877. He served as Gozo's bishop until 1889 when he was transferred to the Bishopric of Malta succeeding Archbishop Carmelo Scicluna. He was also appointed as the Titular Archbishop of Rhodes. He ministered in Malta for 25 years until he died in Victoria, Gozo, 29 July 1914.

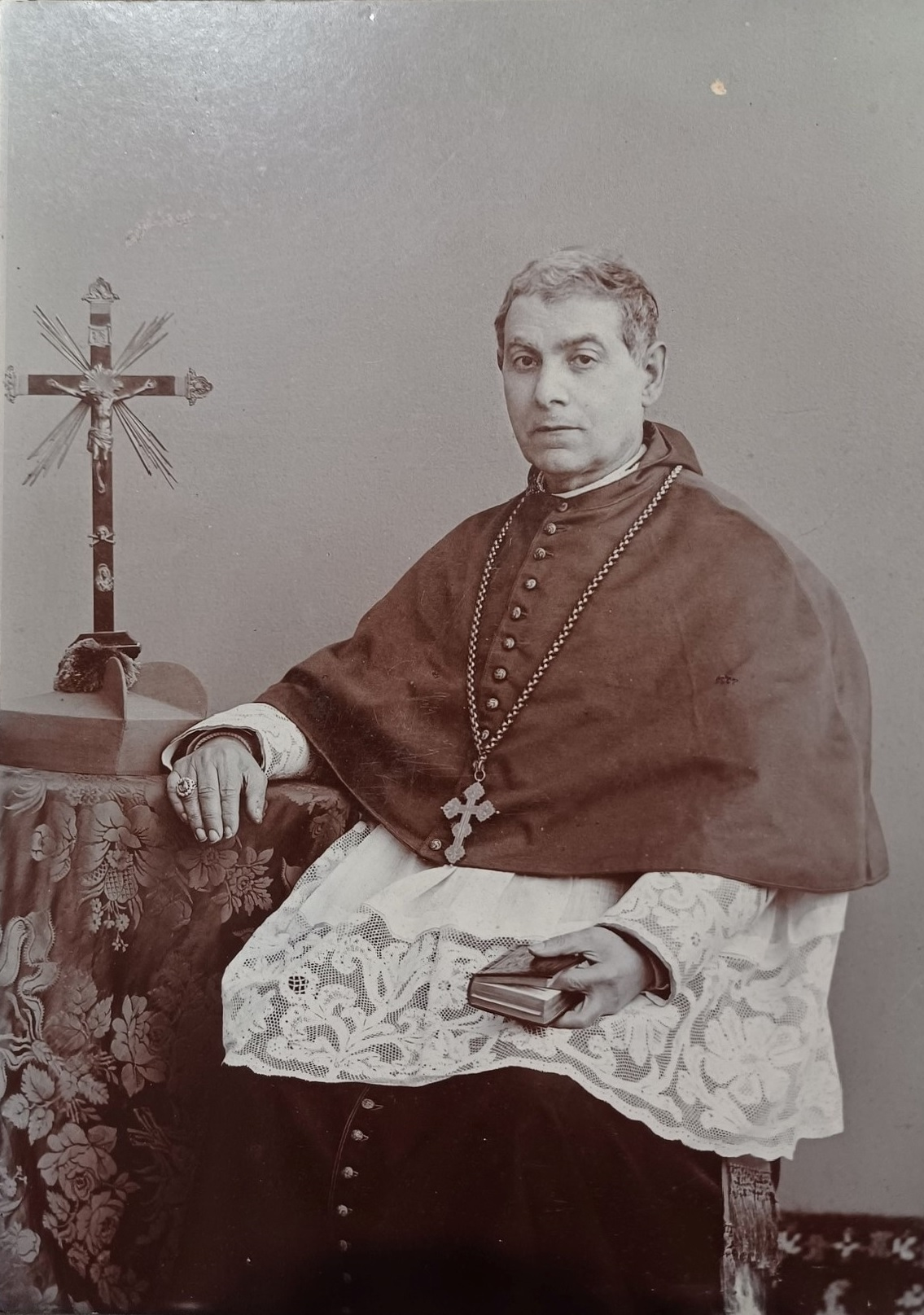

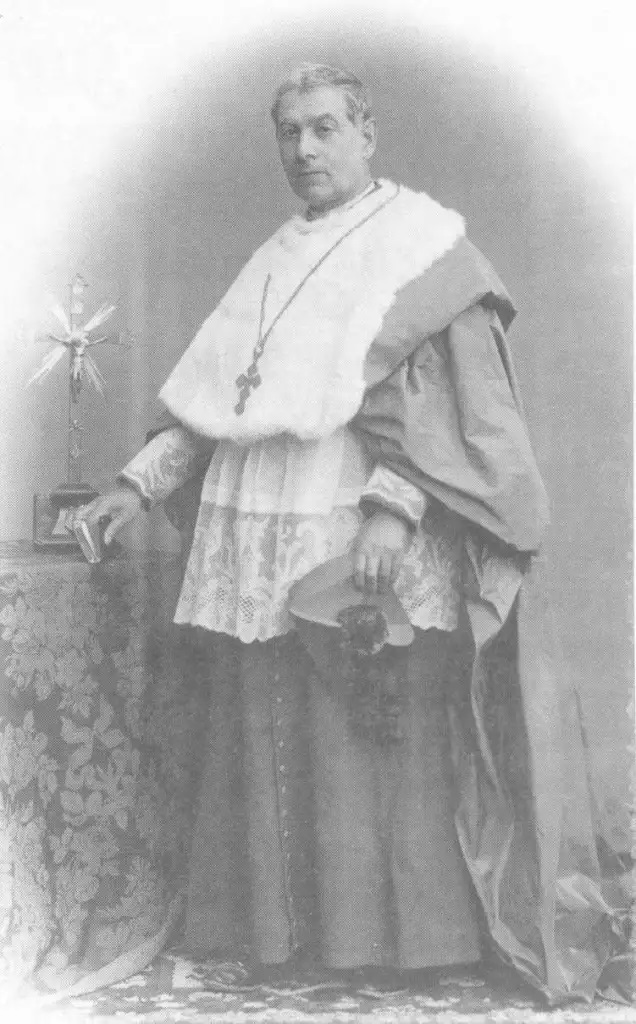

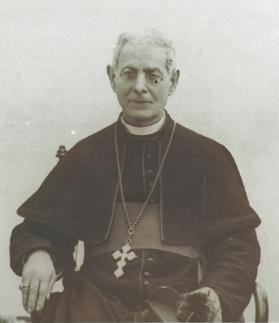

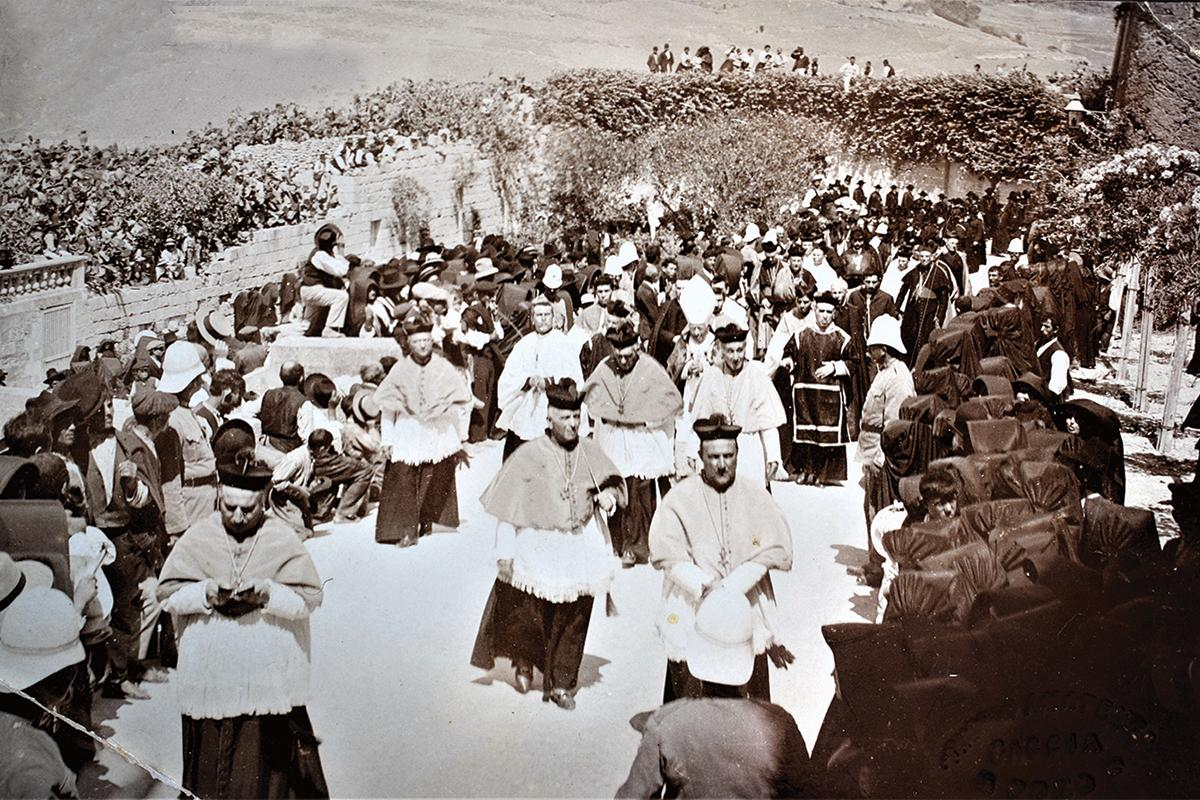
Funeral of Bishop Pietro Pace

Catholic Church titles
Preceded by Antonius Grech Delicata Testaferrata	Bishop of Gozo; 1877–1889	Succeeded by Giovanni Maria Camilleri
Preceded by Carmelo Scicluna	Archbishop of Malta; 1889–1914	Succeeded by Mauro Caruana
