= Mannarino =

Mannarino is an Italian surname. Notable people with the surname include:

- Adrian Mannarino (born 1988), French tennis player
- Alessandro Mannarino (born 1979), Italian singer-songwriter, known mononymously as Mannarino
- Gaetano Mannarino (1733–1814), Maltese priest and rebel
- Hélène Mannarino (born 1990), French journalist and presenter
- Tommaso Mannarino (17th century), Italian monk and scholar
