= Santa Maria a Mare =

Santa Maria a Mare may refer to:

- Abbey of Santa Maria a Mare, Italy
- Church of Our Lady of Sorrows, Pietà, Malta
