= Maltese Università =

Late mediaeval body of Malta under the Kingdom of Sicily

Local administrative late mediaeval body of Malta under the Kingdom of Sicily. The Università was recognised by the Crown of Aragon, following the general insurrection in the Maltese Islands in the autumn of 1282, part of the Sicilian Vespers (see also Battle of Malta (1283))

== Background ==
Following the Battle of Malta of 1283, Malta passed to the Crown of Aragon; however, the protracted War of the Vespers only ended in 1302 with the Peace Treaties of Caltabellotta and of Villeneuve.

Martin I of Sicily appointed Guglielmo Raimondo III Moncada as Marquis of Malta in 1392 and again in 1396. A rebellion by Moncada was defeated by royal forces, leading to a long period of municipal administration by the Università in the royal demanio, except for a brief interlude in the 1420s when the Maltese islands were controlled by Gonsalvo de Monroy. The Università had various functions, including the acquisition of wheat, particularly from Licata every April, defence of the islands, maintenance of fortifications and the issuing of licences to hawkers and tradesmen.

In 1530, the Maltese Islands were given as a fief by Emperor Charles V to the Knights of St John (later called the Knights of Malta), ending the demanial rule.

== Period under the Knights of St John ==
Grand Master Philippe Villiers de L’Isle Adam established the Order's first headquarters in Birgu, which quickly became the centre of military and administrative activity. Within this setting, the need for secure food storage was a pressing concern, particularly the safekeeping of imported grain, Malta's staple supply. In an exploratory mission in 1524, the Knights of St. John noted how the islands were dependent on grain imports since agriculture was dedicated to the production of cotton, honey and cumin.

In 1536, Grand Master Juan de Homedes reorganised the Università or Council of Jurors, dividing it into two municipalities: Mdina and Birgu. The Birgu Università, was based in Triq il-Kunsill Popolari in Birgu and was responsible for the provision of grain for the population of the area. It immediately undertook the excavation of six interconnected rock-hewn granaries at 27, Triq il-Mina Kbira in Birgu, adjacent to the Church of St George, subsequently demolished in the 17th century. One granary remains visible, covered by a granite block incorporated into the pavement, while the others are concealed beneath the street. Undoubtedly, these silos were beneficial during the Great Siege of 1565.

Subsequently, after the Great Siege of 1565, the Knights and the Università relocated to Valletta. Directly overseen by the Knights, it ensured that the populace was well nourished to prevent political unrest, and in the event of insurrection, this could be swiftly quelled, as they managed all grain reserves. Under the Knights, the primary function of the Università was the administration of food supply, particularly grain, as well as the excavation of numerous rock-hewn subterranean granaries, known locally as "Il-Fosos". In 1686, Grand Master Gregorio Caraffa built Dar Annona in Castille Place, Valletta as an administrative centre to house the Università dei Grani and oversee the granaries located at St Elmo, Castille Place, and several other sites throughout Malta. (See main article Il-Fosos)

Archival records indicate that a grain fund was formally established by 1635 known as Massa Frumentaria to provide a stable and affordable supply of grain. The Università received private capital from wealthy citizens, which was invested at a fixed interest rate. The fund was managed by a designated official referred to as the Depositario, who supervised the financial operations and grain procurement. (See main article on Massa Frumentaria)

In 1818, after Malta became a Crown Colony, Governor Sir Thomas Maitland dissolved the Università.
