= Rising of the Priests =

1775 Maltese uprising against the Knights Hospitaller

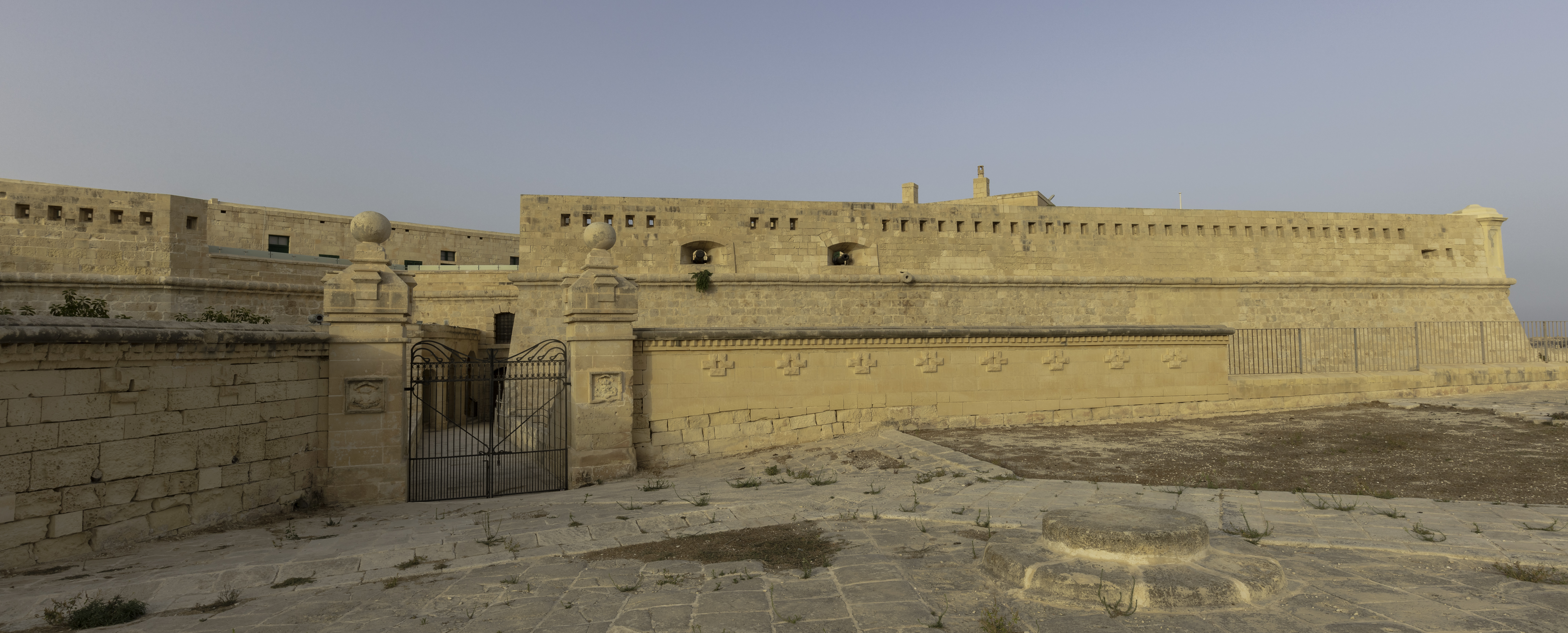
- Landward bastions of Fort Saint Elmo – one of the locations captured by the rebels – as photographed in 2021
- Date: 8 – 11 September 1775 (3 days)
- Location: Valletta, Hospitaller Malta; 35°54′7″N 14°31′7″E
- Caused by: Discontent with Ximénez' leadership and with Hospitaller rule; Tension between the Hospitallers and ecclesiastical authorities; Economic problems
- Methods: Capture of fortifications
- Result: Revolt suppressed

Parties
Rebels	(Sovereign Military Order of Malta) Knights Hospitaller

Lead figures
Gaetano Mannarino	(Sovereign Military Order of Malta) Francisco Ximénez de Tejada (Sovereign Military Order of Malta) Emmanuel de Rohan-Polduc (Sovereign Military Order of Malta) De Ribas (Sovereign Military Order of Malta) D'Hannoville (Sovereign Military Order of Malta) De Guiron

Number
c. 16–28 priests and clerics c. 43–300 laymen	c. 50–100 men (assault on St. James Cavalier)

Casualties and losses
1 killed Several wounded 64 detained, of whom: 3 executed; 19 exiled; 36 imprisoned for life; 6 pardoned	1 killed Several wounded

The Rising of the Priests (Maltese: Ir-Rewwixta tal-Qassisin), also known as the September 1775 Rebellion, was an uprising against the Knights Hospitaller which broke out in Valletta, Hospitaller Malta in September 1775. It came about after an extended period of political and economic tension following the death of Grand Master Manuel Pinto da Fonseca in 1773. The magistracy of his successor, Francisco Ximénez de Tejada, was characterised by largely unsuccessful attempts to alleviate economic problems and disputes between the Hospitallers and Bishop of Malta Giovanni Carmine Pellerano.

These tensions led to an open revolt by a small group of Maltese clergy and laymen under the leadership of the priest Don Gaetano Mannarino on 8 September 1775. The rebels took control of Fort Saint Elmo and Saint James Cavalier – two key locations within the fortifications of Valletta – but their actions failed to instigate a wider Maltese uprising. The Hospitallers quickly assaulted and recaptured the Cavalier, and the rebels surrendered the fort by 11 September after a series of negotiations.

Two individuals, a Hospitaller knight and a priest, were killed and some others were wounded during the uprising. 64 people were arrested and imprisoned by the Hospitallers for their role in the revolt; three of them were executed while the rest were exiled or imprisoned, many of them for life. Mannarino was among those imprisoned; he was ultimately released over two decades later in 1798, when Hospitaller rule ended with the French occupation of Malta.

== Political and economic background ==
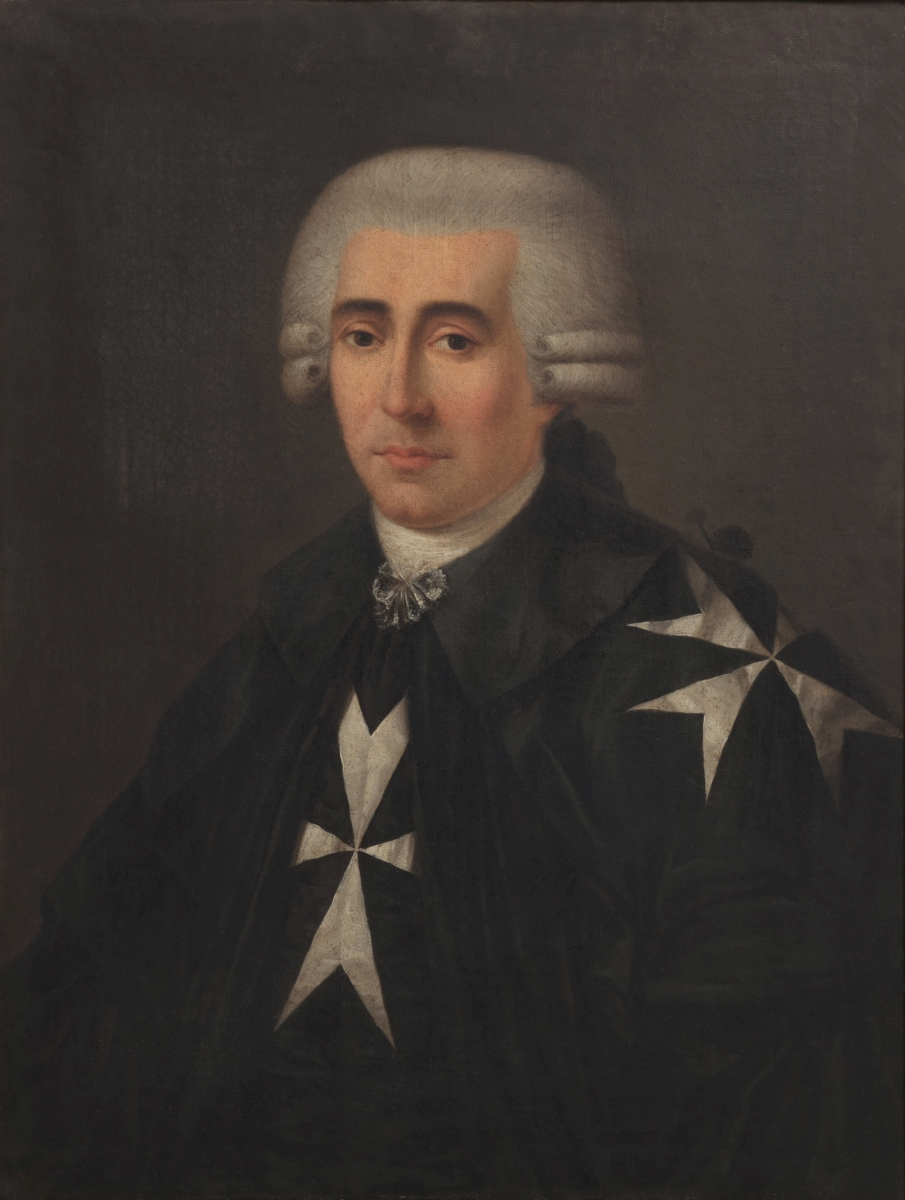
Portrait of Grand Master Francisco Ximénez de Tejada by an unknown artist

During the 18th century, the Knights Hospitaller ruled Malta and had de facto sovereignty over the islands. By the later years of Grand Master Manuel Pinto da Fonseca's magistracy, Hospitaller power and prestige was declining on the international stage and this was exacerbated by decadence and financial mismanagement on Pinto's part, which led to the bankruptcy of the Università. Around the time of Pinto's death in early 1773, there was already a sense of unrest and general discontent on Malta, creating conditions for a potential uprising.

Francisco Ximénez de Tejada succeeded Pinto as Grand Master on 28 January 1773. Ximénez, who had previously been a financial administrator, attempted to reform the Order's finances and had to deal with a wheat shortage days after his election to the magistracy. He increased the price of grain in an attempt to revive cash flow to the Massa Frumentaria and he cut government spending; these measures made him unpopular, and an increase in crime was recorded during his tenure.

Ximénez issued an edict banning the hunting of hares on 14 February 1773, causing discontent among both the Maltese peasantry and the clergy; the latter had not expected the ban to apply to them as they generally enjoyed exemptions from the Hospitallers' secular jurisdiction. Although both the knights and the Catholic Church on Malta were subordinate to the authority of the Pope in Rome, at times there were rivalries and tensions between the Hospitaller and ecclesiastical authorities. Bishop Giovanni Carmine Pellerano pressured Ximénez to allow clergy to hunt and the latter eventually gave in, initially exempting clergy before lifting the ban entirely in August 1773.

Ximénez' early efforts at financial reform were largely unsuccessful, and later in 1773 he introduced further austerity measures including the abolition of administrative posts, the reduction of salaries and the suspension of government funding for the Pubblica Università di Studi Generali. Fears of a food riot in September 1773 led to increased security measures in the capital Valletta and Floriana; around the same time Ximénez attempted to increase the price of grain again, but he withdrew the edict after protests by members of his council.

In late 1773 and 1774, the hare hunting law was reinstated and repealed several times, and there were shortages of wine while prices of meat, oil, wine and bread increased due to inflation. Ximénez made Malta a free port but trade with the nearby Kingdom of Sicily was limited since the latter was also suffering grain shortages and there were diplomatic disputes between the Hospitallers and Sicilians; efforts were also made to trade with other European and North African ports. The situation had somewhat improved by late 1774, but popular discontent persisted. On one occasion, graffiti which read Poveri Maltesi, in che miserie vi ha portato questo Gran Maestro (Italian for "Poor Maltese, what miseries has this Grand Master brought you into?") was found written on the Grand Master's Palace, and there were open threats of a rebellion akin to the Sicilian Vespers.

The hare hunting ban resulted in several incidents involving clergy and game wardens, and it became a catalyst for further disputes between the Bishop and Grand Master. One of the Bishop's manservants was arrested and beaten up by Hospitaller soldiers on board one of their galleys, prompting the Bishop's police to arrest the soldiers who were then freed by Hospitaller knights who broke into the Bishop's prison. Bishop Pellerano then fled his palace in Valletta and moved to the one in Mdina; following several other incidents, he was suspended by the Pope and was called to Rome to explain his actions. Pellerano left the island in April 1775.

Grain prices were increased again in May 1775 in an attempt to save the Massa Frumentaria, despite protests by Maltese jurats, the governor of Mdina and several high-ranking Hospitaller knights. Another increase in crime prompted harsh laws in June 1775, and although prices of some foods did decrease in July 1775, demands to reduce the price of grain were rejected.

== Uprising ==
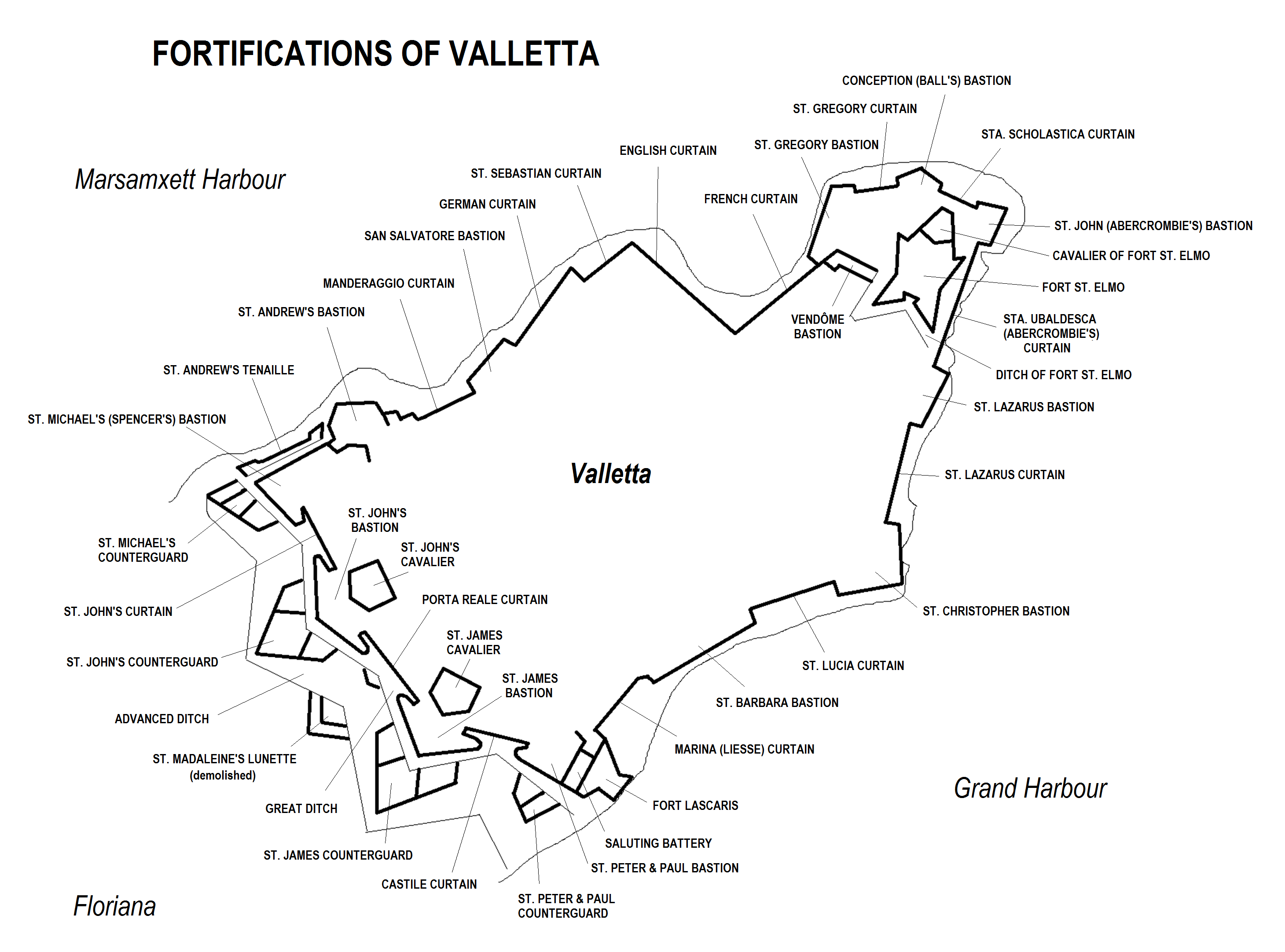
Map of the fortifications of Valletta, with Fort St. Elmo at the northeast tip of the peninsula and St. James Cavalier along the city's land front

Ximénez' unpopularity and the political tension eventually culminated in an armed uprising led by the priest Don Gaetano Mannarino. The Marquis Cavalcabo, an agent of the Russian empress Catherine the Great, is alleged to have played a role in spreading dissatisfaction among the rebels and he might have hinted at Russian support in case an uprising broke out. Mannarino met with other conspirators in the sacristy of the Church of Our Lady of Sorrows in Pietà, and the rebels chose the feast day of the Nativity of Mary, 8 September 1775, as the date of their rebellion. This had symbolic significance as it was also the anniversary of the end of the Great Siege of Malta of 1565, and it made strategic sense because at that time the Hospitaller fleet was supporting the Spanish Navy on an expedition to Algiers, leaving Valletta somewhat undefended.

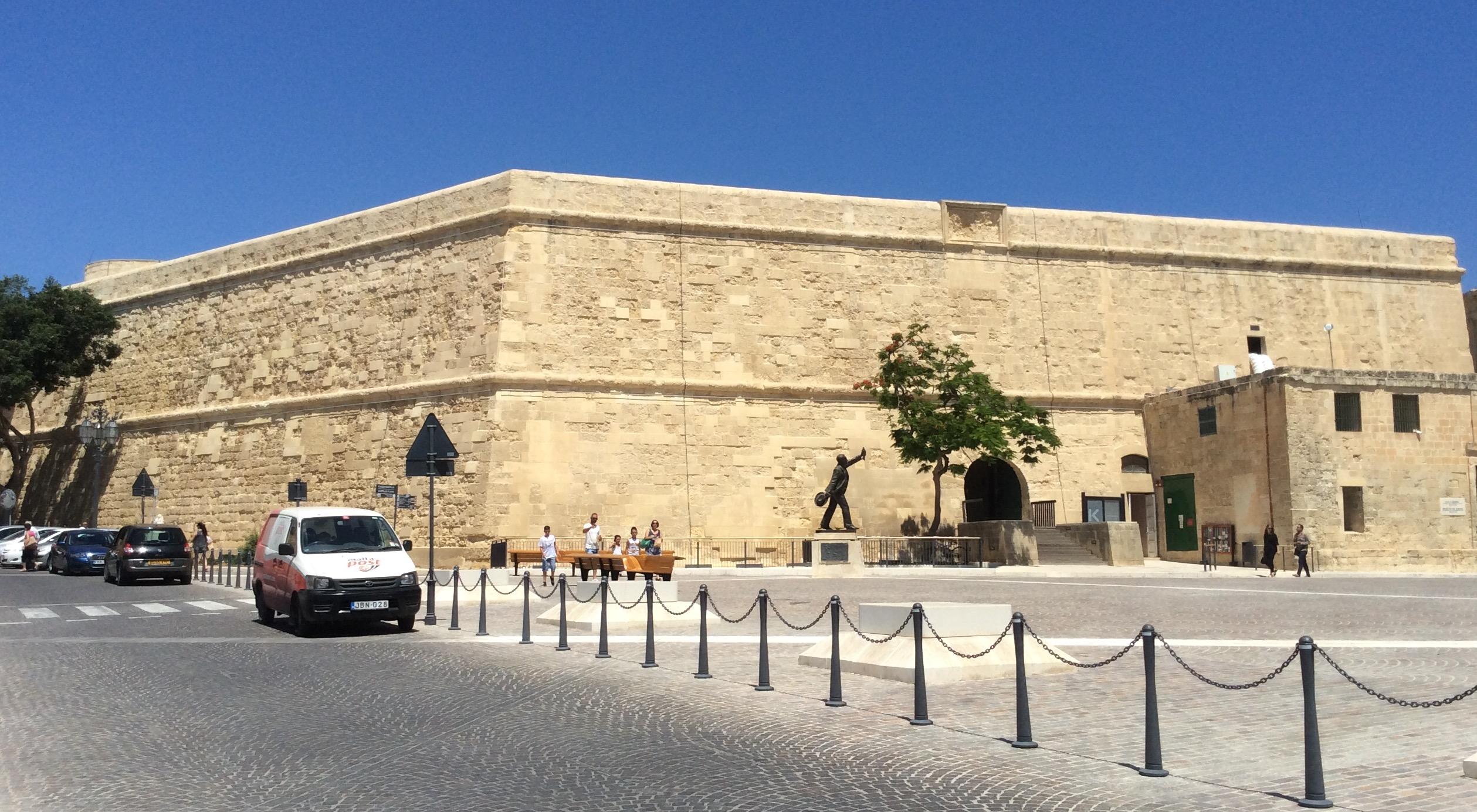
Saint James Cavalier as photographed in 2016

The rebellion involved the capture of two key locations at each end of the fortifications of Valletta: Fort Saint Elmo and Saint James Cavalier. At dusk on 8 September, while Ximénez was conducting celebrations at the Conventual Church of Saint John, Mannarino led a small group of men to Fort Saint Elmo, where corporal Antonio Antonurso of the Magistral Regiment and a dismissed soldier helped them gain access. They disarmed and imprisoned Major de Guiron, two knights and ten soldiers and took control of the fort. Simultaneously, a second group of rebels gained access to the Cavalier using a spare or false key; by 02:00 on 9 September both locations were under the control of the rebels. The rebels lowered the Order's flags from both fortresses and raised their own flags instead. Some sources claim that these were white and red standards while others claim that they were banners of Saint Paul. At around 05:00, the rebels in St. Elmo fired a cannon shot and this was answered by another shot from the Cavalier, alerting the city to the insurrection.

The rebels' aims are said to have included the revival of the Maltese Consiglio Popolare, and they hoped that their actions would instigate a popular uprising in the countryside which would be led by disgruntled members of the Maltese nobility, but this failed to materialise. The Marquis Cavalcabo likewise did not support the rebellion. The Hospitallers reacted quickly to the insurrection, instituting martial law and effectively placing the inhabitants of Valletta under house arrest, although a group of people are said to have gathered in the square in front of the Grand Master's Palace in support of the Hospitallers. An ad hoc militia known as the Corpo di Guardia was quickly raised to quell the uprising, and the knights Emmanuel de Rohan-Polduc and De Ribas were appointed as generals in charge of the Hospitaller forces. The governor of Mdina, who had been in Valletta when the revolt broke out, was ordered to return to his city and ensure that calm was maintained in the countryside.

In an attempt to avert bloodshed, Ximénez opened negotiations with the rebels and sent Vicar General Gaetano Grech as an emissary. The rebels demanded an amnesty for themselves, the safeguarding of Maltese privileges, and a reduction in the price of grain. While negotiations were ongoing, the Hospitaller council decided to retake St. James Cavalier by force, and some 50 to 100 men led by a certain D'Hannoville opened fire on the rebels and regained control of the Cavalier in less than an hour. The Hospitallers suffered a single casualty, the knight Mario Curio who was killed by rebel gunfire. Four rebels were captured within the Cavalier.

Negotiations between the Hospitallers and the rebels in St. Elmo continued, and Ximénez pledged not to subject them to corporal punishment and promised to consider the price reduction, in return for 12 of the rebels surrendering and leaving the fort; Mannarino only sent out 6 men but the Order's council accepted these terms. At one point the rebels threatened to blow up the fort's gunpowder magazine, which would have caused severe damage. (Note: Blowing up the magazine would have potentially been devastating. When the magazine in Birgu accidentally exploded in 1806, around 200 people were killed and part of the city's fortifications was destroyed. During the Froberg mutiny in 1807, Fort Ricasoli's magazine was blown up by mutineers, killing three people and destroying a bastion.) Meanwhile, Major de Guiron and the knights imprisoned in Fort St. Elmo were released from their cells after they pledged not to harm the rebels; they then provided the rebels with liquers and wine, and after they became drunk, the major and knights released the remaining soldiers from their cells. The priest Don Giuseppe Velasti shot at de Guiron and missed, and the latter returned fire and killed the priest; at this point the rebels fell into disarray. By the night of 11 September, after it became clear that there would be no general uprising or any Russian assistance, Mannarino and the remaining rebels surrendered and were imprisoned by the Hospitallers.

One Hospitaller knight and one rebel priest were killed during the course of the revolt; several others were wounded. The exact number of people involved in the uprising is unclear. One report lists 17 individuals including 3 who were declared to be innocent, but also refers to other accomplices who managed to flee without being caught. Mannarino himself claimed that 28 ecclesiastics were involved but only 18 of them showed up on the day of the uprising. An inquisition report claimed that the number was 16 ecclesiastics, 5 of whom escaped. In total, the Hospitallers arrested and punished 64 people for their role in the revolt; 3 of these were executed, 19 were exiled, 36 were imprisoned for life and 6 were pardoned after some time in prison. Some sources claim that there were initially 13 rebels including Mannarino in Fort St. Elmo and 5 in the Cavalier, but they were later joined by some sympathetic Maltese. One source claims that the total number of rebels was some 300 men.

== Trials and sentences ==
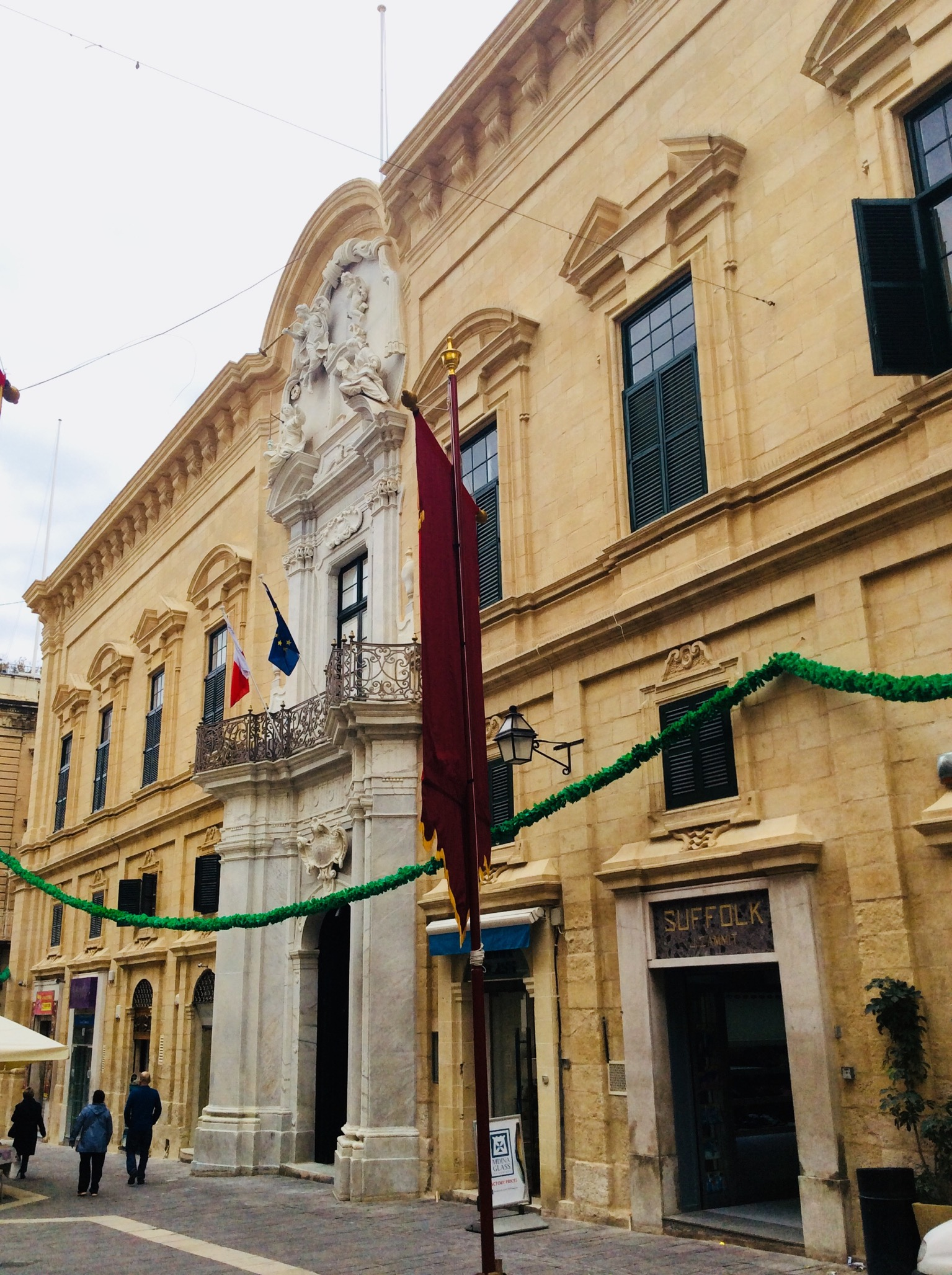
The Castellania as photographed in 2018

The Hospitallers charged the rebels with illegally taking possession of the Cavalier and fort and raising flags other than that of the "Sacred Religion", thus constituting an act of rebellion against the Order. The 64 people who were punished for their role in the revolt are known from the records of the Magna Curia Castellania; only one third of them were priests or clerics and the remaining two thirds were laymen. These consisted of:

- 4 laymen who had been captured inside St. James Cavalier and were subsequently imprisoned at the Castellania. Three of them (Pasquale Balzan, Michele Tonna and Claudio Chircop) were executed by strangling. The fourth man was given a life sentence as a rower on the Order's galleys, but this was commuted to exile.
- 11 laymen who had been captured inside Fort St. Elmo and were subsequently imprisoned at the Castellania. Five of them were exiled for life while six were pardoned and released.
- 3 priests and 4 clerics who were held at the Episcopal Prisons before being exiled for life.
- 3 priests and 3 clerics who were held at Fort St. Elmo before being exiled for life.
- 8 priests and 28 laymen who are believed to have been imprisoned for life at Fort St. Elmo.

The three executions were carried out in violation of the promised amnesty on Ximénez' direct orders, reportedly after Castellania judges had declined to sign decrees for their executions. The sentences were meted out on 13 September, and after strangulation their bodies were decapitated and the heads were displayed on pikes along the cavalier's walls on 14 September. On 20 October, the trial of the 11 laymen began in Fort St. Elmo and a trial of 5 other laymen was held at the Castellania. Ximénez died on 4 November and was succeeded as Grand Master by de Rohan; the latter ordered the removal of the severed heads from the cavalier and continued the trials until 25 November.

The revolt's leader Don Gaetano Mannarino was the most prominent figure among the 36 people imprisoned for life; also imprisoned with him were two of his brothers, the priest Don Antonio Mannarino and the cleric Gio. Battista Mannarino, along with other individuals from a variety of social classes. A certain Don Michele from Casal Zebbug is also included in this list, possibly a reference to Dun Mikiel Xerri. Gaetano Mannarino was released from prison in June 1798, after Malta was occupied by France during the French Revolutionary Wars.

== Aftermath and historiography ==
After the uprising, there were rumours that Ximénez would reduce the price of grain on 4 October, his birthday, but this did not happen. The Grand Master did however reduce the price ten days later, although not by as much as was desired by the populace. After Ximénez' death, the new Grand Master de Rohan lowered the price to a more reasonable figure in December 1775.

The Hospitallers prepared an official report entitled Relazione di Quanto è Occorso nell'Isola di Malta in Congiuntura della Ribellione di una Truppa di Sacerdoti e Chierici (Italian for "Account of what happened on the Island of Malta in conjunction with the Rebellion of a Troop of Priests and Clerics") which was sent to Pope Pius VI; this did not mention that the majority of the individuals arrested had been laymen and not clergy, and it blamed the latter for the uprising.

Although the ecclesiastical authorities were not involved in the uprising, since several individual priests were personally involved the event came to be popularly known as the Rising of the Priests or Insurrection of the Priests. Since the role played by priests and clerics in the revolt might have been purposely exaggerated by the Hospitallers for political reasons, this name has been challenged by some historians who instead use more neutral terms such as the September 1775 Rebellion. The uprising is sometimes seen as an episode of proto-nationalism and a precursor to Malta's later struggle for political independence, although this assessment has been challenged.
