= Massa Frumentaria =

Medieval grain fund established in Malta

- Founded: 1635
- Defunct: 1997
- Average annual profit from grain sales (prior to 1798): 132,000 scudi (A scudo was equivalent to 3 days wages, while at the time Malta's population was around 110,000).
- Equivalent to £11,000 (adjusted to 2024 value of money: £1,562,000* or €1,845,000**)
- Liquid assets before 1798: 1,203,660 scudi
- equivalent to £100,305 in 1798 / £14,240,000* or €16,820,000** in 2024 values
- Total Assets before 1798: Around 1,800,000 scudi
- equivalent to £150,000 in 1798 / £21,300,000* or €25,159,000** in 2024 values
- NB * equivalent 2024 value estimated by https://measuringworth.com/
- NB ** using the European Central Bank Average Reference Exchange Rate for 2024 of 0.84662 – https://www.ecb.europa.eu/stats/policy_and_exchange_rates/euro_reference_exchange_rates/html/eurofxref-graph-gbp.en.html)

Massa Frumentaria or Monte Frumentario was a medieval grain fund established in Malta. As a public institution, it was tasked with the importation and distribution of wheat and other commodities, while also serving as a precursor to an investment bank. The fund was administered by the Università, a municipal body under the control of the Knights of St. John, and later continued under British protection until its dissolution in 1818.

The institution shared a similar goal to the Italian monti frumentari, which proliferated between the late 15th and 17th centuries and were designed to ensure food security and provide financial support to local agricultural communities. Though developed independently, similar institutions were founded throughout Italy to provide wheat and barley for sowing to impoverished farmers, subject to repayment, particularly those living at subsistence levels, who, because of poverty, were compelled to consume seeds intended for planting or resort to usurers.

== Historical background ==
In the mid-thirteenth century, Abate Giliberto indicated that the population of the Maltese islands consisted of 1,119 families. At the time, Maltese agriculture transitioned from subsistence agriculture to a more commerce-based one through the cultivation for export of cotton and cumin, which were introduced during the Arab period. As a result, there was a need to import food from neighbouring Sicily. The Università, or Council of Jurors, was a semi-autonomous mediaeval municipal council based in ⁣⁣Mdina⁣⁣ and established in 1397, similar to other Sicilian administrative councils as a result of the turbulent political situation in the then Kingdom of Sicily. The Università had various functions, including the acquisition of wheat, particularly from Licata every April. In 1398, Malta was exempted from trading licences and taxes on grain imports, a privilege previously reserved solely for the city of Messina. Eventually, in the late fourteenth century, cotton production became the principal agricultural product of the Maltese archipelago, since it was one of the few production hubs in the western Mediterranean. Processing cotton to weave it into the fabric was a labour-intensive activity, so the boost in cotton trade led to the population surging to 33,000.

In an exploratory mission in 1524, the Knights of St. John noted how the islands were dependent on grain imports since agriculture was dedicated to the production of cotton, honey and cumin. The Knights of St John (later called the Knights of Malta) arrived in Malta in 1530, after Emperor Charles V granted them the islands as a fief. In 1536, Grand Master Juan de Homedes reorganised the Università, dividing it into two municipalities: Mdina and Birgu, the latter being where the Order had established its first headquarters. Subsequently, after the Great Siege of 1565, the Knights and the Università relocated to Valletta. Directly overseen by the Knights, it ensured that the populace was well nourished to prevent political unrest, and in the event of insurrection, this could be swiftly quelled, as they managed all grain reserves. Under the Knights, the primary function of the Università was the administration of food supply, particularly grain, as well as the excavation of numerous rock-hewn subterranean granaries, known locally as "Il-Fosos". By 1741, the population is estimated to have reached 110,000.

Archival records indicate that a grain fund was formally established by 1635 known as Massa Frumentaria to provide a stable and affordable supply of grain. The Università received private capital from wealthy citizens, which was invested at a fixed interest rate. The fund was managed by a designated official referred to as the Depositario, who supervised the financial operations and grain procurement.

== Structure and role ==
The Massa Frumentaria operated through a system of ledgers and registers that recorded:

- Names of investors
- Amounts invested
- Interest rates and earnings
- Dates of investment and maturity
- Details of grain shipments and vessels used

Investments were typically made for two-year periods, while interest was disbursed semi-annually. The fund also maintained ledgers, indexes and registers for efficient record-keeping. During the French occupation of Malta (1798–1800), investors were referred to as "Cittadini", reflecting the egalitarian terminology of the French Republic.

The Massa Frrmentaria played a dual role:

- Food Security: It facilitated the importation of wheat from Sicily (mainly from Licata) and occasionally Sardinia, particularly during shortages.
- Financial Services: It operated almost similar to a bank, offering attractive rates of return, ranging from 3% to 6%, to affluent citizens financing its operations. It also extended loans to farmers who were accustomed to borrowing from the Massa Frumentaria to purchase tools, seeds, and manure at very low interest rates.

== Decline and dissolution ==
In its final years, the Order was in financial difficulties and the Massa Frumentaria, whose average annual profit from corn sales was roughly 132,000 scudi, began to suffer from financial misappropriation:

- In 1728, Grand Master António Manoel de Vilhena diverted funds from the Massa Frumentaria to finance the construction of his palace in Mdina and to carry out repairs to the city's fortifications.
- Successive Grand Masters continued this practice, using reserves for various infrastructural and administrative expenses and by 1741, the total amount appropriated from the Massa Frumentaria had reached nearly half a million scudi.
- Grand Master Manuel Pinto de Fonseca served as the 68th Grand Master of the Order, holding the longest tenure in the history of the Knights. Pinto was a patron of architecture and the arts, introducing the Baroque style across Malta. His major contributions include the reconstruction of the Auberge de Castille, the embellishment of the Grand Master’s palace, the Pinto warehouses along the Grand Harbour waterfront, and the Castellania building. Despite Malta's prosperous economy, Pinto exceeded the Order's financial capacity, resulting in a debt of approximately two million scudi by the conclusion of his reign. Pinto himself had appropriated 293,000 scudi.

The silver scudo (plural: scudi) served as Malta's currency until 1798 and continued to circulate until 1825, when it was substituted by the British pound at an exchange rate of £1 = 12 scudi. At the turn of the 18th century, a farm labourer's daily income was only about one-third of a scudo. (The daily wage for a farm labourer at the beginning of the 1800s was 6¾ pence. The British pound sterling was subdivided into 20 shillings, each of 12 (old) pence, making it a total of 240 pence (see Sterling prior to decimalisation), which was also equivalent to 12 scudi, meaning that one scudo was equivalent to 20 pence. Hence, a farm labourer would need to work roughly three days to earn a scudo.)

This excessive lending weakened the institution's ability to fulfil its core mission of ensuring food security to the Maltese population. Grand Master Francisco Ximenes de Texada, the 69th Grand Master of the Order of St. John, made efforts to restore fiscal discipline and address the deepening economic crisis in Malta. His austerity measures, while fiscally necessary, were deeply unpopular. In 1775, discontent culminated in the Insurrection of the Priests under the leadership of Don Gaetano Mannarino, a failed uprising against the Order's rule.

On 18 October 1836, Henry Thornton, the British-appointed Auditor-General of Malta, estimates that at the time of the capitulation of the Knights to the French, the institution had irrecoverable assets amounting to 250,000 scudi. Furthermore, during the French occupation of Malta (1798–1800), the French garrison depleted the Massa Frumentaria considerably, taking 1,203,660 scudi. The fund's assets at the time, including 23 grain stores with 75,747 salme of grain, 23 oil vats holding 25,431 cafisi (12,715 barrels) and extensive real estate holdings, valued at around 1,800,000 scudi, were confiscated. The salma (plural: salme) was a historical unit of volume in Malta, principally used for measuring grain. This unit equated to 98.5% of an imperial quarter, which thus amounting to 286.59 litres. In 1875, the British standardised it to precisely correspond with an imperial quarter, measuring 290.95 litres.

Following the French capitulation on 5 September 1800, General Pigot, leader of the British relief forces, focused on occupying Valletta, overlooking the financial interests of the Maltese. The looted funds were never returned, leaving a lasting financial impact on many Maltese. Subsequent to British annexation, Governor Sir Alexander Ball and his successors made numerous assurances to restore the lost wealth. The confiscation of the assets also resulted in the disruption of food supply to the island, causing around 2,000 fatalities and prompting many others to emigrate abroad following the Knights' departure.

Under British rule (1800–1813), the Massa Frumentaria continued to operate but faced increasing financial difficulties. The British authorities replenished the fund and constructed new granaries. However, a royal commission in 1812 determined that the fund was significantly indebted. The outbreak of plague in 1813 further strained the resources of the fund.

In 1818, Governor Sir Thomas Maitland dissolved the Università and replaced it with the Board of Supplies, effectively terminating the operations of the Massa Frumentaria. However, the fund continued to pay interest until 1995 and was formally dissolved by the end of 1997. Thornton views the British reforms as superior in terms of efficiency and cost-effectiveness; however, research (see table) contradicts his assertions.

Average Cost and Sale Prices of Grain sold to the public
Period	Average Cost price per salme	Average Sale price per salme
1781-1790	£2 0s 0p (480 pence)	£2 8s 0p (576 pence)
1791-1798	£2 6s 0p (552 pence)	£2 18s 0p (696 pence)
1801-1813	£2 13s 4p (636 pence)	£3 3s 8p (764 pence)
1814-1821	£2 5s 0p (540 pence)	£3 0s 0p (720 pence)

Thornton contends that between the end of 1832 and 1836, the average prices of imported wheat salme without duty, ranged between 25 and 35 shillings, whereas import duties varied between 10 and 11 shillings. Thus, the average cost price ranged between 36 shillings (432 pence) and 66 shillings (552 pence), which may not be superior to the Massa Frumentaria system, particularly given that the profit margins under the British were much elevated, resulting in increased prices for consumers.

== Archival records ==
The records of the Massa Frumentaria are housed in the Treasury Series C at the National Library of Malta. The collection comprises 42 volumes of ledger books, indexes, and registers dated from 1635 to 1812. They are written in Italian and offer detailed insights into the socio-economic life of Malta during the early modern era.

== Legacy ==
The Massa Frumentaria is considered a distinctive example of early public finance and food policy in Malta. It illustrates the island's reliance on grain imports, the function of municipal governance under the Knights, and the transition to British colonial administration. The discovery and documentation of its records have created opportunities for historical and archival inquiry.
