= Malta under the Kingdom of Sicily (1091–1530) =

Malta was a territory within the Kingdom of Sicily from the Norman conquest in 1091 until the islands were ceded to the Order of Saint John in 1530. During this time, it was governed by a succession of the Norman, Hohenstaufen, Angevin, Aragonese, and Spanish crowns. Malta was administered by a series of feudal lords (see Count of Malta) until the Aragonese period when Malta's administration fell in the hands of local nobility who formed a governing body called the Università. (See Maltese Università)

== Background ==
The main citadel of Melite (subsequently rebuilt as Medina and latinised as Mdina) was devastated in an Aghlabid attack in 870 AD, but archaeological evidence suggests the island remained inhabited. In 991, a census of the Maltese Islands officially recorded 14,972 Muslims and 6,339 Christians. Between 1048 and 1049, several Arabic-speaking Muslim settlers migrated from Sicily. In 982 and 1054 the Byzantines are known to have attacked the islands unsuccessfully. (See also Byzantine Malta, Muslim conquest of Malta, Siege of Melite (870) and Siege of Medina (1053–1054))

Following the fall of Melite on 29 August 870, the islands came under Arab control. This period led to the emergence of the Maltese language, along with the introduction of many Maltese surnames, place names, crops and new farming and construction practices. Islam became the dominant religion, while Christianity was restricted to a minority of slaves.

== Norman Conquest and Integration (1091-1194) ==
Main articles: Norman invasion of Malta and County of Sicily

The integration of Malta into the Sicilian domain commenced with Roger I of Sicily's mission in 1091, during the Norman advance in southern Italy and the central Mediterranean. Mediaeval records indicate that Roger's troops arrived in Malta, where the indigenous Muslim populace consented to a negotiated capitulation and tribute agreement instead of complete military occupation. Consequently, Malta became a tributary dependence of the nascent Norman state based in the Kingdom of Sicily. (see also Norman conquest of southern Italy and Norman–Arab–Byzantine culture)

Following an uprising in 1122, Roger II of Sicily reconquered the islands in 1127. In 1139, Roger II was recognised by Pope Innocent II as the first king of Sicily and of the Norman territories in southern Italy.

From the 1150s there was also Genoese influence.

In 1154, a cleric named John was appointed as Bishop of Palermo and Malta.

The islands remained largely Muslim-inhabited long after the end of Arab rule. The Arab administration was also kept in place and Muslims were allowed to practise their religion freely until the 13th century. Even in 1175, Burchard, bishop of Strasbourg, an envoy of Frederick I, Holy Roman Emperor, had the impression, based upon his brief visit to Malta, that it was mainly inhabited by Muslims.

In 1192, Tancred of Sicily designated Margaritus of Brindisi the first Count of Malta, likely due to his success in capturing Empress Constance contender to the throne.

== Hohenstaufen Period (1194-1266) ==
On 20 November 1194, Henry VI entered Palermo, the capital of the Kingdom of Sicily, and was subsequently crowned king on 25 December of the same year. This event marked the beginning of a new phase, during which Malta passed on to Swabian rulers. Guglielmo Grasso, a Genoese, was rewarded with the County of Malta on 23 December 1194. (see also History of Swabian Sicily)

According to a census in around 1241 by Abbot Gilibertus, who was the royal governor of Frederick II of Sicily during the Genoese Period of the County of Malta, in that year the islands of Malta and Gozo had 836 Muslim families, 250 Christian families and 33 Jewish families.

In 1224, Frederick II, Holy Roman Emperor, sent an expedition against Malta to establish royal control and prevent its Muslim population from helping a Muslim rebellion in the Kingdom of Sicily.

After the Norman conquest, the population of the Maltese islands kept growing mainly through immigration from the north (Sicily and Italy), with the exile to Malta of the entire male population of the town of Celano (Italy) in 1223, the stationing of a Norman and Sicilian garrison on Malta in 1240 and the settlement in Malta of noble families from Sicily between 1372 and 1450. As a consequence of this, Capelli et al. found in 2005 that "the contemporary males of Malta most likely originated from Southern Italy, including Sicily and up to Calabria."

Around 1249, some Maltese Muslims were sent to the Italian colony of Lucera, established for Sicilian Muslims. For some historians, including Godfrey Wettinger, who follow on this Ibn Khaldun, this event marked the end of Islam in Malta. According to Wettinger, "there is no doubt that by the beginning of Angevin times [i.e. shortly after 1249] no professed Muslim Maltese remained either as free persons or even as serfs on the island." The Maltese language nevertheless survived – an indication that either a large number of Christians already spoke Maltese, or that many Muslims converted and remained behind.

== Angevin Period (1266-1282) ==
During this period, Malta was dominated successively by the rulers of Anjou, In 1266, Malta was turned over in fiefdom to Charles of Anjou, brother of France's King Louis IX, who retained it in ownership until 1283. During Charles's rule religious coexistence was precarious in Malta, since he had a genuine intolerance of religions other than Roman Catholicism.

Malta's links with Africa would still remain strong until the autumn of 1282, until there was a general insurrection as part of the Sicilian Vespers (see also Battle of Malta (1283)).

== Aragonese and Spanish Rule (1282-1530) ==
Following the Battle of Malta of 1283, Malta passed to the Crown of Aragon; however, the protracted War of the Vespers only ended in 1302 with the Peace Treaties of Caltabellotta and of Villeneuve.

During this period, Malta was dominated successively by the Crown of Aragon, the Crown of Castile and Spain.

In November 1372, King Frederick IV of Sicily sailed to Malta backed by a Genoese squadron led by Tommaso Morchio to suppress a local rebellion against royal authority led by the powerful regional captain Giacomo de Pellegrino.

Martin I of Sicily appointed Guglielmo Raimondo III Moncada as Marquis of Malta in 1392 and again in 1396. A rebellion by Moncada was defeated by royal forces, leading to a long period of municipal administration by the Università in the royal demanio, except for a brief interlude in the 1420s when the Maltese islands were controlled by Gonsalvo de Monroy. The Università had various functions, including the acquisition of wheat, particularly from Licata every April.

In September 1429, Hafsid Saracens attempted to capture Malta but were repelled by the Maltese. The invaders pillaged the countryside and took about 3,000 inhabitants as slaves. (See Siege of Malta (1429))

Malta became part of the Spanish Empire when Malta, under the Crown of Aragon, was joined with Castile in 1469. settlement in Malta of noble families from Sicily between 1372 and 1450. As a consequence of this, Capelli et al. found in 2005 that "the contemporary males of Malta most likely originated from Southern Italy, including Sicily and up to Calabria."

By the end of the 15th century, Maltese Muslims were subjected to Christian conversion and Muslim identity disguised by Latinizing or adopting new surnames. By the year 1530, the population has been estimated to have reached 33,000.

== Hospitaller rule (1530–1798) ==
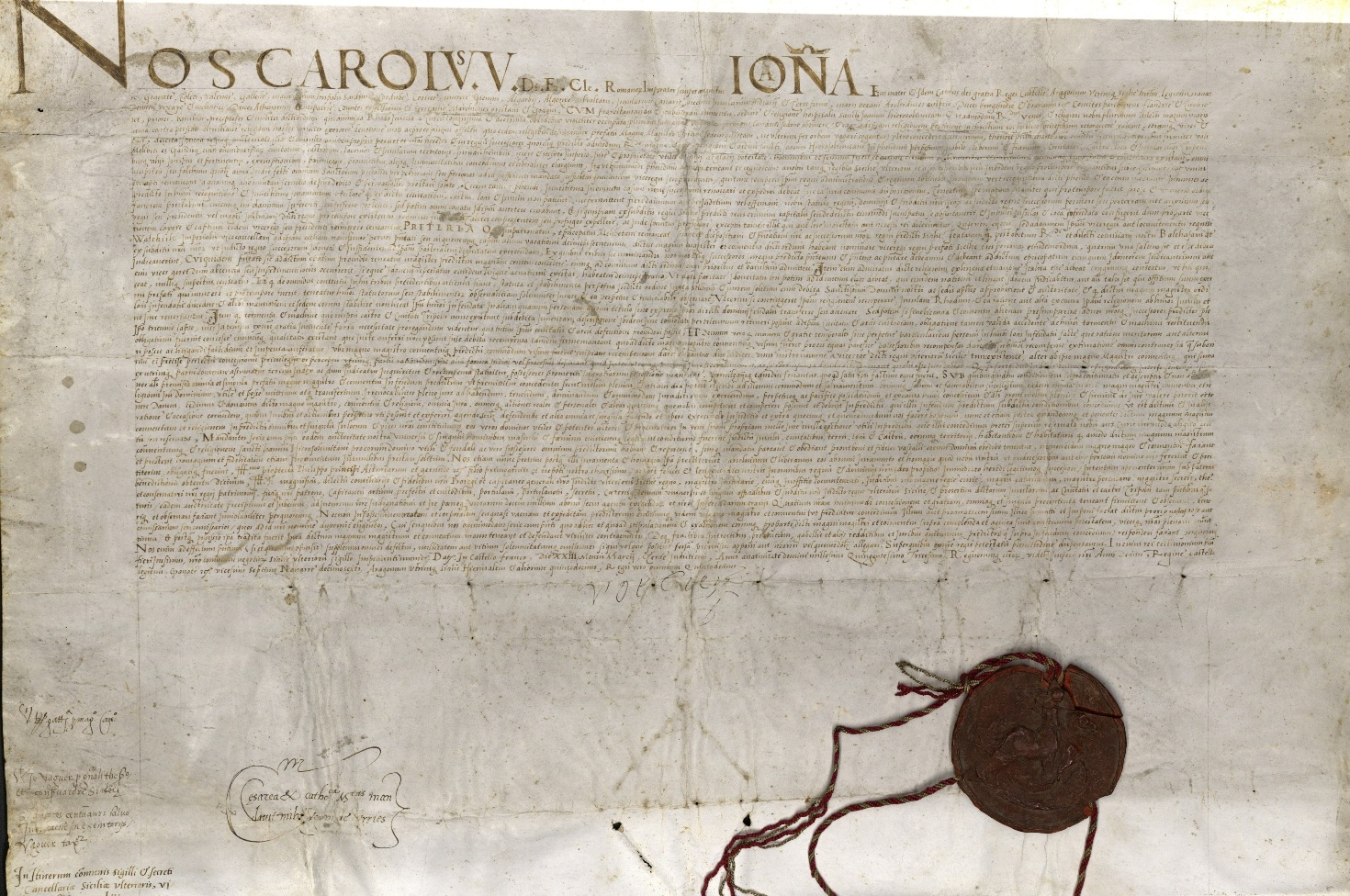
Deed of Donation of the islands of Malta, Gozo and Tripoli to the Order of St. John by Emperor Charles V in 1530.

In the early 16th century, the Ottoman Empire spread into South-East Europe. The Spanish king Charles V feared that if Rome fell to the Turks, it would be the end of Christian Europe. He wanted a strong Christian military presence in the central Mediterranean to help defend Sicily and southern Italy from Ottoman and Barbary corsair attacks.

In 1522, Suleiman I drove the Knights Hospitaller of St. John out of Rhodes and dispersed to their commanderies in Europe.

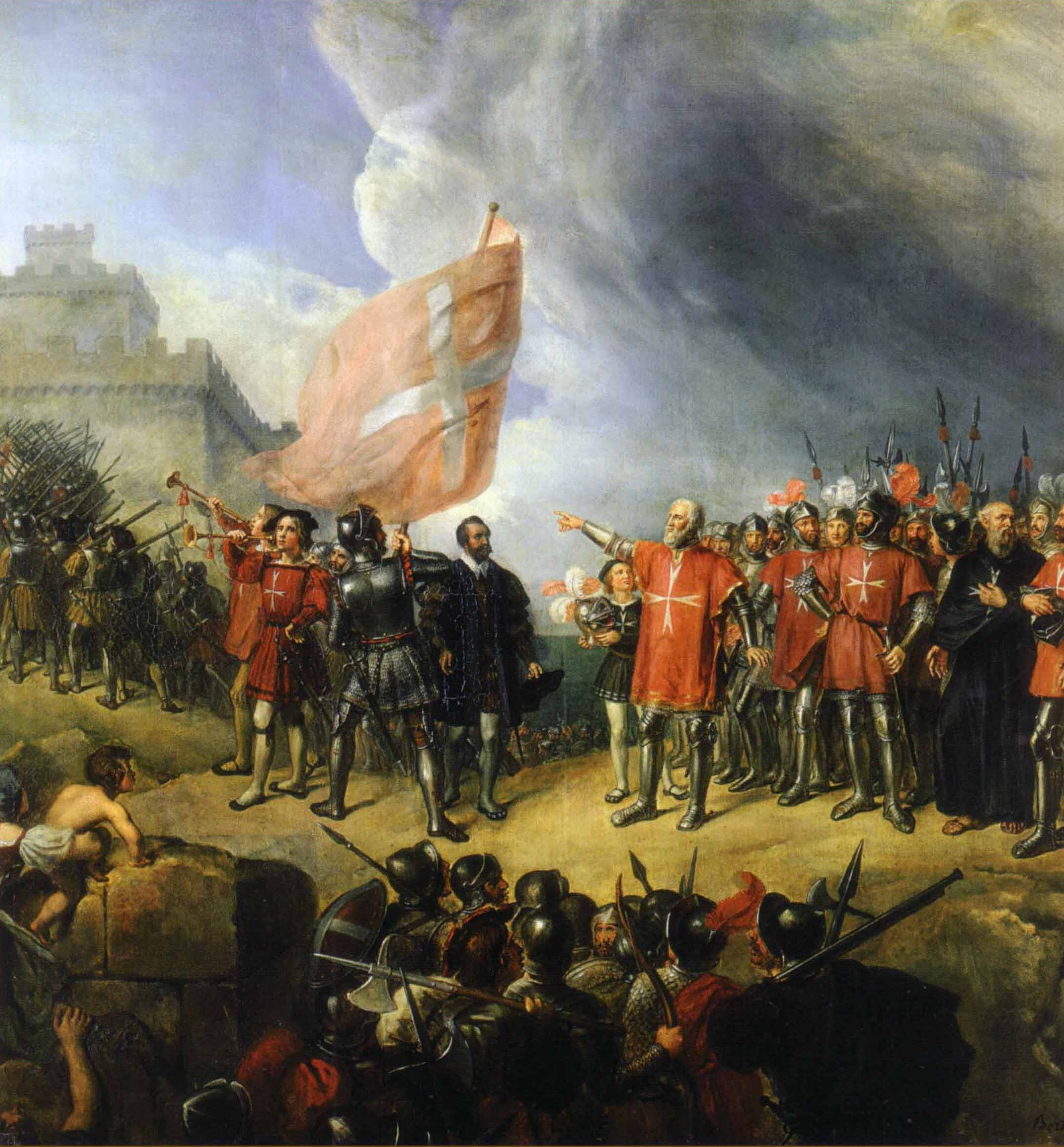
Philippe Villiers de L'Isle-Adam takes possession of the island of Malta, 26 October 1530 by René Théodore Berthon

Wanting to protect Rome from invasion from the south, in 1530, Charles V handed the Maltese Islands and Tripoli to the Knights as a perpetual fief against a symbolic annual tribute of one falcon, ending the demanial rule.

The Knights established de facto sovereign control over the islands and transformed them into a fortified naval base following the construction of Valletta and major fortifications until their expulsion by Napoleon on 10 June 1798.

== French occupation (1798–1800), British protectorate and Crown Colony (1800–1814) ==
The French garrison in Gozo capitulated on 28 October 1798 and it was agreed that Gozo was to fly the Neapolitan flag. (See also French occupation of Malta and State of Gozo (1798–1800). The French garrison in Malta surrendered to the British on 4 September 1800, and the Maltese islands became a British protectorate, starting a long period of British military administration. (See Malta Protectorate). The Malta Protectorate eventually became a Crown Colony on 23 July 1813, later confirmed by the Treaty of Paris (1814) formally ending any claims by the Kingdom of Sicily. (See Crown Colony of Malta).

== See also ==
Kingdom of Sicily

History of Sicily
