= Ximenes Redoubt =

18th-century fort in Naxxar, Malta

- Ridott ta' Ximenes
- Naxxar, Malta
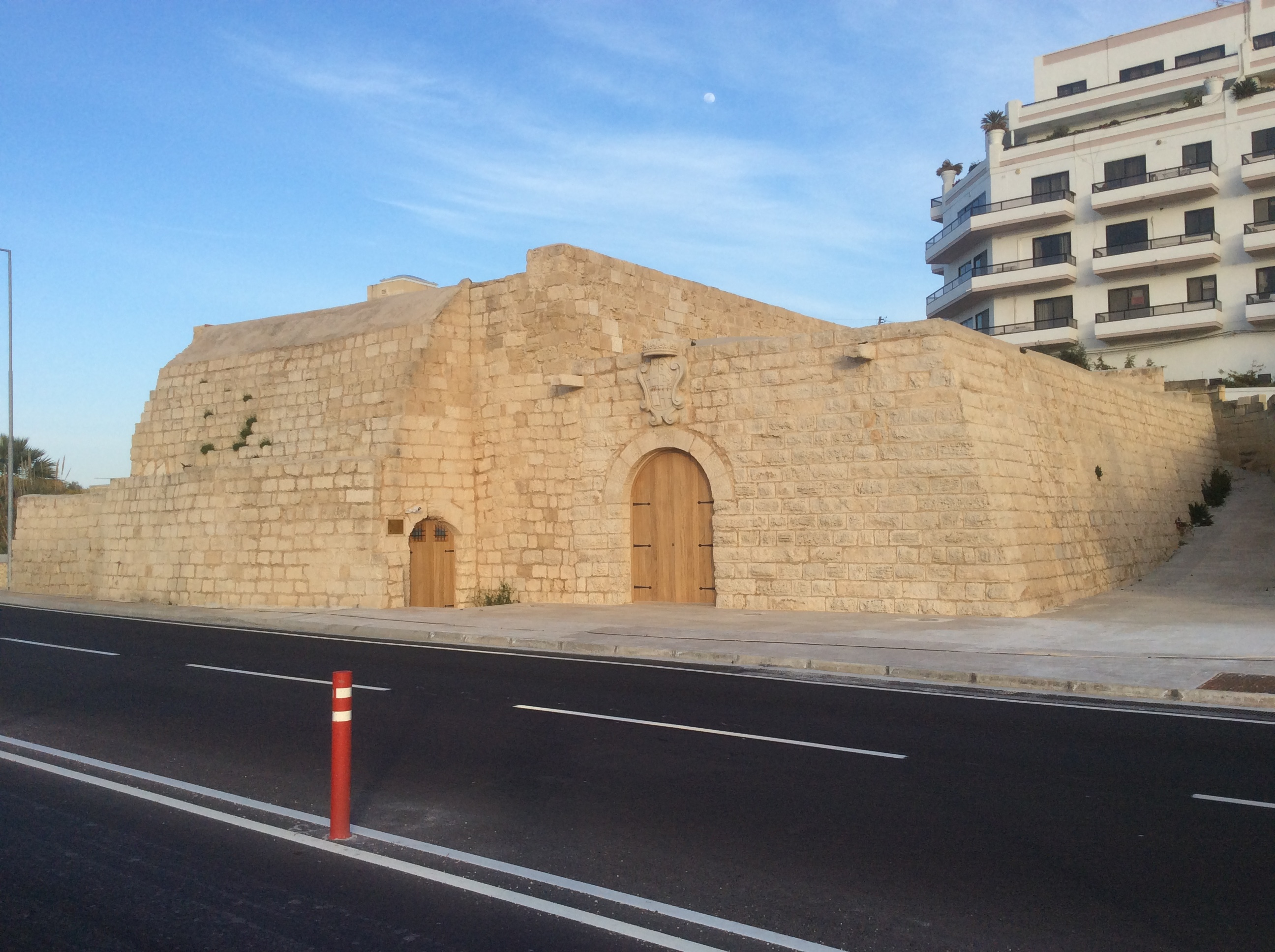
- View of Ximenes Redoubt

Site information
- Type: Redoubt
- Owner: Government of Malta
- Controlled by: MRRA
- Condition: Intact

Location
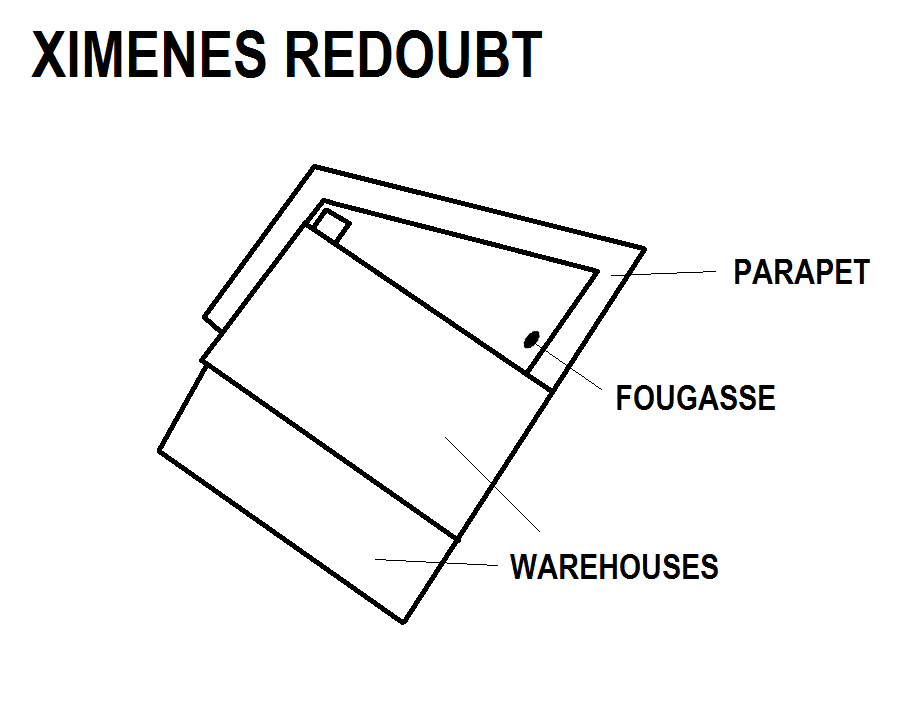
- Map of Ximenes Redoubt including its warehouses
- Coordinates: 35°56′52.4″N 14°25′32.7″E

Site history
- Built: 1715–1716
- Built by: Order of Saint John
- Materials: Limestone

Ximenes Redoubt (Maltese: Ridott ta' Ximenes) is a redoubt in Salina Bay, Naxxar, Malta. It was built by the Order of Saint John in 1715-1716 as one of a series of coastal fortifications around the Maltese Islands, and was originally called Salina Right Redoubt. Two warehouses were grafted on the redoubt in the second half of the 18th century so as to store salt from nearby salt pans. It was eventually renamed after Grand Master Francisco Ximénez de Tejada, whose coat of arms can be seen on one of the warehouses. The redoubt and warehouses have been recently restored.

== History ==
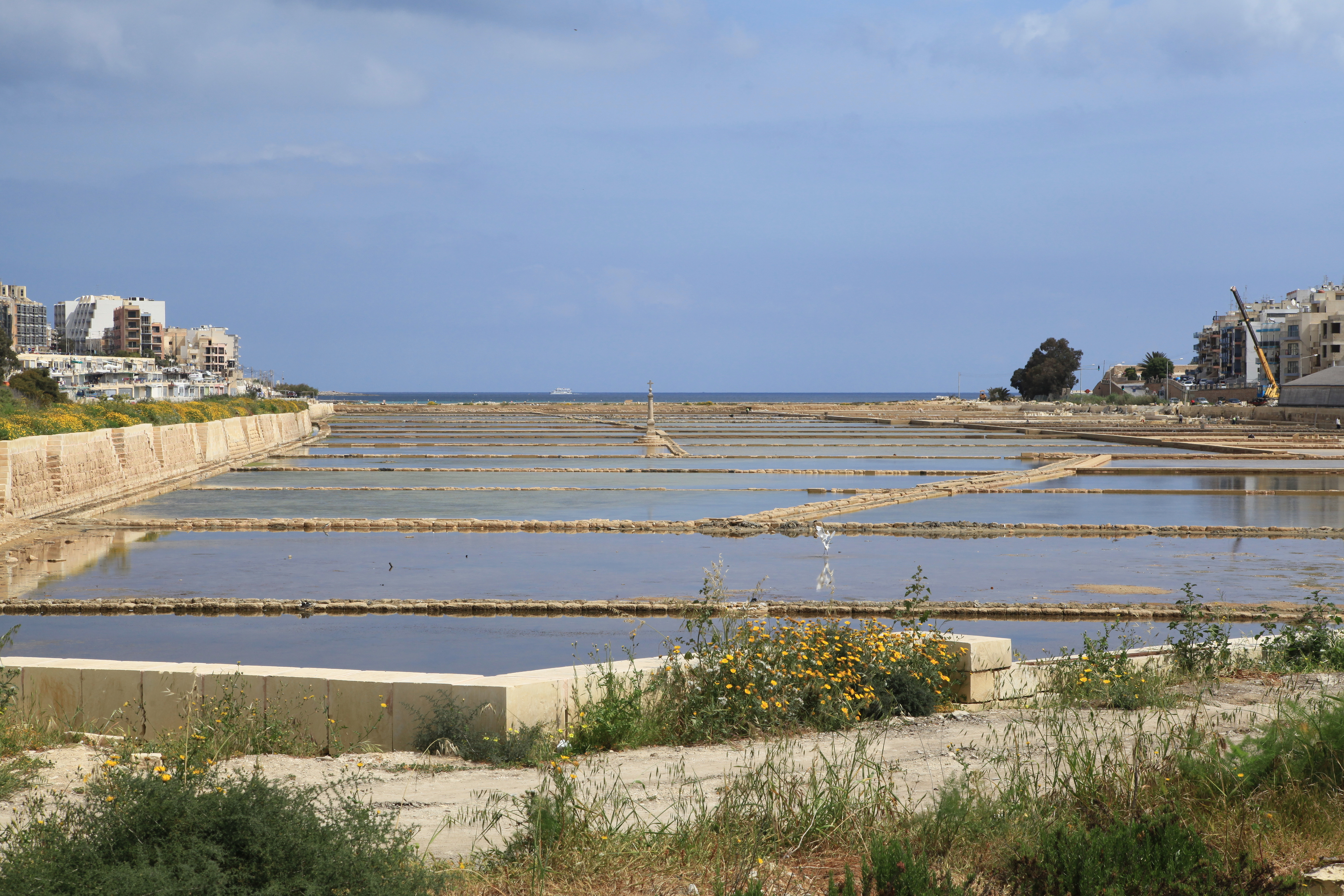
Ximenes Redoubt eventually became a warehouse storing salt from the nearby Salina salt pans

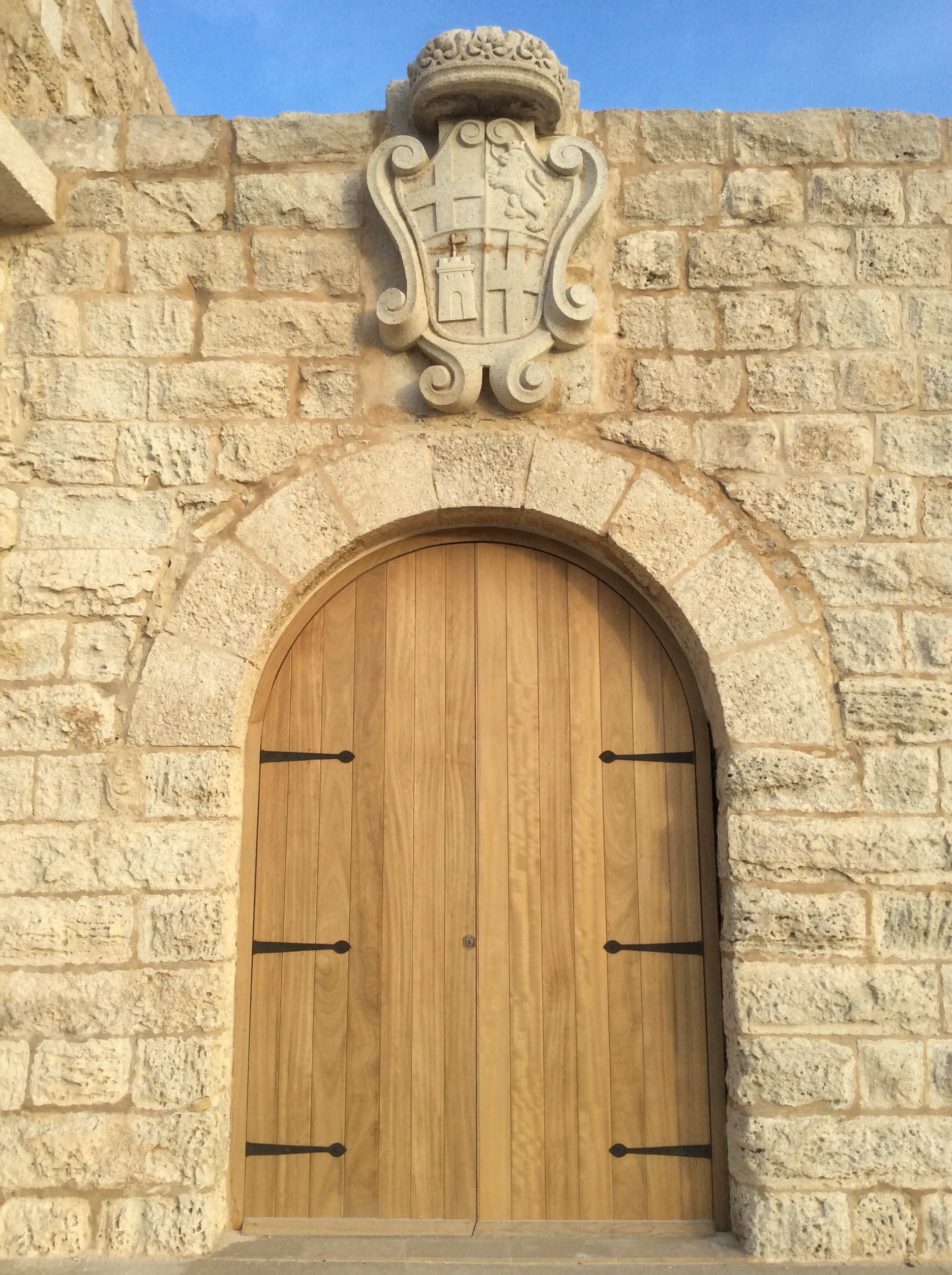
Redoubt entrance

Salina Right Redoubt was built in 1715 and 1716 as part of the Order of Saint John's first building program of coastal fortifications. It was one of two redoubts defending Salina Bay. The redoubt on the other side of the bay, known as Perellos Redoubt, was demolished after World War II.

The redoubt was unique in Malta, as it was the only one which consisted of just a polygonal enclosure with a high parapet wall designed to protect infantrymen. It did not have a blockhouse, which was a feature found in most other redoubts in the Maltese islands. Since it was a small work, it only cost 316 scudi, 9 tari, 10 grani and 2 piccoli to build, which was less than one third the cost of an average redoubt.

After 1741, two fougasses were built, one within the redoubt and another just outside its wall. One of the fougasses still survives today, and it is among the best preserved ones to be found in Malta.

In about 1750, a large building was grafted onto the redoubt. It served as both a magazine and a warehouse, to serve as storage space for salt from the nearby salt pans at Salina. A second warehouse was built in the 1770s, during the reign of Grand Master Francisco Ximénez de Tejada. The new warehouse had a large escutcheon with Ximenes' coat of arms above the doorway, and the redoubt became known as the Ximenes Redoubt.

The redoubt did not have any armament, equipment or munitions in 1785.

== Present day ==
Today, the redoubt lies on the Baħar iċ-Ċagħaq–Salina coast road, and it is overshadowed by the Coastline Hotel. The redoubt as well as the nearby salt pans were restored between 2011 and 2013.

In 2013, the redoubt was vandalized when graffiti were sprayed on one of its walls. This has since been removed.
