= Church of Our Lady of Sorrows, Pietà =

Church of Our Lady of Sorrows
- Knisja tal-Madonna tad-Duluri
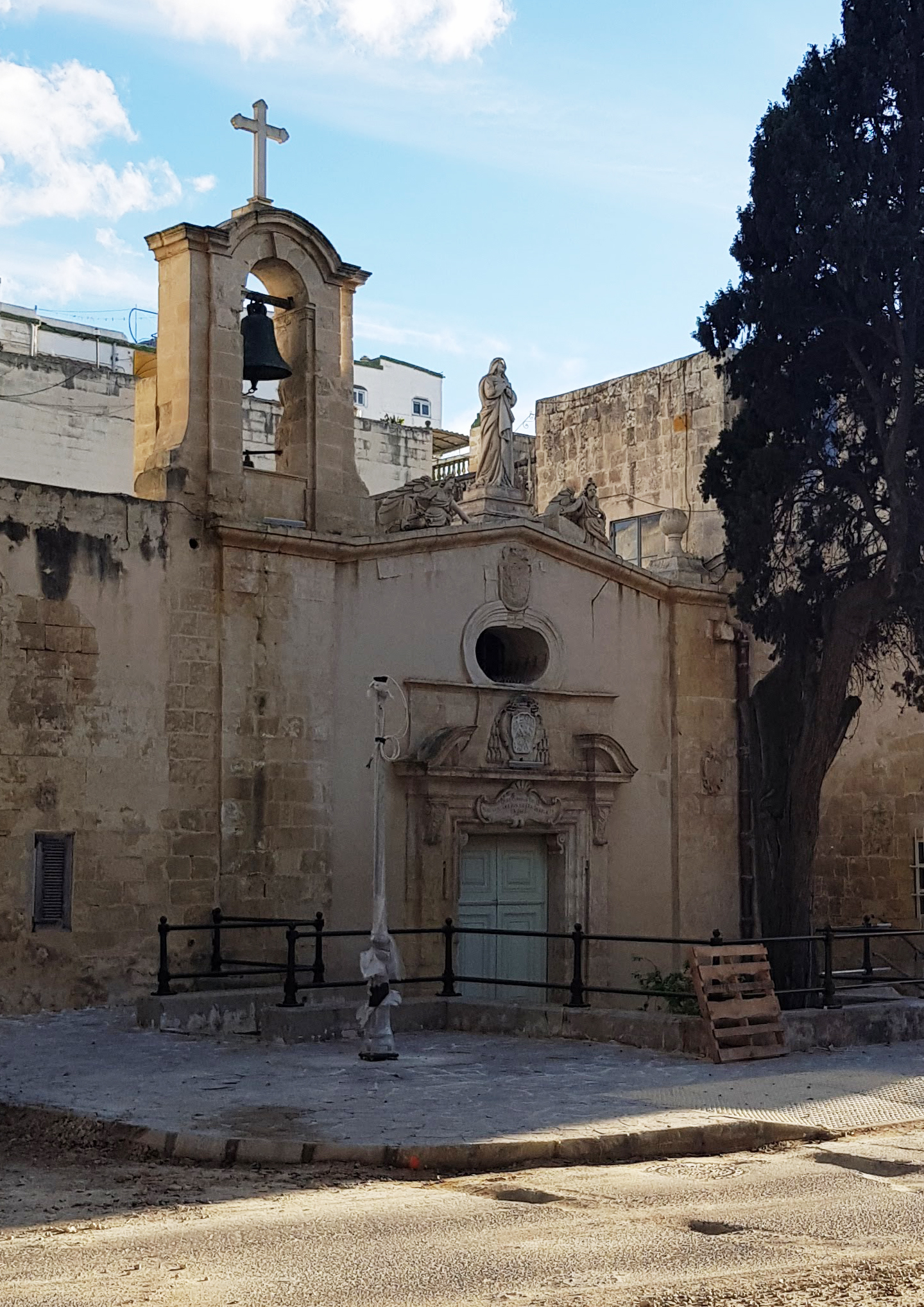
- The church's façade in 2018
- Church of Our Lady of Sorrows
- 35°53′27.5″N 14°29′48.4″E
- Location: Pietà, Malta
- Denomination: Roman Catholic
- Religious order: Augustinians (c. 1617–1652)

History
- Status: Church
- Founded: 1592–1593 or 1612 (first chapel)
- Dedication: Our Lady of Sorrows
- Earlier dedication: Saint Roch

Architecture
- Functional status: Active
- Style: Baroque
- Years built: After 1757

Specifications
- Materials: Limestone

Administration
- Archdiocese: Malta
- Parish: Gwardamanġa (Our Lady of Fatima) (since 1968) Formerly: Valletta (St Paul's Shipwreck) (until 1844) Floriana (St Publius) (1844–1867) Msida (St Joseph) (1867–1967) Ħamrun (Immaculate Conception) (1968)

The Church of Our Lady of Sorrows (Maltese: Knisja tal-Madonna tad-Duluri) is a Roman Catholic church in Pietà, Malta. It was established in the late 16th or early 17th century near a cemetery in which victims of the 1592–1593 Malta plague epidemic were buried. It was originally dedicated to Saint Roch, but after a convent was built next to it in the early 17th century it was rededicated to Our Lady of Sorrows. The church later gave its name to the town of Pietà which developed nearby, and the present building dates back to the mid-18th century when it was reconstructed. Both the church and the convent are currently in the hands of a Catholic youth ministry.

== History ==
=== First church ===
The 1592–1593 Malta plague epidemic was a severe plague outbreak which killed thousands of people in Malta. At the time, it was standard practice to bury the deceased within churches or chapels, but due to the epidemic's high death toll it became necessary to establish a new cemetery. This was located on a plot of land outside the city of Valletta, and a chapel dedicated to the patron saint of the plague-stricken Saint Roch was built nearby. Some sources state that the chapel was built in 1592–1593 while others state that it was constructed in 1612.

In around 1617, a small Augustinian convent was constructed near the chapel. Devotion to St Roch was closely related to devotion to Our Lady of Sorrows, and in the early 17th century the church's dedication was changed from the former to the latter. The church was called Santa Maria a Mare or La Pietà in Italian. Its surroundings became known as tal-Pietà, and when a town later developed in the area it retained the name of Pietà.

The Augustinian convent closed down in 1652 after Pope Innocent X had ordered the closure of small convents, and on 15 October 1652 the Bishop of Malta appointed a diocesan priest to take care of the church. Bishop Joaquín Canaves granted the church the benefit of di libera collazione in 1714. The church fell under the jurisdiction of the parish of St Paul's Shipwreck of Valletta, and in 1723 Bishop Gaspare Gori-Mancini granted it the status of vice-parish after the population of the Pietà area had grown to a few hundred people. This status was lost in 1740 and the church of St Publius in Floriana became vice-parish instead of it. By the mid-18th century, the church was poorly maintained and it was in danger of collapsing.

=== Present church ===
Cleric Giuseppe Spiteri requested permission from Bishop Paul Alphéran de Bussan to rebuild the church of Our Lady of Sorrows, and the request was accepted on 12 October 1757. The knight Wolfgang Philip von Guttenberg was a major benefactor for the church, and the new building featured a commemorative inscription and the von Guttenberg coat of arms.

Prior to the Rising of the Priests in 1775, ringleader Gaetano Mannarino and other conspirators met in the church's sacristy to plan the rebellion. During the French occupation of Malta of 1798, some of the coats of arms on the church and the convent were defaced. The church fell under the jurisdiction of the parish of St Publius of Floriana in 1844, and later that of St Joseph of Msida in 1867.

Saint George Preca, who founded the Society of Christian Doctrine, used to teach within the church in the early 20th century. On 11 June 1940, the church was used to temporarily accommodate about 15 refugees from bombed-out houses after one of the first World War II aerial bombardments of Malta. The church briefly fell under the jurisdiction of the parish of the Immaculate Conception of Ħamrun, and since 1968 it has formed part of the parish of Our Lady of Fatima of Gwardamanġa.

The church was restored in the 1960s and 1970s. It was given to the Franciscan Sisters of the Sacred Heart by Archbishop Mikiel Gonzi in 1974, but they later left Pietà. The church is prone to flooding due to its location, and it was in a poor state by the late 1990s. Conservation and restoration works were carried out by the Ministry of Resources and Infrastructure in 2000–2001.

In 2005, the church and convent were given to the Youth Fellowship community by Archbishop Joseph Mercieca. The convent is now used as a pastoral centre and for spiritual retreats. The church's façade has been restored but its interior has deteriorated, and in 2018 the Pietà Local Council stated that there are plans for further restoration. The area around the chapel has been embellished in a project funded by the Planning Authority in 2018.

The church building is listed on the National Inventory of the Cultural Property of the Maltese Islands.

== Architecture ==
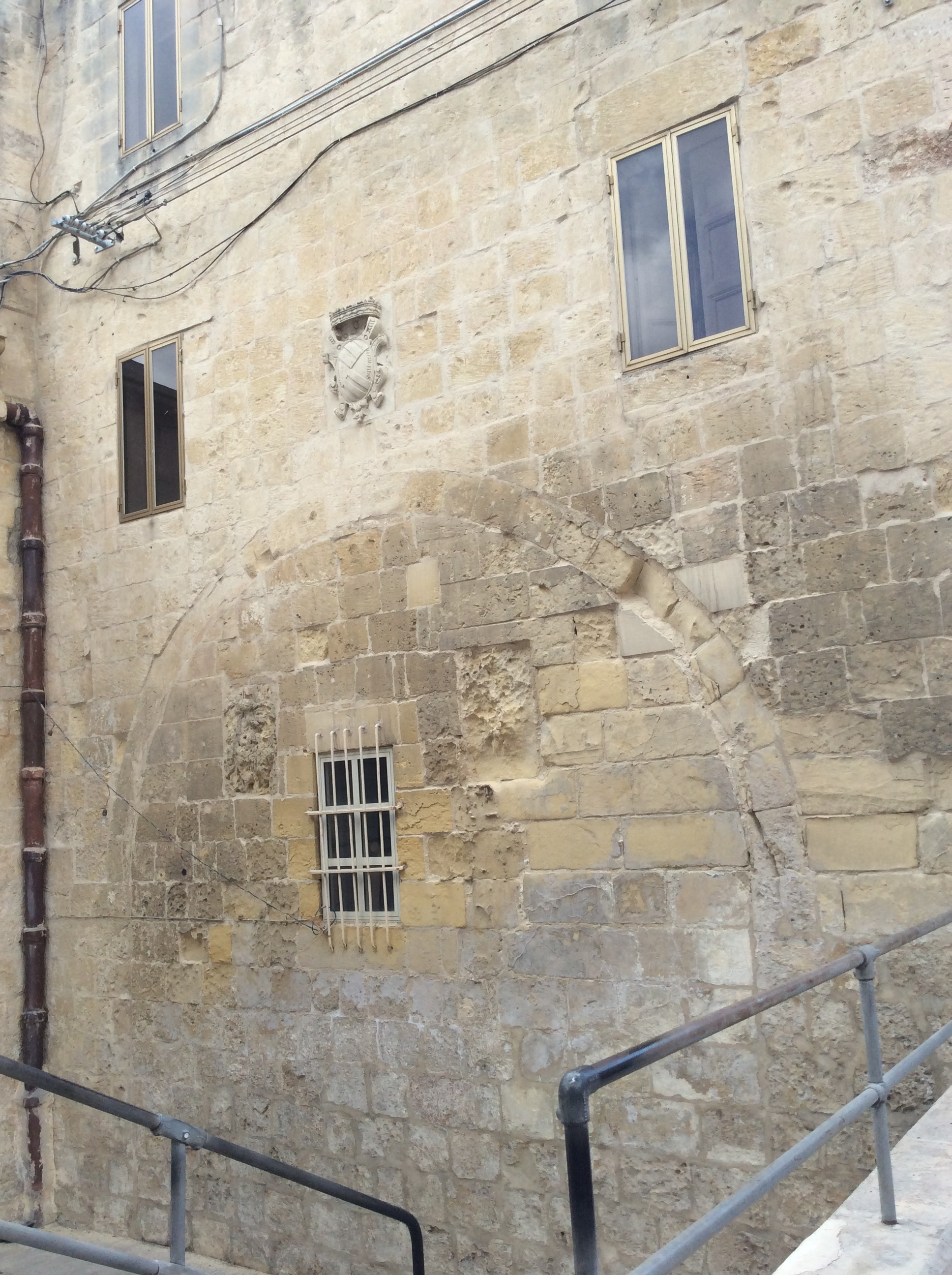
The convent wall with the coat of arms of González de Mendoza (top) and two defaced coats of arms (bottom), one of which was von Guttenberg's

The small church has a simple design and its façade has some Baroque elements. It has a large rectangular doorway framed by mouldings and topped by a Latin inscription and a corbelled cornice. The façade also features a coat of arms of Paul Alphéran de Bussan and a small window which allows light to enter the church. A large pilaster is located on either side of the doorway, and one contains an unidentified coat of arms. Above the other pilaster there is a large bell-cot containing two bells. The façade is topped by a statue of the Virgin Mary which is flanked by statues of reclining angels. Internally, the church has a main altar and four side chapels with their own altars. Three of these are dedicated to Our Lady of Loreto, Saint Roch and Our Lady of Graces.

A convent is located adjacent to the church, and the buildings are linked through the latter's sacristy. One of the convent's walls contains a coat of arms attributed to the knight Pedro González de Mendoza along with the remains of two defaced coats of arms. One of these was the emblem of von Guttenberg and the other is unidentifiable.

== Artworks ==
The church's altarpiece depicts the Virgin Mary holding the dead body of Jesus (a depiction known as a pietà), and it was painted by Gioacchino Loretta, a follower of Mattia Preti. The chapel of Our Lady of Loreto contains an altarpiece which depicts Mary with John the Baptist and the Blessed Gerard, painted by Bartolomeo Garagona in 1613. The chapel of St Roch has a painting of the Immaculate Conception with St Joseph and St Charles Borromeo which was commissioned by the Testaferrata family in the early 18th century, and its painter is unknown although it is sometimes attributed to Carlo Zimech. The chapel of Our Lady of Graces contains a painting of Mary with baby Jesus along with John the Baptist and the saints Nicholas of Tolentino and Francis which was painted in the early 17th century. These paintings were restored by Pierre Bugeja at the behest of the Pietà Local Council in 2015.

The chapel of Our Lady of Graces also contains a number of ex-voto paintings. The church's fourth chapel contains a crucifix which is said to be miraculous, and the church contains two statues of Our Lady of Sorrows and a statue of St Joseph. The older statue of Our Lady dates back to the 18th century, while the later one was sculpted by Michael Camilleri Cauchi. A wooden relief depicting John the Baptist which was commissioned by von Guttenberg is also found within the church, and there is also a reliquary containing a nail which is said to have been touched by a Holy Nail.
