= Carlo Zimech =

Maltese priest and painter (1696–1766)

Don Carlo Zimech
- Karlu Zimech
- Born: 1696; Żebbuġ, Hospitaller Malta
- Died: 22 June 1766 (aged 69–70); Nadur, Gozo, Hospitaller Malta
- Resting place: Basilica of St Peter and St Paul, Nadur; 36°2′15.6″N 14°17′39.1″E
- Occupation: Priest · Painter

Don Carlo Zimech (Maltese: Dun Karlu Zimech, 1696 – 22 June 1766) was a Maltese priest and painter. He was born within a well-off family in Żebbuġ on mainland Malta. In his later life, he retired to Nadur, Gozo, possibly because of health problems. He died in his residence on 22 June 1766, and was buried in the Nadur parish church.

Paintings attributed to Zimech include:

- The Annunciation, at the sacristy of the Balzan parish church
- The Immaculate Conception (1738), old altarpiece of the Cospicua parish church
- Our Lady of the Holy Rosary, at the Parish Church of St George, Qormi
- The Immaculate Conception, The martyrdom of St Paul (1750), The martyrdom of St Peter (1750) and The Four Evangelists, at the Nadur parish church
- San Carlo, at the Church of Our Lady of Sorrows, Pietà – this is signed with his initials DCZ

Zimech is sometimes also credited with The Nativity of Our Lady (1744), the altarpiece of the Xagħra parish church. However, this is disputed and its artist and date of execution are uncertain. It seems to have been originally been located somewhere in Malta (possibly Senglea) and it was transferred to Xagħra in 1744–51. Zimech might have modified the painting to fit in its new location.

Some of Zimech's work has been erroneously attributed to the architect and poet Carlo Gimach due to the similarity of their names. Gimach lived in Portugal and Rome during Zimech's lifespan, and there is no evidence that he was a painter.

A street in Nadur is named after him, Triq Dun Karlu Zimech (Don Carlo Zimech Street).
