= Gaetano Mannarino =

Maltese Roman Catholic priest

Don Gaetano Mannarino (Maltese: Dun Gejtanu Mannarino; 1733–1814) was a Maltese Roman Catholic priest who led an armed uprising against the Knights Hospitaller in September 1775. The rebellion was suppressed, and Mannarino was imprisoned for over two decades before being released during the French occupation of Malta in 1798.

== Early life ==
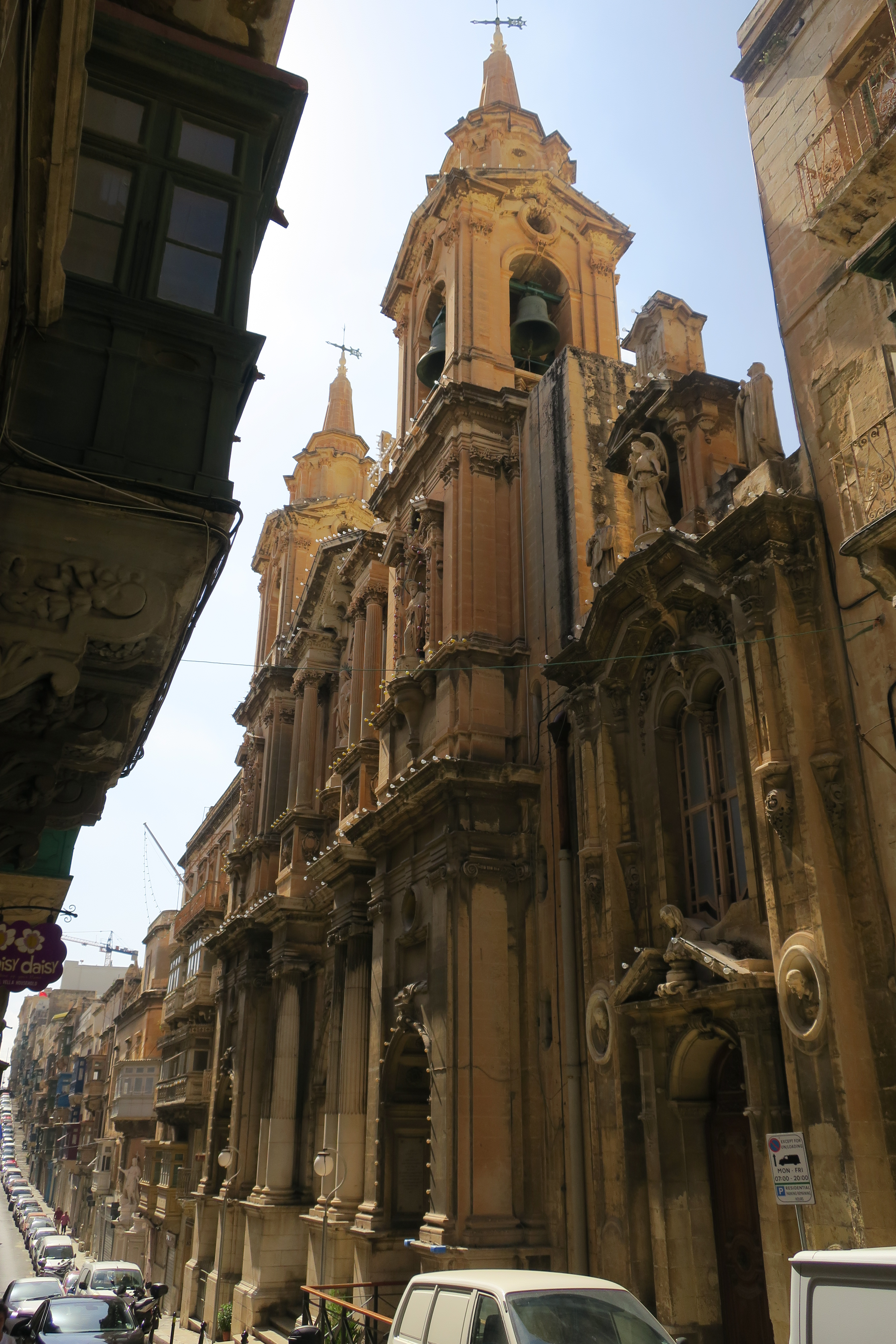
The Parish Church of St Paul's Shipwreck in Valletta, where Mannarino was baptised and later preached, as photographed in 2016

Mannarino was born in Valletta in 1733 and was baptised at the parish church of St Paul's Shipwreck. (Note: One source states that Mannarino was born on 29 August 1733 while another gives his birth date as 2 September 1733 and states that he was baptised on the same day; the baptism date is known from records of the parish church of St Paul's Shipwreck. Other sources state that he was born on 1 December 1722, but the latter is incorrect since it contradicts church records, including records from 1767 which state that he was 34 years old at that point, supporting the 1733 date.) He was the second son of the merchant Giuseppe Mannarino and his wife Giovanna née Schembri Pace; the family was sufficiently wealthy and they owned at least one female slave.

Mannarino studied at the Floriana seminary and was ordained a Catholic priest on 23 September 1758. His older brother Paolo and his younger brother Antonio also became priests, while another brother Gio. Battista was a cleric. Mannarino spent some time in Rome, where he participated in Jesuit missions in the city's outskirts and gained a reputation as a preacher. Upon his return to Malta, he was given permission to preach at the parish church of St Paul's Shipwreck. He preached in the Maltese language, and contemporaries described him as "a good priest but hard headed and obstinate ... some of his opinions being most strange."

After his father's death, Mannarino was appointed as curator of his assets, and in 1767 he was living at his uncle's residence in Valletta. On 31 December 1772, after he had recovered from a severe illness, Mannarino organised a thanksgiving procession towards the church of St Publius in Floriana and distributed food to beggars; this drew a large crowd and it alarmed the Hospitaller authorities, who closed the city gates and raised the alarm in anticipation of a riot.

The magistracy of Hospitaller Grand Master Francisco Ximénez de Tejada which began in January 1773 was characterised by economic mismanagement, food shortages and disputes between the Hospitallers and the clergy which led to the recall of Bishop Giovanni Carmine Pellerano to Rome in April 1775. Mannarino became a critic of Ximénez and of the Hospitallers' rule over Malta, and on one occasion he was physically assaulted by a knight named Galan. These tensions eventually led to an armed uprising under Mannarino's leadership in 1775.

== Uprising of 1775 ==
Mannarino reportedly met with other conspirators in the sacristy of the Church of Our Lady of Sorrows in Pietà. On 8 September 1775 – the feast day of the Nativity of Mary and the anniversary of a 1565 siege – Mannarino led a group of rebels to Fort Saint Elmo in Valletta, where they gained access with the assistance of corporal Antonio Antonurso of the Magistral Regiment. The rebels successfully took control of the fort, while a separate group of rebels simultaneously took control of Saint James Cavalier at the opposite end of the city; by the morning of 9 September the rebels had lowered the Order's flags from the two fortresses and raised their own flags – either white and red standards or banners of Saint Paul – in their stead. Mannarino's rebels in St. Elmo fired a cannon shot and this was answered by another shot from the cavalier, alerting the city to the insurrection.

The takeover of the fort and cavalier were meant to instigate a popular uprising among the Maltese peasantry and nobility, but this failed to materialise. The Hospitallers opened negotiations with the rebels, and the latter's demands consisted of an amnesty for themselves, safeguarding of Maltese privileges, and a reduction in the price of grain. The Hospitallers quickly retook the cavalier by force, while negotiations continued with the remaining rebels led by Mannarino in the fort. At one point the rebels threatened to blow up the fort's gunpowder magazine, but they fell into disarray after members of the fort's garrison who they had imprisoned fought back and killed one priest. Mannarino and the remaining rebels surrendered by 11 September after it became clear that there would be no general uprising, and they were detained by the Hospitallers.

== Imprisonment, release, and later life ==
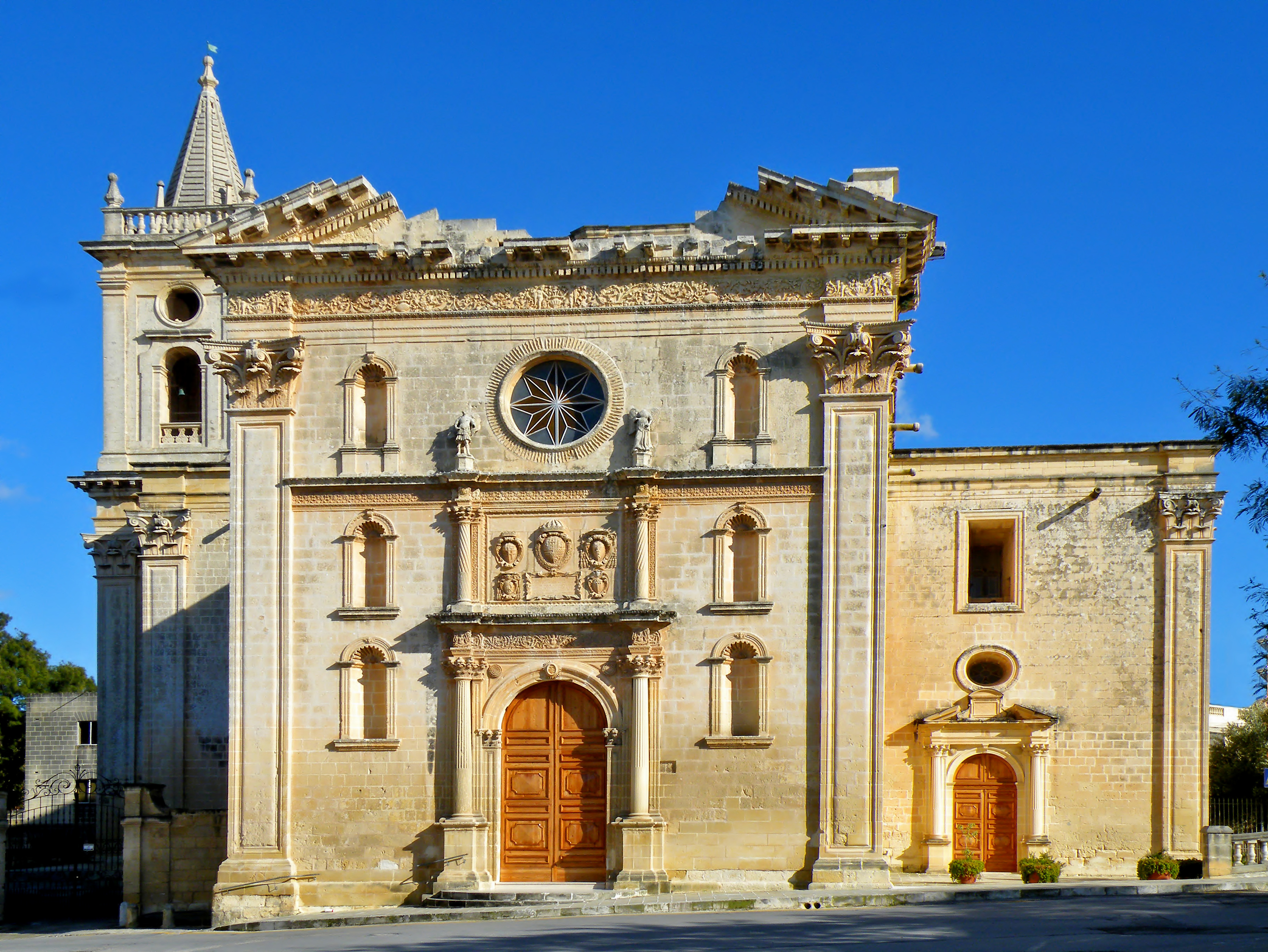
The Parish Church of St Mary in Birkirkara, where Mannarino is buried, as photographed in 2009

Gaetano Mannarino and his brothers Antonio and Gio. Battista, who had also been involved in the revolt, remained imprisoned inside Fort Saint Elmo. Mannarino engraved his name on one of the fort's walls while he was imprisoned; this graffito has survived and it was rediscovered during restoration works in the 21st century. At some point, Mannarino is said to have been imprisoned in Fort Manoel, where he was kept under close guard after an escape attempt. When Hospitaller rule in Malta ended with a French invasion on 12 June 1798, Mannarino was released by the French authorities and he was welcomed by Napoleon as a martyr of liberty.

Mannarino subsequently lived in a house in Cospicua. After a Maltese uprising against the French occupation broke out in September 1798, the French government sent Mannarino as an emissary to the insurgents, but the latter rejected him and he lived the rest of his life in relative obscurity. Mannarino's will and testament was prepared by the notary Antonio Delicata in Għaxaq on 8 May 1799, and this has been preserved at the Notarial Archives. He lived in Senglea during the early 19th century, and he later retired to a small house in the village of St. Julian's. He died in April 1814, and was buried within the old church of St Mary in Birkirkara. (Note: Although most sources state that Mannarino died on 7 April 1814 in St. Julian's, at least one 19th century source claims that he died on 17 April 1814 in Birkirkara. At the time, St. Julian's formed part of the parish of Birkirkara.)

== Legacy ==
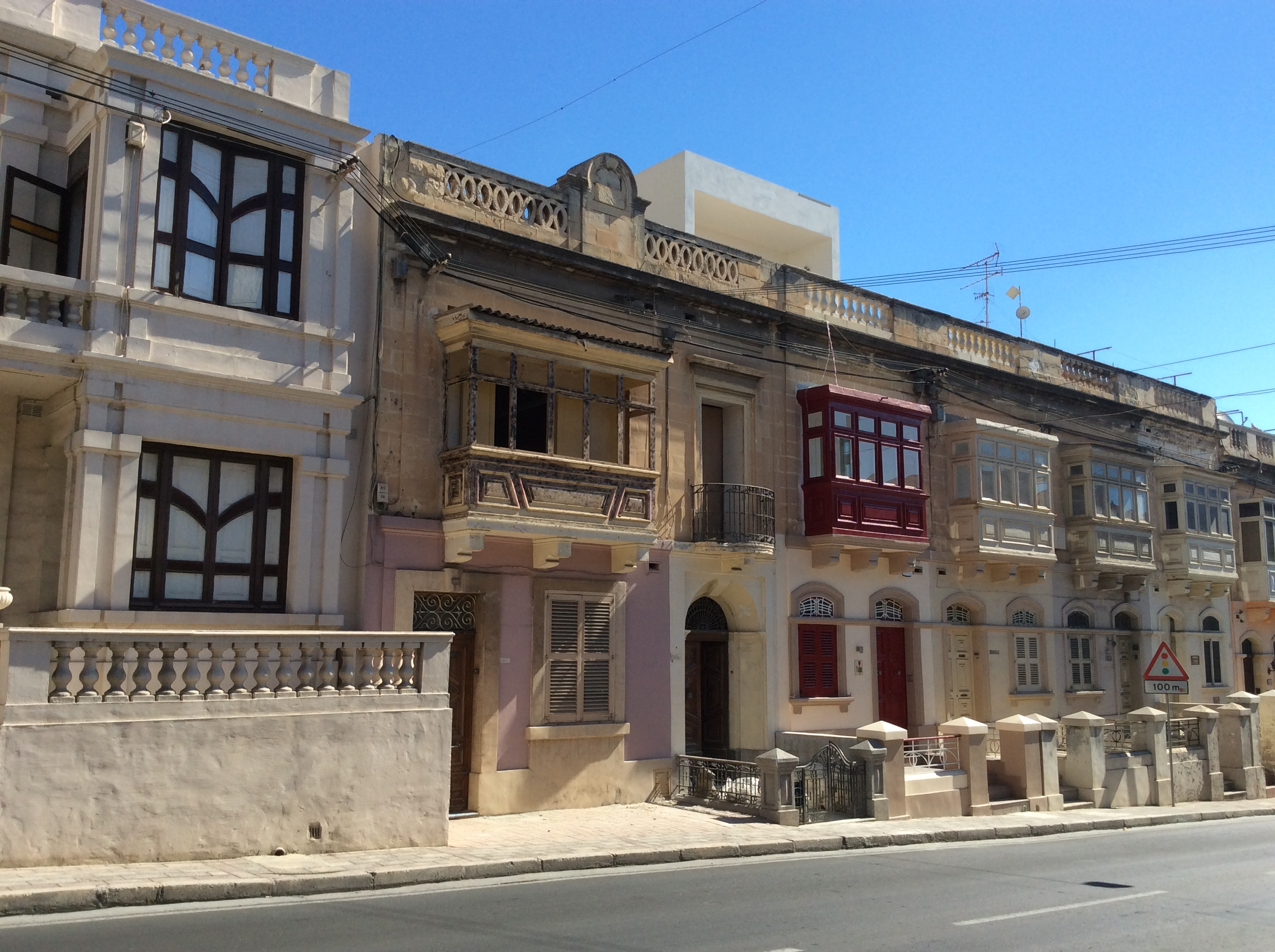
Triq Dun Gejtanu Mannarino, one of Birkirkara's main roads which is named after Mannarino, as photographed in 2017

A tablet in Mannarino's memory was installed within the Birkirkara church on 1 November 1931. A main road in Birkirkara is also named after him.
