= Tommaso Mannarino =

Italian Monk

Tommaso Mannarino (17th-century) was an Italian Benedictine monk and scholar.

He was born in Palermo. In 1656, he was named bishop of Fondi. Known for his erudition, he was employed by Emperor Ferdinand II to establish an academy of Sciences in Salzburg, where he also was given a professorship. He served as bishop for 16 years and was rewarded with position as chancellor and Palatine Count. Among his works were Commentaria in summam divi Thomae and various elegies (Orazioni) in Latin.
