= Emmanuel de Rohan-Polduc =

Grand Master of the Knights Hospitaller

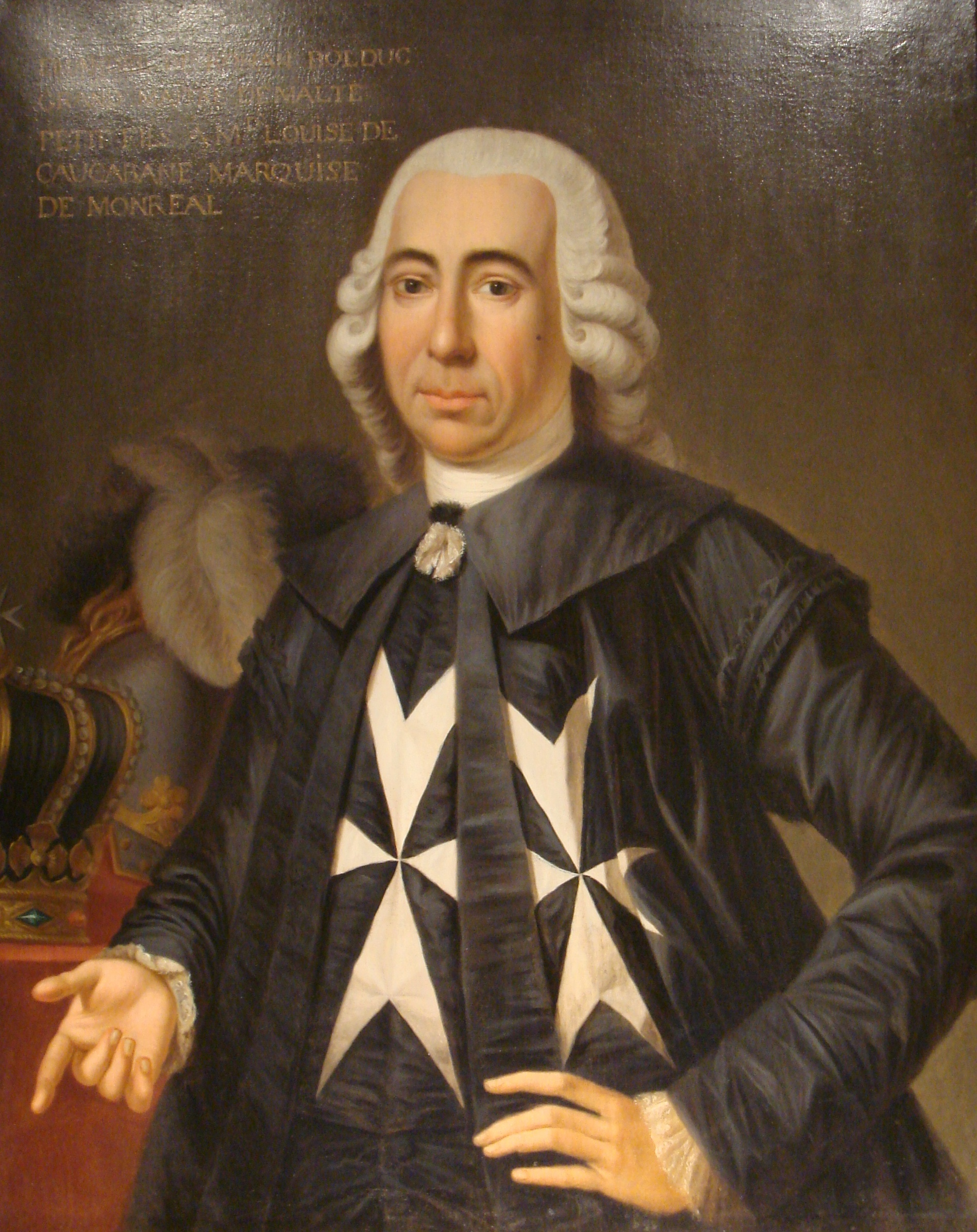

Grand Master of the Order of Saint John
- In office 12 November 1775 – 14 July 1797
- Preceded by: Francisco Ximénez de Tejada
- Succeeded by: Ferdinand von Hompesch zu Bolheim

Personal details
- Born: 18 April 1725 La Mancha, Spain
- Died: 14 July 1797 (aged 72) Valletta, Hospitaller Malta
- Resting place: St. John's Co-Cathedral, Valletta

Military service
- Allegiance: (Sovereign Military Order of Malta) Order of Saint John

Fra' Emmanuel Marie des Neiges de Rohan-Polduc (18 April 1725, in La Mancha, Spain – 14 July 1797, in Valletta, Malta) was a member of the Poulduc branch of the wealthy and influential House of Rohan of France, and Prince and 70th Grand Master of the Order of St. John from 1775 to 1797.

== Biography ==
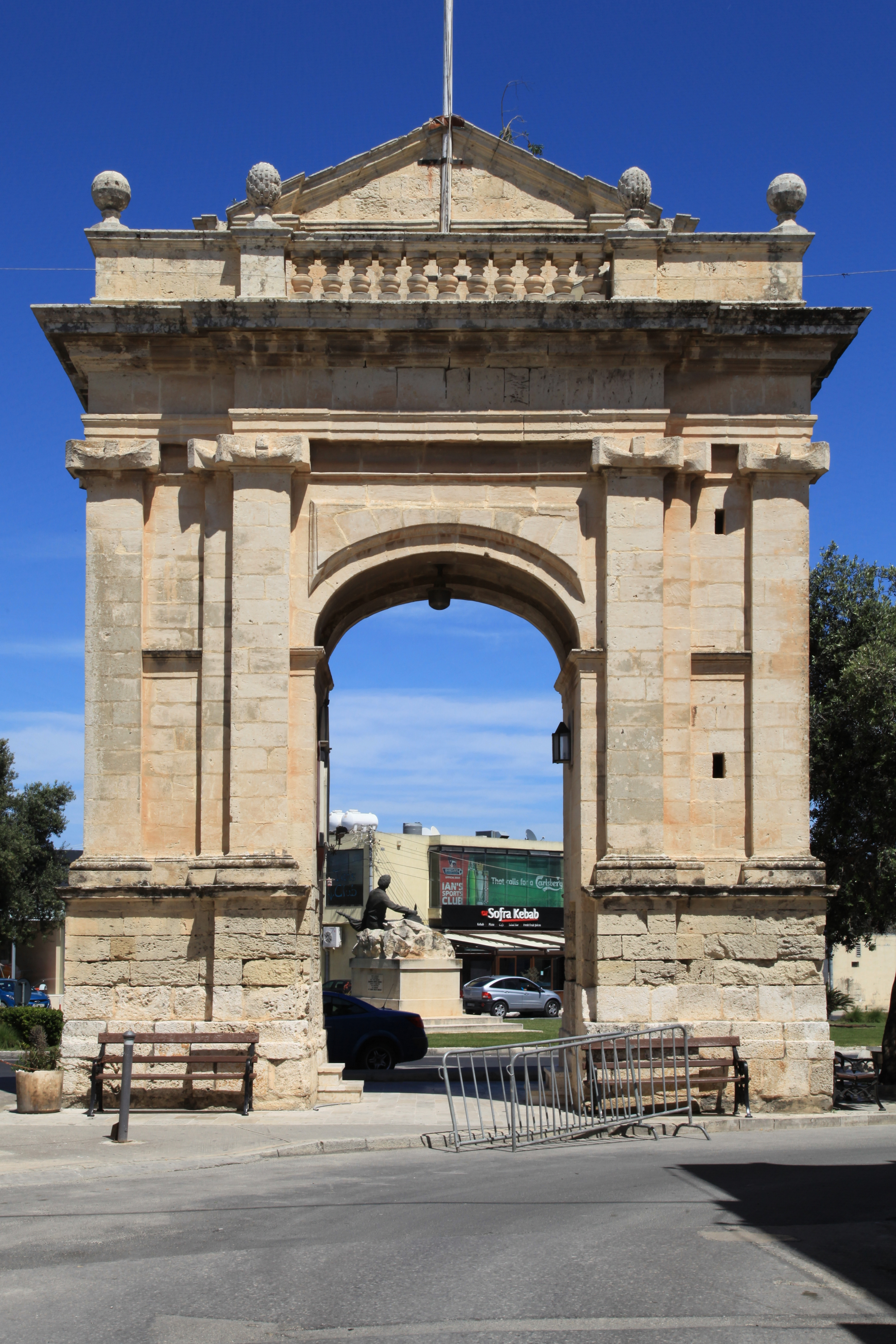
De Rohan Arch in Żebbuġ

Rohan was born in la Mancha, Spain on 18 April 1725. He was the son of Jean-Baptiste de Rohan, Comte du Poulduc, seigneur de Kercabus, (1691-1755) and his wife, Marie Louise de Velthoven. His father was French, but had been banished to Spain. He served King Philip V of Spain in the Walloon Guards and then his son, Philip, Duke of Parma as Master of the Horse. He was sent as ambassador of Parma to the Holy Roman Emperor Francis I.

Thanks to a papal brief, Rohan was received into the Order of St. John in the Langue of France. He was named Bailiff, and in 1755 Captain-General of the Order's Navy. Following the death in 1773 of Grand Master Manuel Pinto da Fonseca, Rohan was considered a potential successor, but Francisco Ximénez de Tejada was elected instead. Ximenes' reign was unpopular due to the Order's bankruptcy. After the death of Ximenes, Rohan was elected Grand Master on 12 November 1775. The following year he convoked a Chapter General of the Order, the first to be held since 1631. In January 1776 he re-established a chamber of commerce to regulate the islands’ cotton trade.

Rohan sought to win the respect of the people of the island of Malta, and he became a popular Grand Master. On 21 June 1777, he elevated the village of Żebbuġ to the status of city, naming it Città Rohan. The coat of arms of Żebbuġ contains the arms of the House of Rohan, in honour of the Grand Master. The De Rohan Arch commemorating this event was constructed in 1798.

Rohan compiled the Code de Rohan, a constitutional law book published in two volumes in 1782. He was also responsible for the publication of the Diritto Municipale in 1784.

Rohan instituted the Anglo-Bavarian langue, which was housed in the former Palazzo Carniero. In 1797, he established the Russian Grand Priory, which later evolved into the Russian tradition of the Knights Hospitaller.

In 1792, Rohan commissioned and partially financed the construction of Fort Tigné. St. Lucian Tower & Battery were also upgraded during Rohan's magistracy, and the complex was renamed Fort Rohan in 1795 after the Grand Master. It was rebuilt as Fort San Lucian in the 1870s, but it still retains Rohan's coat of arms on the façade.

The last few years of Rohan's magistracy were troublesome, due to the decline of the Order because of the French Revolution. Rohan suffered a stroke in 1792, and his health began to deteriorate. He died on 14 July 1797, and was buried in St. John's Co-Cathedral in Valletta. His last words were "I, at any rate, am the last grandmaster, at least of an order illustrious and independent." Less than a year after his death, the French invaded Malta and expelled the Order from the island.

| Preceded by Francisco Ximénez de Tejada | Grand Master of the Knights Hospitaller; 1775–1797 | Succeeded by Ferdinand von Hompesch zu Bolheim |
