= Francisco Ximénez de Tejada =

Prince and Grand Master of the Order of Malta

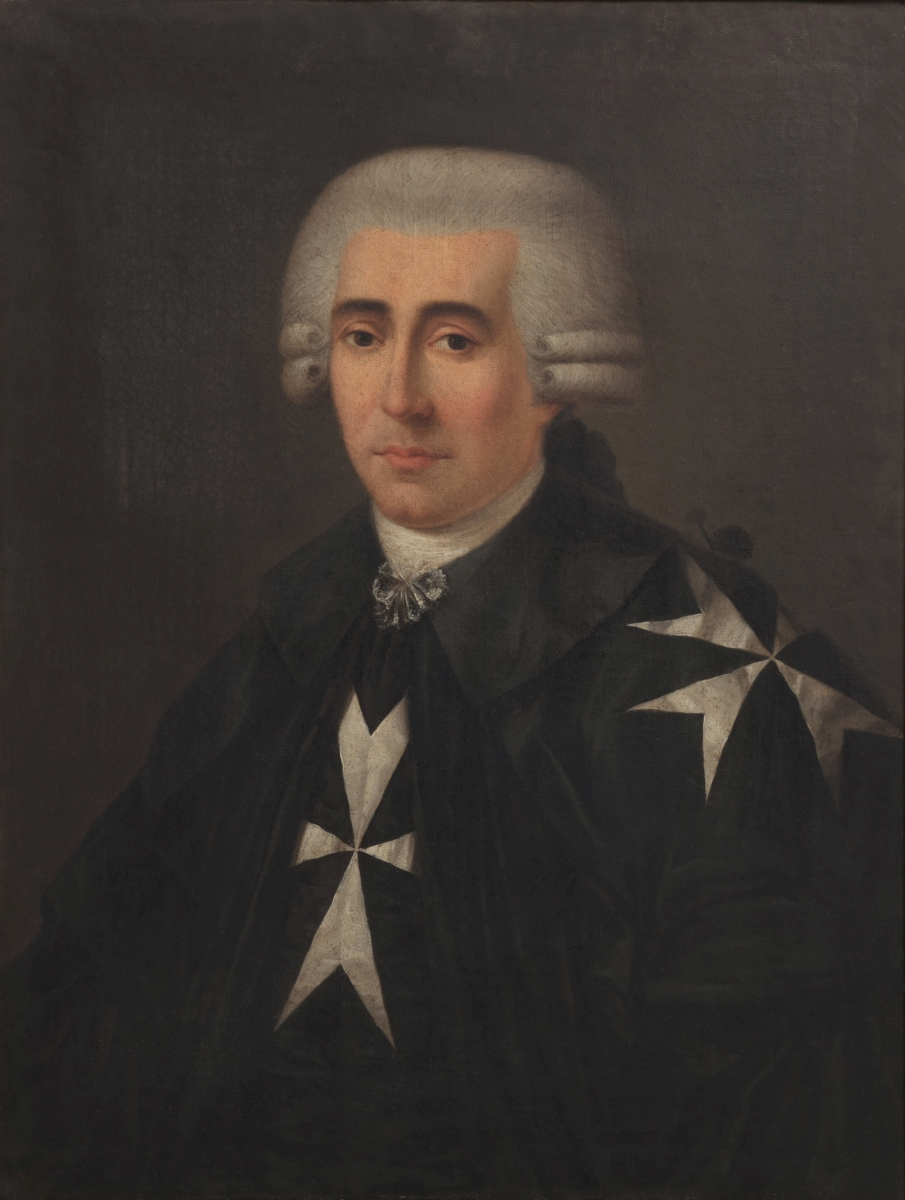

Grand Master of the Order of Saint John
- In office 28 January 1773 – 9 November 1775
- Preceded by: Manuel Pinto da Fonseca
- Succeeded by: Emmanuel de Rohan-Polduc

Personal details
- Born: 13 October 1703 Aragon (modern Spain)
- Died: 9 November 1775 (aged 72) Naples, Kingdom of Naples
- Resting place: St. John's Co-Cathedral

Military service
- Allegiance: (Sovereign Military Order of Malta) Order of Saint John

Francisco Ximénez de Tejada y Eslava (Aragonese: Francisco Ximénes de Texada i Eslava; 13 October 1703, Funes, Kingdom of Navarre − 9 November 1775, Naples) was a Spanish knight who served as the 69th Prince and Grand Master of the Order of Malta from 1773 to 1775. During his reign the Order became unpopular mainly due to bankruptcy brought by the lavish lifestyle of his predecessor Manuel Pinto da Fonseca. His reign was marked by the unsuccessful Rising of the Priests.

During the reign of Ximénez, a warehouse was added to the Salina Right Redoubt in Salina Bay, and the redoubt became known as Ximenes Redoubt due to the large escutcheon with the Grand Master's coat of arms above the doorway.

== Death ==
Ximénez died of a pulmonary infection on 9 November 1775 while he was in Naples. Unlike most other Grand Masters of the Order of Malta he had not set aside any money for his funeral. He was buried in a lead-lined wooden coffin in the crypt at Saint John's Co-Cathedral, Valletta, but his tomb remained unmarked. His remains were discovered again in 2021 when arrangements were made for Grand Master Matthew Festing to be buried in the same crypt.

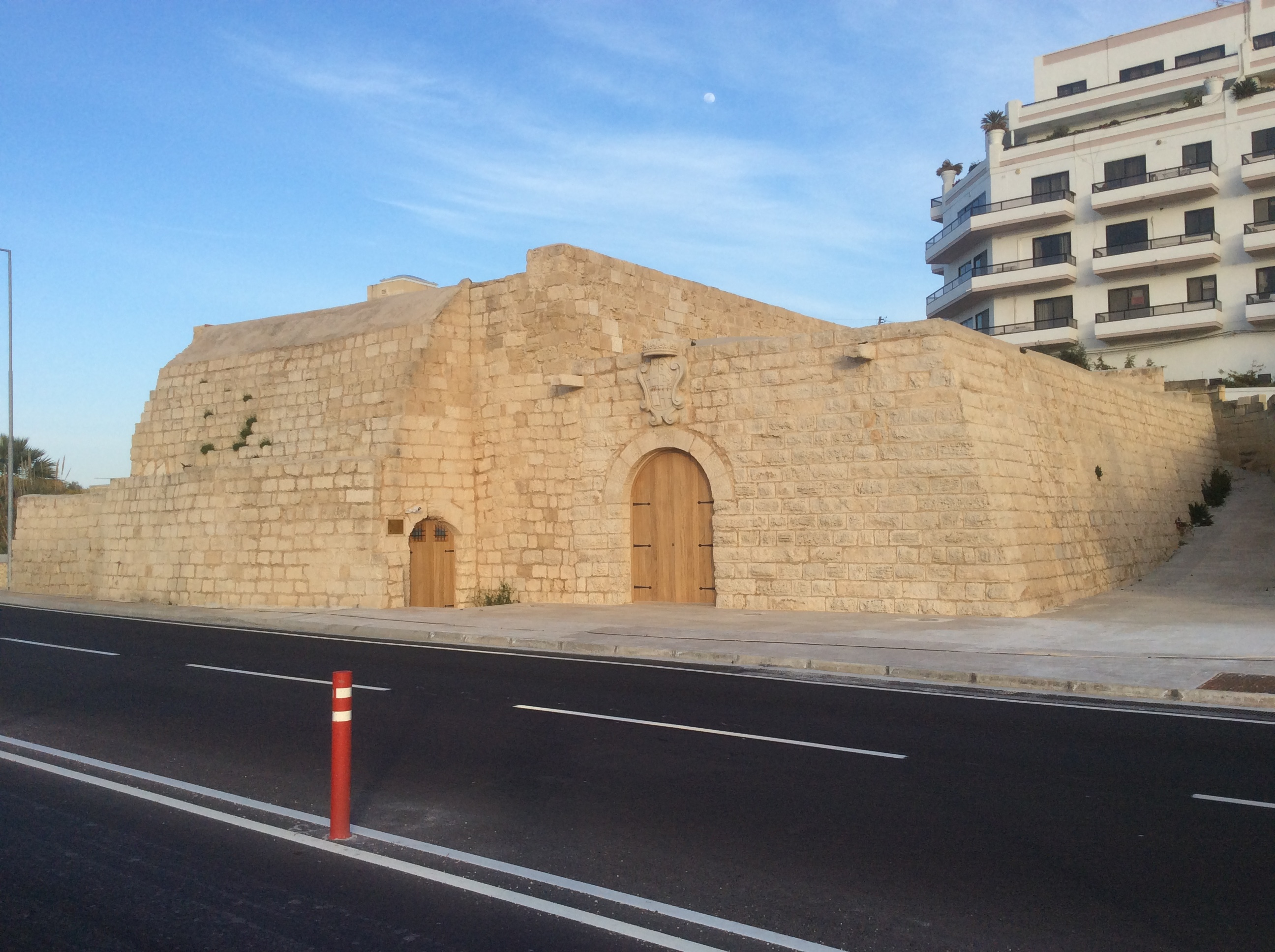
Ximenes Redoubt

Preceded by Manuel Pinto de Fonseca	Grand Master of the Knights Hospitaller; 1773–1775	Succeeded by Emmanuel de Rohan-Polduc
