= Collegiate Parish Church of St Paul's Shipwreck =

Collegiate of St Paul
- The Collegiate Matrix Parish church of Saint Paul
- Il-Knisja Kolleġġjata Arċipretali u Matriċi ta' San Pawl
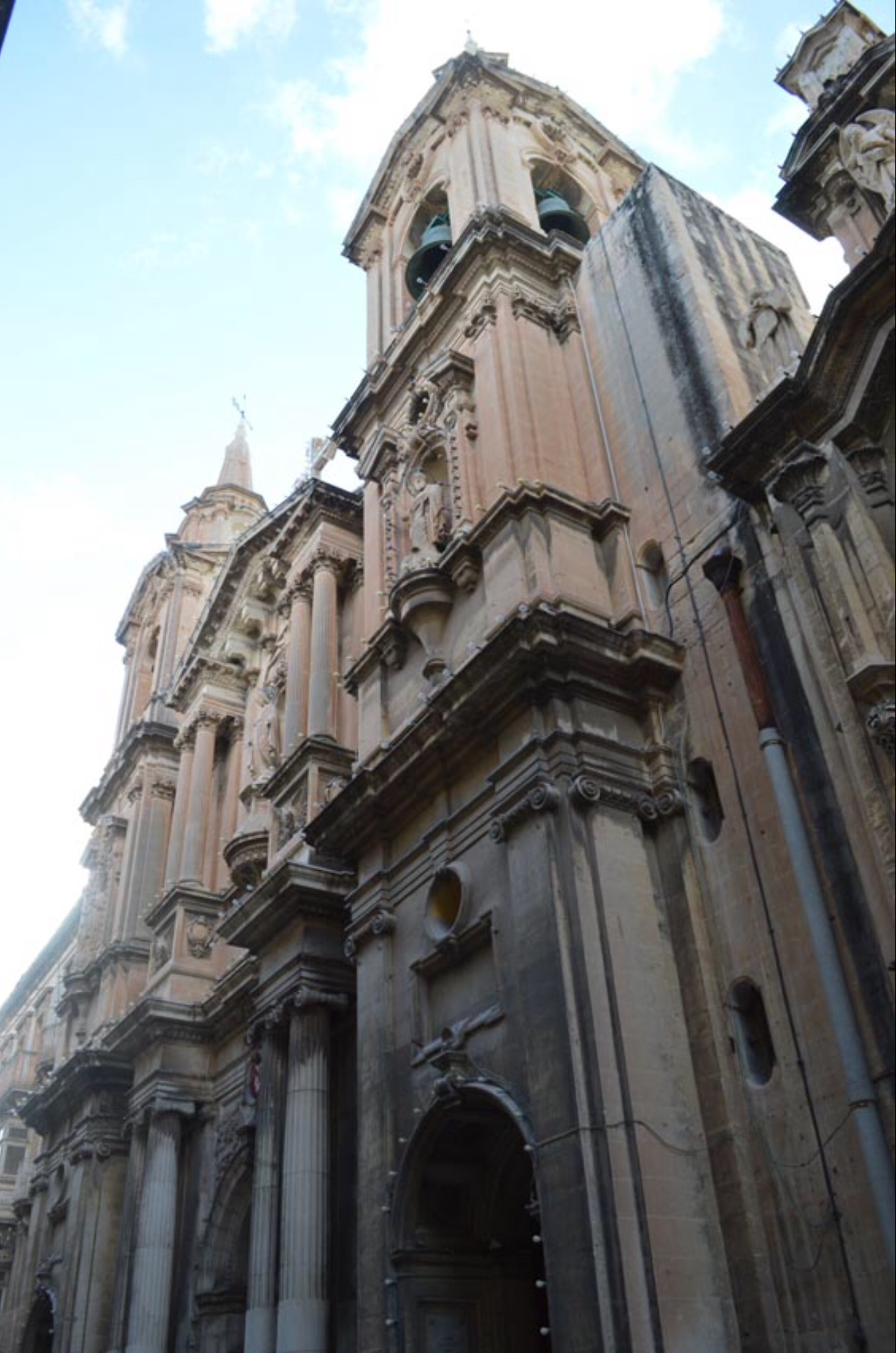
- Façade of the Church of St Paul's Shipwreck
- Collegiate of St Paul
- 35°53′51″N 14°30′50″E
- Location: Valletta, Malta
- Denomination: Roman Catholic

History
- Status: Active
- Founded: 1570
- Dedication: Saint Paul
- Dedicated: 15 May

Architecture
- Functional status: Collegiate church Parish church
- Architectural type: Church
- Style: Baroque

Administration
- Archdiocese: Malta
- Parish: Valletta

The Collegiate Parish Church of St Paul's Shipwreck, also known as simply the Church of St Paul's Shipwreck, is a Roman Catholic parish church in Valletta, Malta. It is one of Valletta's oldest churches.

== History ==
Saint Paul the Apostle is considered the spiritual father of the Maltese. His shipwreck on Malta is described in the New Testament (Acts 28, 1). St. Luke wrote, "we found that the island was called Melita".

The church traces its origins to 1570s, was designed by Girolamo Cassar, and completed in December 1582. The church was ceded to the Jesuit Fathers and a new church was started in 1639. The church's facade was rebuilt in 1885 according to the design of Nicholas Zammit.

The church building is listed on the National Inventory of the Cultural Property of the Maltese Islands.

In 2024, the church building was featured in Season 28 of ABC's The Bachelor when Bachelor Joey and contestant Lexi visited the church during a date.

== Interior ==
The church hosts fine artistic works, including the magnificent altarpiece by Matteo Perez d'Aleccio, the paintings by Attilio Palombi, and Giuseppe Calì. The wooden titular statue of St Paul was carved in 1659 by Melchiorre Cafà, the brother of Lorenzo Gafà who designed the dome. The statue is paraded through the streets of Valletta on the feast day of St Paul's Shipwreck, February 10. One can also view the relic of the right wrist-bone of St Paul, and part of the column from San Paolo alle Tre Fontane, on which the saint was beheaded in Rome.

== Gallery ==
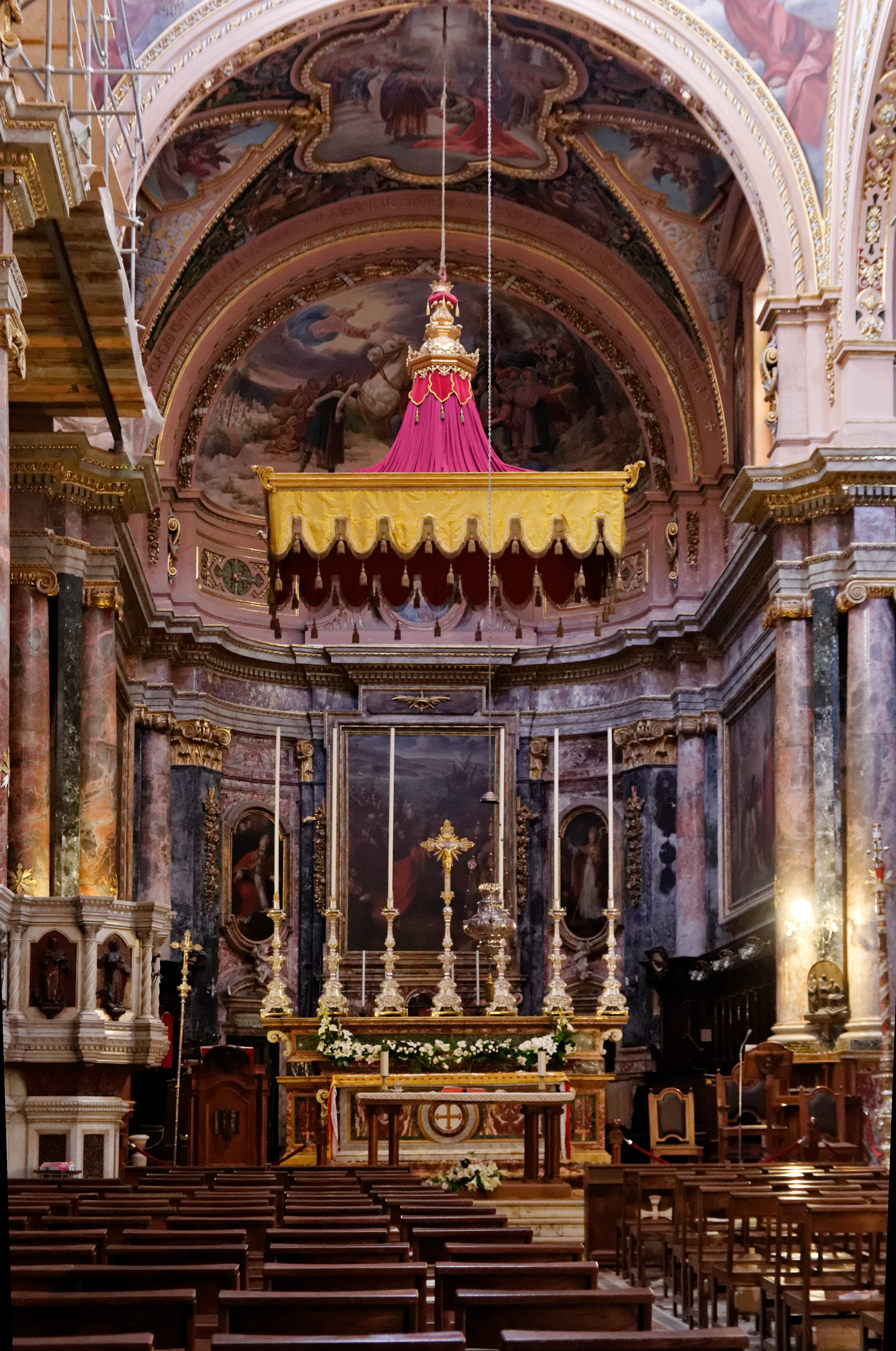
Main altar

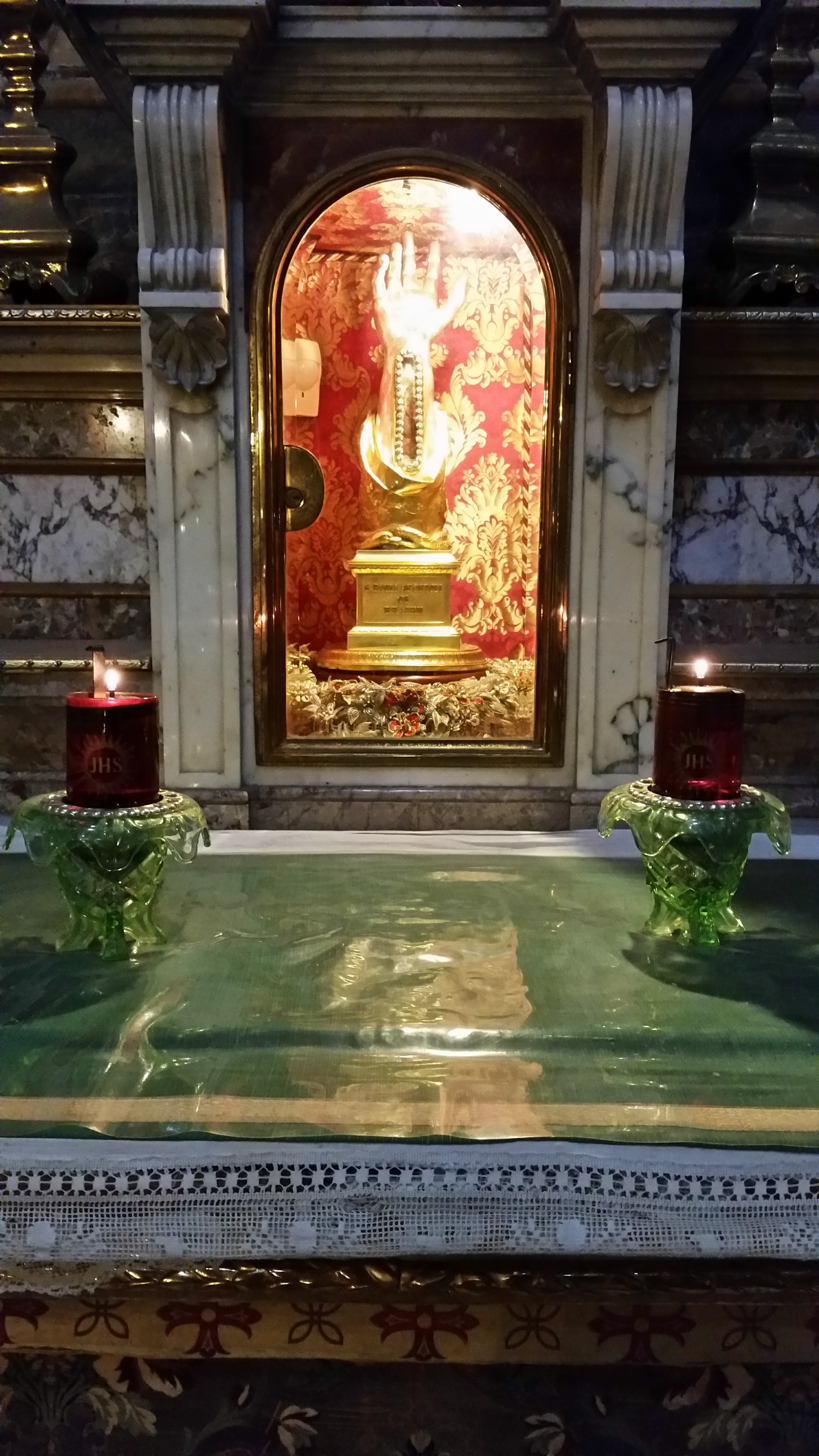
Relic of St. Paul

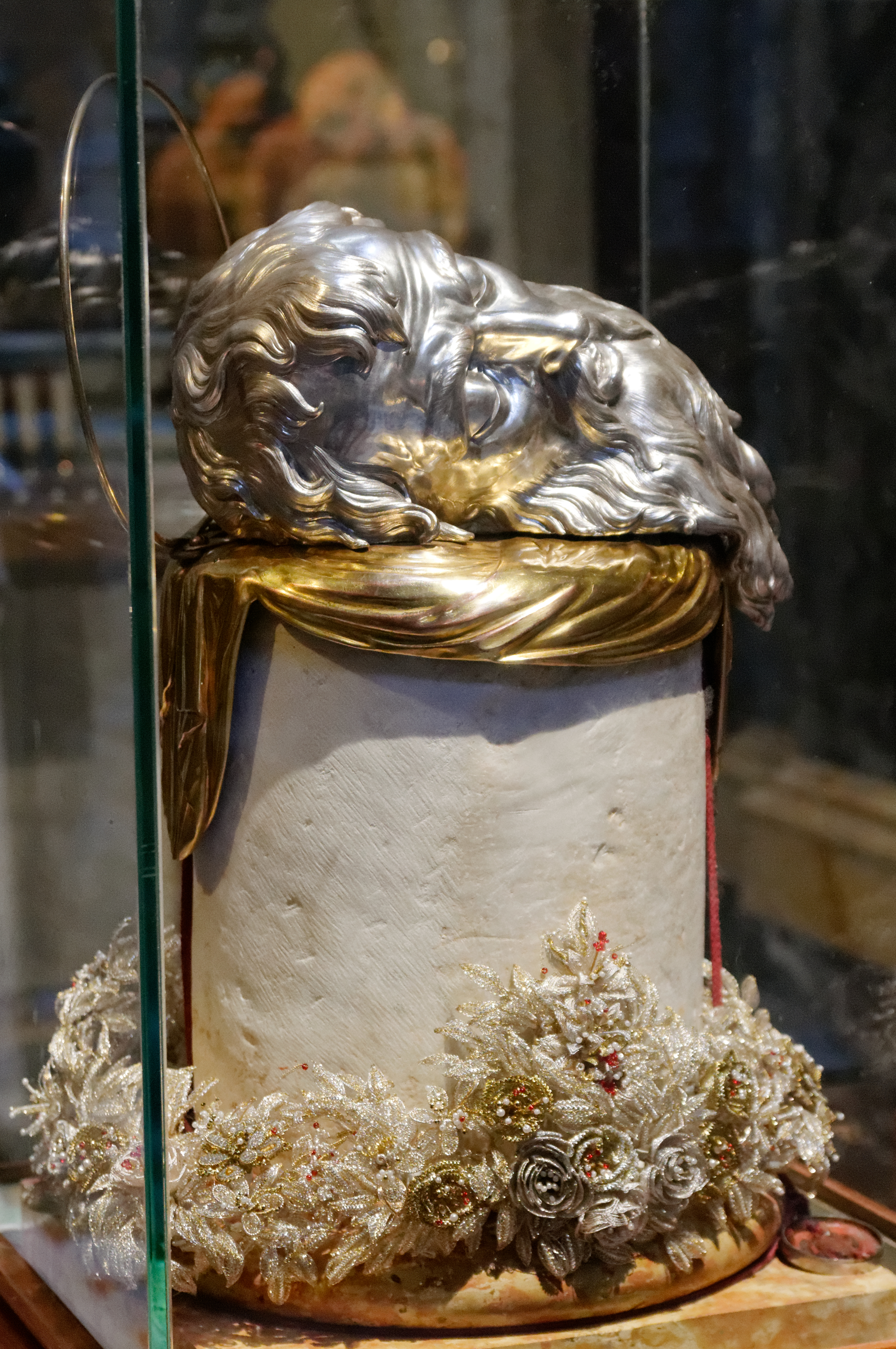
Part of the column on which the saint was beheaded in Rome

== See also ==
- Culture of Malta
- History of Malta
- List of Churches in Malta
- Religion in Malta
