= Giuseppe Bonici =

Maltese architect (1707–1779)

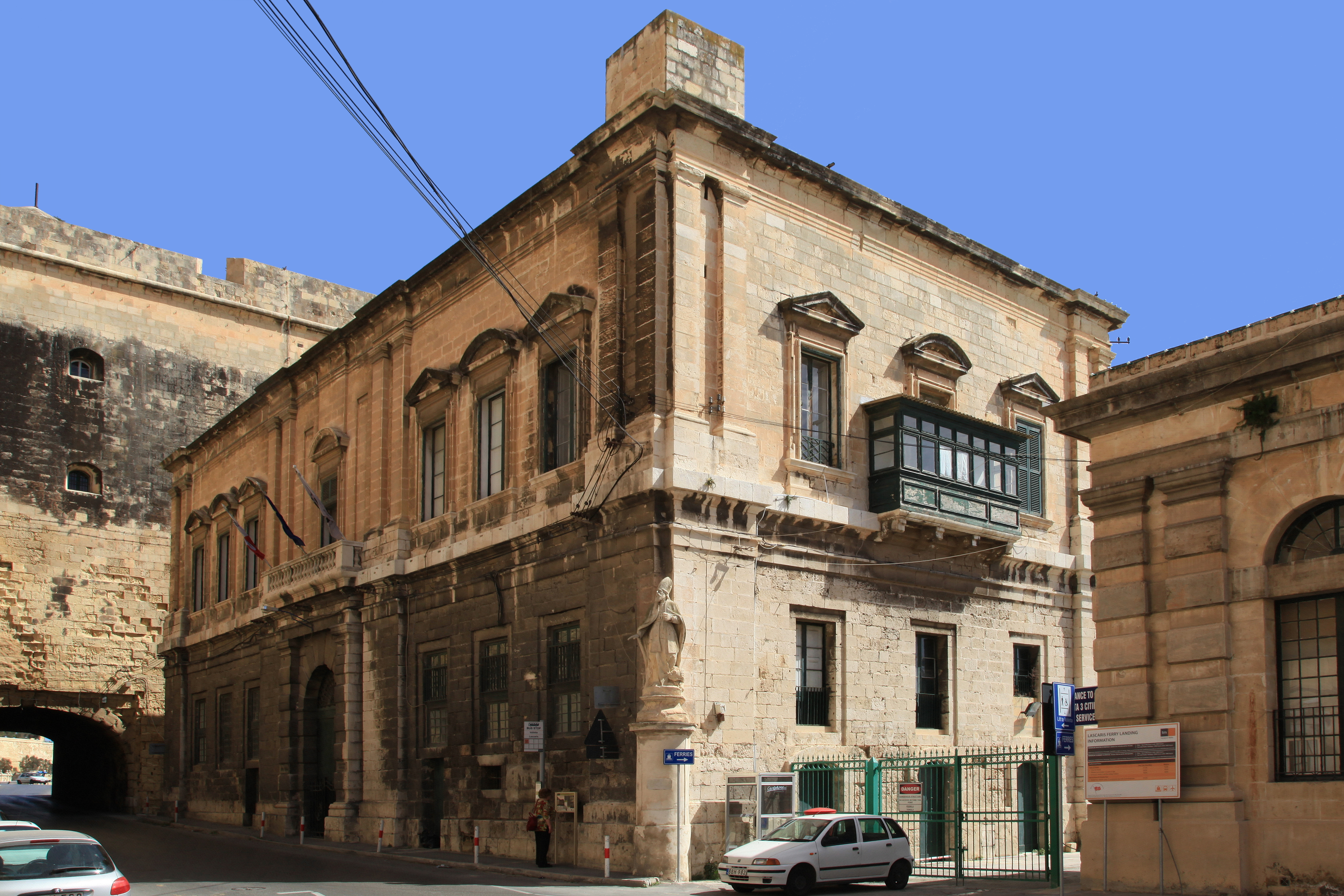
The Customs House in Valletta, Malta

Giuseppe Bonici (1707–1779) was a Maltese architect and military engineer. He held the post of Capomastro delle Opere della Religione and was the principal architect of the Order of St. John from 1761 until his death. He designed several notable buildings; his masterpiece was the Customs House in Valletta.

== Biography ==
Bonici began drawing architectural plans at a young age, and he was apprenticed to the Maltese architect Giovanni Barbara and later the French military engineer René Jacob de Tigné. He made plans for the St Publius Parish Church in Floriana in 1734, which solidified his fame as a master of religious architecture. His masterpiece is the Customs House in Valletta, which he designed in 1774. Bonici mainly designed buildings in the Baroque style, even when the style was being superseded by neoclassical architecture in the rest of Europe.

Bonici held a number of positions throughout his career, including a substitute engineer at the Commissari Domorum, an examiner of those aspiring to be land surveyors, and Capomastro delle Fortificazioni della Fondazione Cotoner. Most notably, he held the post of Capomastro delle Opere della Religione, being the principal architect of the Order of St. John, from 1761 to his death in 1779. Bonnici was also a member of the Monte della Redenzione degli Schiavi and a donat of the Order.

== List of buildings attributed to Bonnici ==
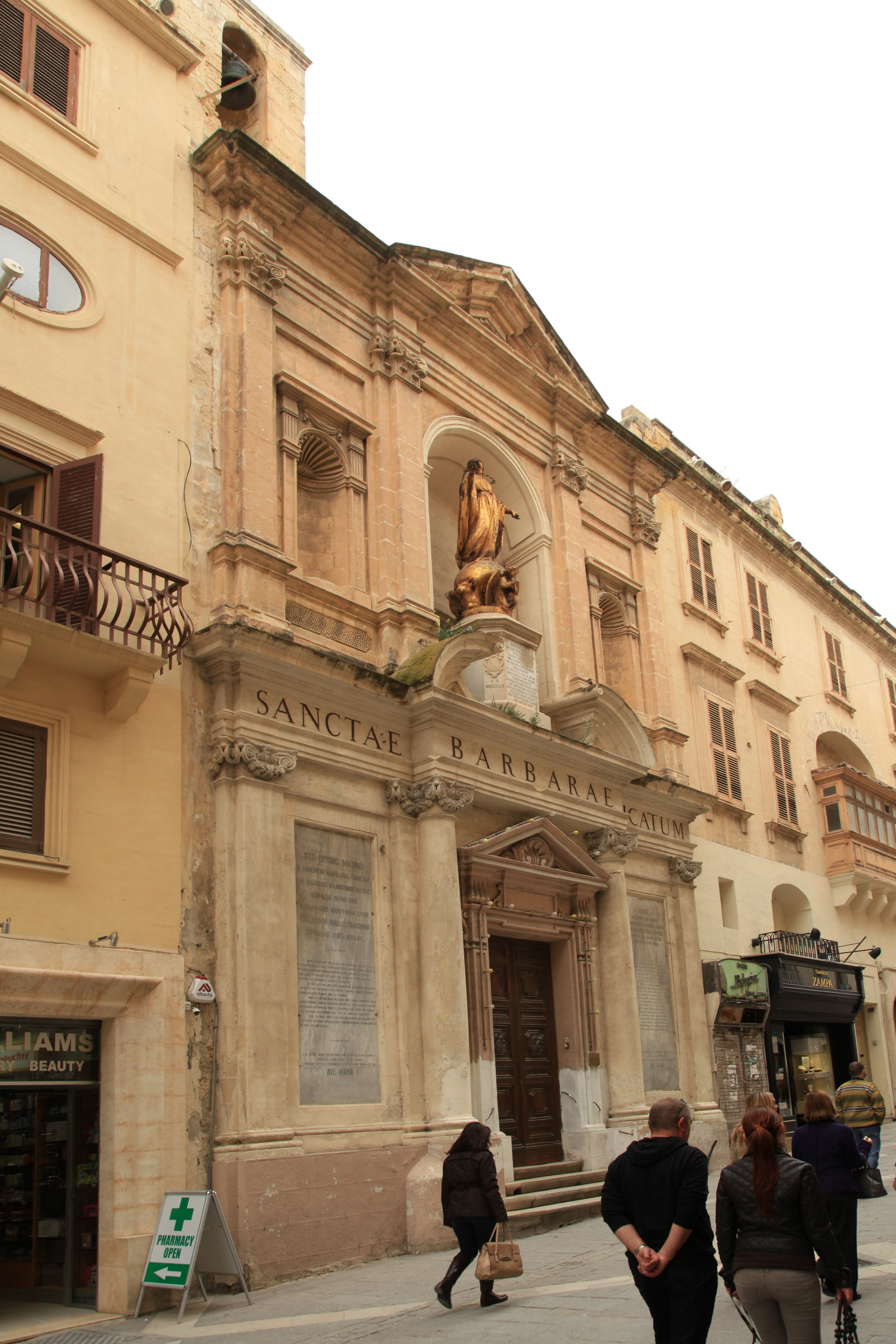
Church of St. Barbara in Valletta

The following buildings are known to have been designed by Bonnici or are attributed to him:

- Church of the Immaculate Conception, Cospicua (1730) – attributed
- St Publius Parish Church, Floriana (1734) – nave only, with other architects
- Church of St. Barbara, Valletta (1737)
- Castellania, Valletta (1758–60) – built to designs of Francesco Zerafa
- Basilica of St. Peter & St. Paul, Nadur (1760) – attributed
- Church of St. Bartholomew, Tarxien (1764) – attributed
- Church of St. Augustine, Valletta (1765) – completed by Antonio Cachia
- Customs House, Valletta (1774)
- Fountains at St George's Square, Valletta.
