= Giovanni Niccolò Muscat =

Maltese doctor of law (1735–c.1800)

- Born: 8 March 1735; Valletta, Hospitaller Malta
- Died: c. 1800; Sardinia, Kingdom of Sardinia
- Occupations: Lawyer, philosopher

Giovanni Niccolò Muscat (8 March 1735 – c. 1800) was a Maltese doctor of law, and a major philosopher. His area of specialisation in philosophy was chiefly jurisprudence.

== Early life ==
Muscat was born into a poor family on 8 March 1735. He was raised by his aunt after his parents died when he was young. His aunt paid for his university studies, where he studied law, likely at the Collegium Melitense in Valletta.

In 1763, he married Maria Salamone, a widow with three children who were older than him.

== Career ==
=== Professional career ===
After finishing his law degree and becoming a lawyer, Muscat was taken under the wing of one of the legal scribes (called uditore) of the Grand Master of the Knights Hospitaller, Manuel Pinto da Fonseca. This helped Muscat build up a steady clientele which brought him a stable income.

=== Early writings ===
Muscat's earliest extant writings date back to when he was twenty-three years old. A long poetic work in Italian, called Sonnetto (Sonnet), which he composed in 1758 was dedicated to Giammaria Azopardi Castelletti, Adriano Montana and Giuseppe Agius. The first was the Vicar General, and the others Assessors, to the Bishop of Malta, Bartolomé Rull. The work had never been published, and is extant in manuscript form. This document is evidence that Muscat did not always harbour ‘dangerous’ doctrines (as came out afterwards). During this period of his life he seems to have been quite convinced of the traditional political structures of his time and, particularly, with the supreme power exerted by the Pope.

Another early writing, this time from 1771, when Muscat had thirty-six years of age, is called Replica delli Creditori (A Creditors’ Response). This too is in Italian. It was published in Palermo, Sicily, at the printing press of Baron Giacomo Epir, and contains 87 pages. The work was written in response to a publication issued by a certain Giacobbe Berard, who had responded to yet another book. Muscat's book reproduced the same title of Berard's work. The subject of all three publications concerned a particular legal case of localised importance. Nevertheless, in his book Muscat touches upon a theme pertaining to political philosophy which he would go on to develop in other writings, namely the legal independence of a local government from outside interference (including the pope, his bishops or the Inquisition.

=== Philosophical bearing ===
This was no transitory feeling which Muscat had expressed so boldly. His was a position emanating from the study of Enlightenment writings. Indeed, here, as elsewhere, Muscat did not go as far as rejecting religion or calling forth the establishment of a republic. That would have been not only impractical in a society such as that of Hospitaller Malta but also probably did not tally with Muscat's own beliefs. In general, he seems to have believed in the political system adhered to by the Hospitallers, albeit perhaps with a stronger dose of some egalitarian rights, and did not seem to harbour any thoughts of overturning their government. Regarding religion, his objections seem to have been directed towards ecclesiastical and clerical authoritarianism and impertinence, even though he seems to have been deeply religious himself.

Nevertheless, Muscat believed in the separation of Church and State, and in later years he succeeded in gaining the ear of the Hospitaller Grand Masters whom he served. Indeed, the Hospitallers were a religious order, and in this regard ultimately subject to the pope. Nevertheless, in matters pertaining to sovereign government, they could claim autonomy (just like other jurisdictions in Italy and elsewhere enjoyed).

=== Attorney General ===
In Malta's political context such a philosophy could have been explosive. Muscat had no opportunity to put it into practice until around 1775, when newly-elected Grand Master Emmanuel de Rohan-Polduc appointed him as his avvocato del principato (which more or less corresponds to the office of an Attorney General).

The potential menace did not escape the local inquisitor, Giovanni Filippo Gallarati Scotti, who said about Muscat: ‘Since some time ago, the ministers of this secular government, and especially the principality’s attorney general, seem to have changed their way of thinking. [...] The new spirit, which began to take hold of this man’s mind with the Grand Master's approval, has come out with various decisions which are offensive to the liberty of the Church’.

The ‘offensive decisions’ which Scotti referred to were the attempts made by Muscat to curb the effective authority of the pope over the jurisdiction and deliberations of the local government. Certainly, he must have had Muscat's Replica in mind. All of this of course could not please the local inquisitor or the bishop.

=== Corroborative works ===
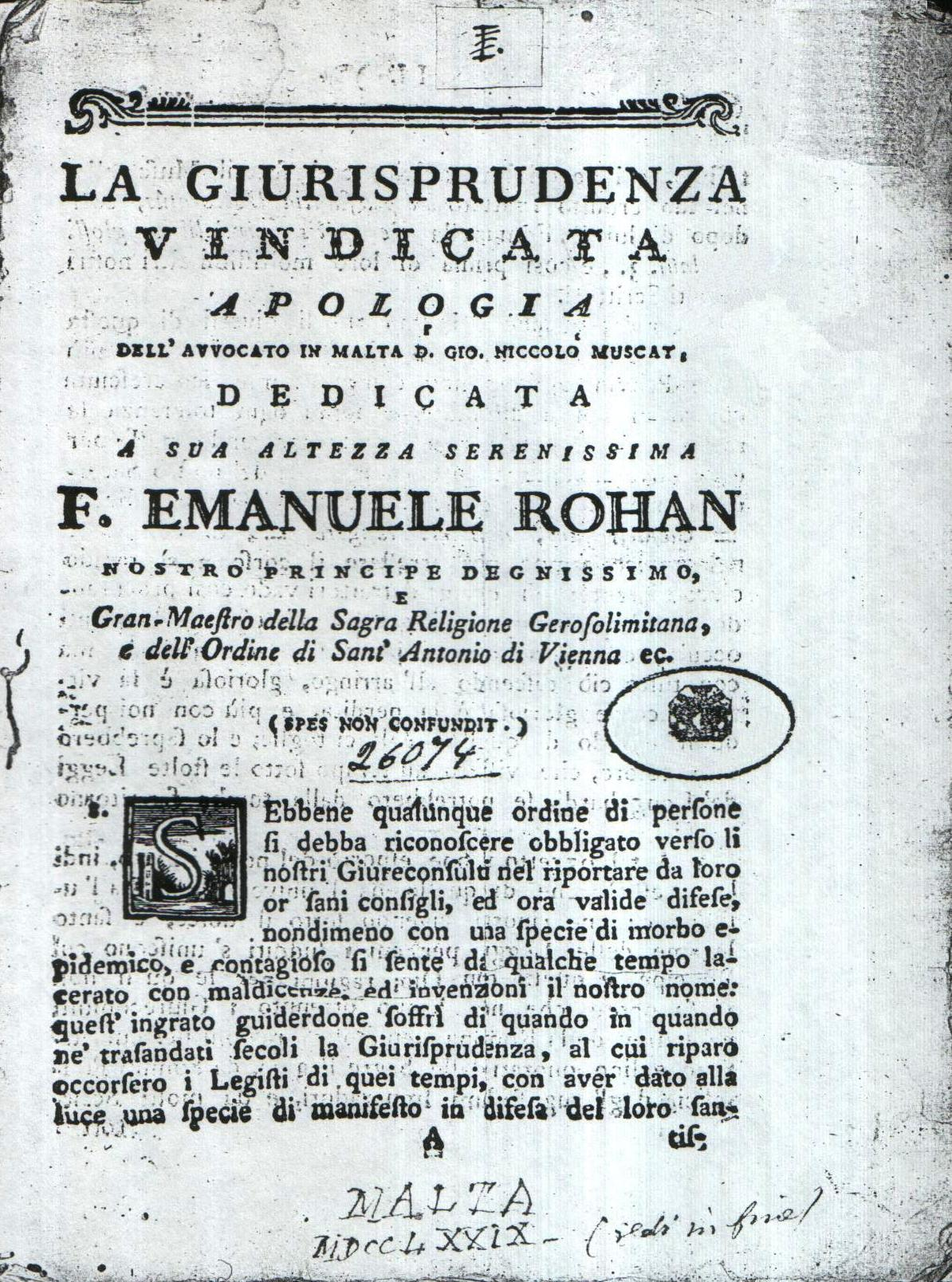
Muscat's La Giurisprudenza Vindicata (1779)

The inquisitor was not prepared to stand idly by while such an affront was levelled against the authority of the Church, so he saw to it that his convictions became known to the authorities in Rome and to the Grand Master.

Meanwhile, in the years which followed Muscat intensified his assault by penning down other noteworthy works. The first seems to have appeared in 1779, called La Giurisprudenza Vindicata (A Reprisal for Jurisprudence). This is a 19-page booklet written in old Italian, and it was published at the Hospitaller printing press under the direction of Giovanni Mallia. Its subtitle is simply Apologia (A Defence). The work is an unbroken discourse in twenty paragraphs dedicated to the Grand Master de Rohan. Muscat's writing is elaborate and sometimes difficult to follow, but his message is clear enough. Muscat takes on his adversaries by insisting that they are calumnious and misrepresented his intentions, even though they had not. In fact, Muscat goes on to confirm and further substantiate the claims he had upheld in favour of the sovereignty and independence of Malta’s government in all decisions within his jurisdiction. While retracting not a single point of his philosophy, Muscat provides a long presentation on the origin of Roman law, and even presents the philosophical basis of his position.

Four years after this work, in 1783, Muscat went on to publish Apologia a Favore dell’Inclita Nazione Maltese (A Defence in Favour of the Renowned Maltese Nation). The very words ‘Maltese nation’ must have sent shivers down the spines of both the local inquisitor and the bishop. These were definitely words with feared and hated Enlightenment overtones. Muscat's book, written in old Italian, has 124 pages, and it was published in Rome at the printing press of the Lazzarini family. The above-mentioned title continues with the words ‘... Suoi Tribunali, Segnatura, e Legisti’ (... its Tribunals, its Secretariat of State, and its Law Consulates). The work is divided in three parts, each containing a number of chapters. Muscat composed it in response to a book, called Ragionamenti (Reasonings), by Giandonato Rogadeo, who sustained that the jurisdiction of Malta's government was limited by the supreme authority of the pope and by his institutions. With frank and candid language, and also with conviction and philosophical clarity, Muscat left no doubt on which side of the fence he stood.

=== Imposing works ===
If this was not enough to make both the inquisitor and the bishop anxious, the year after the appearance of Muscat's Apologia a publication of great consequence was issued by Grand Master de Rohan in which Muscat's hand surely had a part. This was in 1784, and the publication was the Diritto Municipale di Malta (Malta's Domestic Law).

Usually called simply the Codice De Rohan, this book was basically a revision of the entire corpus of laws and legal customs of Malta. For its time it was a masterpiece of jurisprudence. However, in it not only was the Catholic Church not given the absolute authority it expected to have, but reasons were brought forward to retract some of the authority it still retained.

A second publication, issued two years later, in 1786, under the title Bando e Prammatica da Valere in Perpetuo (A Law and Procedure to Stand in Perpetuity), was even more explicit than the Diritto Municipale. It acknowledged that the prince had the right to sanction or abolish the execution of any legal instrument issued by a foreign authority, including the pope, the congregations of the Holy See, and the Inquisition.

Inquisitor Scotti identified Muscat as the one responsible for such pernicious doctrines. According to him, Muscat was one of "those modern philosophers of Malta" "cui il nome pur solo, e l’ombra della Chiesa, e delle Ecclesiastiche preprogative e invidioso e odiosissimo" (for whom the very name and the shadow of the Church, and of ecclesiastical prerogatives, is detestable and hateful).

=== Collision with the Church ===
To defend himself from such accusations, in 1788 Muscat published a tract entitled Memoria (A Memo). However, this did little to dissipate the opposition which had been building up against him. This was exacerbated a year later, in 1789, when de Rohan demanded the suspension of the notorious papal bull In Cœna Domini, and Muscat personally went to stop Bishop Vincenzo Labini from publicly reading the bull. Though such a slur was not heeded by the bishop, the incident certainly did not improve things.

Muscat was determined to put into practice his philosophy. A little after the confrontation with the bishop, he informed the inquisitor that henceforth he would not submit any case before the pope, even those related to the faith, without first tendering them to the Grand Master for his approval. This sent the inquisitor up the wall.

=== First removal from office ===
Muscat was unrelenting in his attack. A few years after clashing with the inquisitor, in 1791, he became involved in another incident which tipped the scales. Muscat maintained that the Church could exert its jurisdiction solely in matters pertaining to the sacraments, the faith, morals, and ecclesiastical discipline.

This seemed to go over the top. Pope Pius VI threatened de Rohan that, if Muscat was not immediately removed from Attorney General, the Holy See will disband the Hospitaller order.

Though this was no light warning, Muscat defended himself most vigorously. He avowed to have been, was, and always will be, a true and faithful son of the Church. Of course, neither his faith nor his faithfulness was the point of the issue. Nevertheless, the inquisitor did not flinch from twisting the knife in the wound. He reminded the pope that, some time back, Muscat himself had declared that ‘This is no longer the century of the Church!’, and ‘If it were in my power I would leave the bishop with only the crosier and the mitre!’ The inquisitor went as far as to inform the pope that (as he had it from his spies), on receiving the news of his requested removal from office, Muscat stated: ‘Puh, as if this would make me lose my appetite!’

Muscat was removed from office in January 1792, and sent to live outside the walls of the capital city, Valletta.

=== Reinstatement and second removal ===
Following his removal from office, de Rohan declined to appoint a successor to the position of Attorney General. This period of vacancy was maintained until the initial public and political controversy had subsided. In April 1792, approximately three months after the dismissal, de Rohan officially reinstated Muscat to his former post.

True to form, Muscat's former impertinence resumed. Just two months later, in June 1792, the pope was compelled again to demand the Grand Master to remove him straight away from all government responsibilities. There was no choice in the matter for de Rohan. This time around, he was also constrained in sending Muscat abroad.

Before leaving Malta, Muscat gathered all his dependencies and encouraged them not to fear acting as he had. He hoped to return in fifty days. However, he told them, even if this were not to be so, he confessed that he was proud to have pulled off ‘a glorious confrontation with the pope’.

Accorded full honours by the Grand Master, Muscat left Malta in July 1792.

=== Back to Malta ===
Muscat went to Naples and then to Messina in Sicily, and he returned to Malta in October 1792. Though he once more became part of government, de Rohan warned him to be prudent and stay out of the limelight. However, Muscat does not seem to have been a man to shy away from bothering the Church.

At one point, he denied the bishop the right to judge a case of divorce since he claimed that marriage was a social contract recognised only by the civil authority. This irked the bishop immensely. Later, defending his responsibility in resisting and curtailing the interference of Rome in the affairs of state, he publicly announced that ‘at long last the pope will have to relinquish all [the power] he has’. Muscat even went as far as to defend the Maltese from being arraigned before the ecclesiastical courts.

Embarrassing the Grand Master without end, de Rohan resolved to give up trying to protect his subject any more. Encouraged by this turn of events, the new local inquisitor, Giulio Carpegna, decided to act quickly. Lest Muscat could be able to backtrack the Grand Master, he wanted him definitely removed.

=== Second reinstatement and final removal ===
In the meantime, in July 1793, Muscat wrote the pope a Memorandum with the intention of restoring him to his former offices. He avowed his faithfulness to the pope and his resolution to defend the jurisdictional rights of the Catholic Church in Malta. ‘Every interference in the matters of the Church,’ he declared, ‘now seem absolutely dangerous because I see that they bring me between the Devil and the deep sea.’

The ruse seemed to have worked. For in September 1793, the Grand Master reinstated Muscat to all his former offices. To the great consternation of the inquisitor, the pope had actually given his blessing for such a restoration of Muscat's fortunes. The pope, however, had approved ‘on the condition that Muscat does not meddle with ecclesiastical affairs’.

The official reinstatement was carried out with great pomp and ceremony. Muscat himself declared that his enemies – all except ‘la briga papalina’ (the papist gang), meaning the Inquisition – were now no more.

Nonetheless, Inquisitor Carpegna was enemy more than Muscat thought. In around October 1793, just one month after the ostentatious reinstatement, he succeeded in removing Muscat for good. Despite being mercifully forestalled the humiliation of being deposed once more, Muscat was forced to retire against a pension.

=== Triumph with Napoleon ===
This time the inquisitor made sure that neither de Rohan nor his successor as Grand Master, Ferdinand von Hompesch zu Bolheim, would change their mind. In the meantime, Muscat was simply waiting in the wings to reclaim his honour.

Five years later, in June 1798, the 268-year-long period of Hospitaller rule came to an end with the French invasion of Malta. Muscat was part of the delegation which negotiated the Hospitallers' capitulation to Napoleon on the ship Orient.

During the next two months, during the French occupation of Malta, Muscat was appointed President of the Civil Courts. The French reformed Malta's government and abolished the Inquisition at this point. However, when a revolt against the Napoleonic forces began in September 1798, Muscat was forced to barricade himself within the walls of Valletta together with the French authorities.

=== Defeat and exile ===
Muscat remained blockaded until November 1798. On being constrained to leave the city, the British expeditionary force took him prisoner and incarcerated him on the island of Gozo. He remained there at least for two years, until around 1800. He was sixty-five years of age.

On his release, Muscat exiled himself and left Malta for Sardinia, off the Italian Peninsula. Nothing is yet known of his whereabouts after that, but he probably died at Sardinia.

== Works in chronological order ==
- 1758 Sonnetto (Sonnet)
- 1771 Replica delli Creditori (A Creditors’ Response)
- 1779 La Giurisprudenza Vindicata (A Reprisal for Jurisprudence)
- 1783 Apologia a Favore dell’Inclita Nazione Maltese (A Defence in Favour of the Famed Maltese Nation) – Unacknowledged contributions
- 1784 Diritto Municipale di Malta (Malta's Legal Code) – Unacknowledged contributions
- 1786 Bando e Prammatica da Valere in Perpetuo (A Law and Procedure to Stand in Perpetuity).
- 1788 Memoria (A Memo)
- 1793 Memorandum (Memorandum)

== Sources ==
- Frans Chiappara, ‘Gio. Nicolò Muscat’, Hospitaller Malta, ed. by V. Mallia-Milanes, Mireva Publications, Malta, 1993.
- Mark Montebello, Il-Ktieb tal-Filosofija f’Malta (A Source Book of Philosophy in Malta), PIN Publications, Malta, 2001.

== See also ==
Philosophy in Malta
