= Castellania (Valletta) =

Maltese government building

- Kastellanja, Kastellanija, Kistlanija, Klistanija, Klistjanija, Chistlania
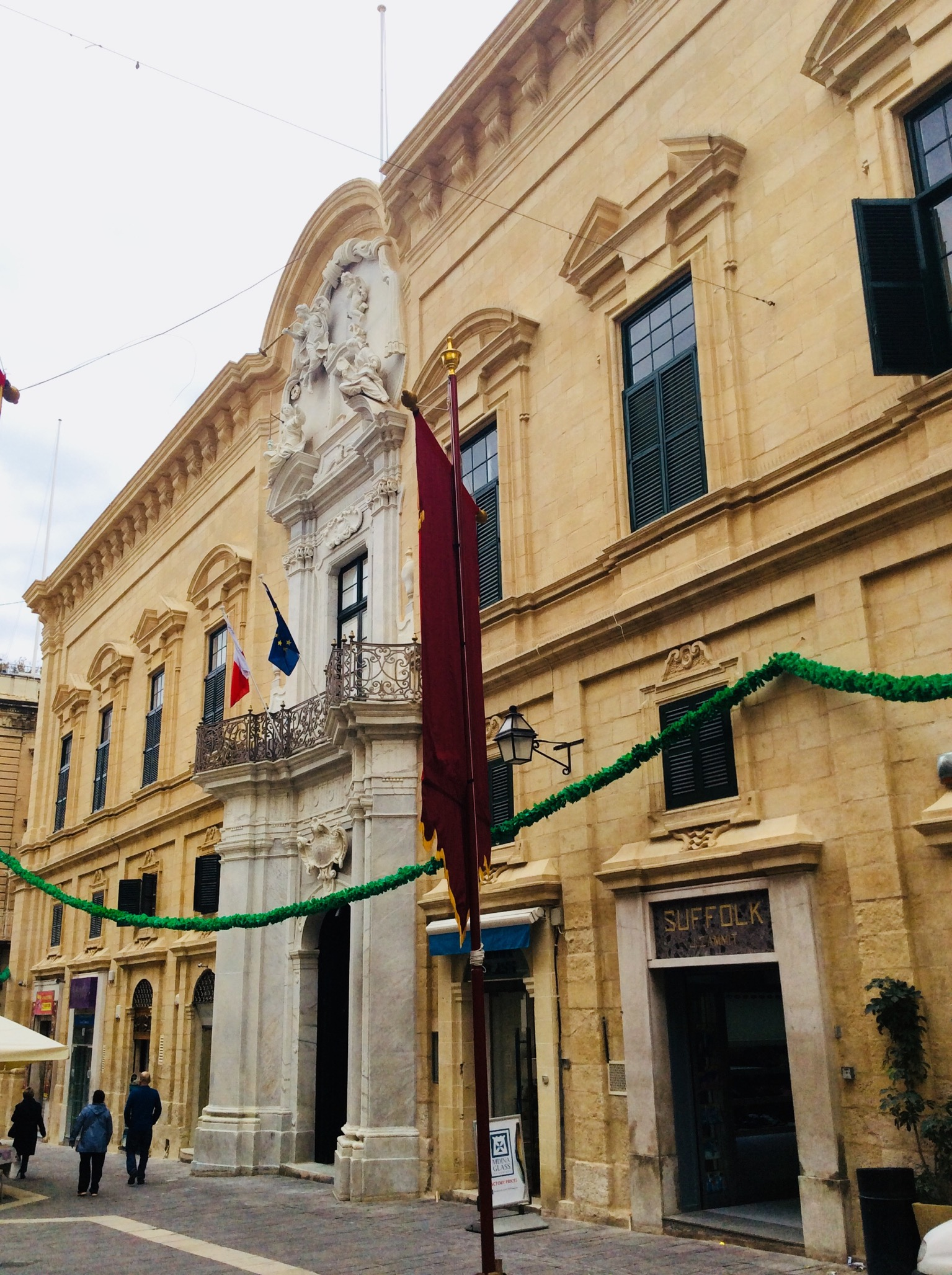
- The main façade of the Castellania in 2018
- Former names: Gran Corte della Castellania (many variants); Gran Corte della Valletta; Palais de Justice; Palace/Courts of Justice; Palazzo di Giustizia; Palazzo della Castellania; Palazzo del Tribunale; Castellany
- Alternative names: Palazzo Castellania; Castellania Palace; Châtellenie

General information
- Status: Intact
- Type: Courthouse
- Architectural style: Baroque
- Location: Valletta, Malta, No. 11–19, Merchants Street, Valletta, VLT 1171
- Coordinates: 35°53′48″N 14°30′45″E
- Current tenants: Ministry for Health, the Elderly and Community Care
- Construction started: 1757 (Note: Achille Ferris (1881) claims the year 1748 for the start of construction. Without quoting any source, Hannibal Publius Scicluna (1915) says that construction began in 1748. Several prominent authors used this misinformation and wrote this year in numerous published literature. Some prominent authors were noted for their inaccuracies. However Paul Cassar (1988) clarifies that construction began by officially laying the first stone during Octave of Corpus Christi in 1757.)
- Opened: 1760
- Owner: Government of Malta

Technical details
- Material: Limestone (façade decorated with Carrara marble)
- Floor count: 2

Design and construction
- Architects: Francesco Zerafa (Completed by Giuseppe Bonici)

The Castellania (Maltese: Il-Kastellanija; Italian: La Castellania), also known as the Castellania Palace (Maltese: Il-Palazz Kastellanja; Italian: Palazzo Castellania), is a former courthouse and prison in Valletta, Malta that currently houses the country's health ministry. It was built by the Order of St. John between 1757 and 1760, on the site of an earlier courthouse which had been built in 1572.

The building was built in the Baroque style to design of the architect Francesco Zerafa, and completed by Giuseppe Bonici. It is a prominent building in Merchants Street, having an ornate façade with an elaborate marble centrepiece. Features of the interior include former court halls, a chapel, prison cells, a statue of Lady Justice at the main staircase and an ornate fountain in the courtyard.

From the late 18th to the early 19th century, the building was also known by a number of names, including the Palazzo del Tribunale, the Palais de Justice and the Gran Corte della Valletta. By the mid-19th century the building was deemed too small, and the courts were gradually moved to Auberge d'Auvergne between 1840 and 1853. The Castellania was then abandoned, before being briefly converted into an exhibition centre, a tenant house and a school.

In 1895, the building was converted into the head office of the Public Health Department. The department was eventually succeeded by Malta's health ministry which is still housed in the Castellania. The building's ground floor contains a number of shops, while the belongings of Sir Themistocles Zammit's laboratory are now housed at the second floor and is open to the public by appointment as The Brucellosis Museum.

== History ==
=== Institution ===
The Magna Curia Castellania (MCC; Italian: Gran Corte della Castellania; English: High Court of the Castellania) was a court and tribunal in Hospitaller Malta. The institution had been founded by the Order of St. John in Palestine in 1186. It was later established in Rhodes where it became known as Pragmaticæ Rhodiæ, and remained active there until the expulsion of the Order from the island in 1522.

The institution was established in Malta on 5 September 1533 after the arrival of the Order, during the magistracy of Grandmaster Philippe de L'Isle-Adam and it is sometimes distinguishably known as the Magnæ Curiæ Caſtellaniæ Melitenſis. It was among the first institutions that was found to require reforms. Johannes Quintinus was given responsibility to prepare the first set of laws for Malta, which were later established by the Grand Master. The institution followed the Sicilian legal system, known as the Ritus Magnæ Curiæ Siciliæ.

It was headed by a Castellan, also known as the President of the Castellania, who was a knight of the Order. He was ceremonially always followed by a page boy carrying a rod on a cushion when walking in public, with the rod symbolising his position, earning him the nickname captain of the rod.

=== Composition ===
The institution included two judges, one for the civil court and one for the criminal court. In the same building were the Office and Court of Appeals. The judges of the Castellania were native Maltese and dealt with cases that took place in the district of Valletta, Floriana and the Three Cities. Other districts, such as those under the courts of Mdina and Rabat, followed the same model and had to adopt decisions taken at the Castellania. On three days per week, the Fiscal Prosecutor brought cases before the judges. There was a Head Notary and a Cancelliere, who was responsible for receiving and preserving judicial acts, registering the sentences meted out by the judges and supervising the other workers in the courts. A Gran Visconte served as chief of police, and the Capitani di notte implemented the sentences. Other workers included an official who saw that prisoners were treated fairly, those who were responsible for the archives, and advocates for legal aid. Advocates were generally Italian-speaking Maltese, as most knights and foreigners considered the position for the inferior people. A report was drafted weekly and sent to the palace of the Grand Master, informing about occurrences presented to the Castellania.

The Castellania was the supreme court of justice of the islands, hence called Gran Corte or the variants in legal documents. The Grand Master had the absolute power to preside over the institution. The Papacy quarreled for a superior decision, such as when there was conflict with the court of the Bishop, but citing sovereignty of the princely Grand Master it was never conceded. The Castellania originally had decision over every aspect of life, including public morality and religion, but having the Islands been visited by an official of the Holy See in the 16th century and found lack of enforcement by the knights in religious aspects, the Inquisition was established. With the presence of the Inquisition, the Holy See considered Malta similar to a colony, but through the Castellania the Order kept rigid control and sovereignty over Malta. Though the Inquisition had the power to issue a death penalty in cases related to religion, such as heresy, fornication and sodomy, it generally left it at the discretion of the Castellania. Religious monks, including the Bishop of Malta, were not to be subject of decisions taken by the Castellania but there were instances of having to make exceptions as per offense to the state. In the late eighteenth century, under Grand Master de Rohan, Giovanni Niccolò Muscat has triggered significant controversy over his views on church-state separation in matters which are not religious in nature.

In its time, the Castellania was considered to be a secular court. Cases generally consisted of secular parties, with secular accusations, for cases of secular nature. Officially it treated people with more equity; religious courts in Malta under Roman Catholicism would refer to non-Christians and people with diverse abilities as creatures, because of their "imperfection", whereas the Castellania considered all people as humans. However the Castellania distinguished the non-Christians by considering all others as aliens, of which difference also has had negative impact in terms of equality before the law, and in practice it was still theocratic. Women had same rights as men to institute for court action. In military context the knights were not subject to the Castellania, and were instead prosecuted at the Military Tribunal (Tribunale Militare), however it received assistance from the higher hierarchy of the Castellania such as from the judge of the criminal court. The law was amended with the issue of a Bando by the Grand Master. Particular bandi regulated the procedures of medicating a seriously wounded person, where the Castellania had to be informed by medical practitioners within less than a day from the assistance.

=== From Birgu to Valletta ===
The courts and tribunals were initially housed in a building in Birgu. After the Order moved their headquarters to Valletta, the Castellania moved as well. The Castellania building in Birgu was handed to the Inquisition for free.

In Valletta, it was initially housed inconveniently in Strada Stretta, at the back of the Treasury of the Order, in a building belonging to Bailiff Bandinelli. It was sometimes known as baglio, an Italian architectural reference to courthouses, or Tribunale della Giustizia. Grand Master Jean de la Cassière bought the present site of the Castellania in Valletta for the courts to have an adequate location. Meanwhile, the original Castellania in Birgu was converted into the Inquisitor's Palace in 1574. The building of a Castellania was made in the original plans of Valletta. One of the plans for the Castellania was also to be built within the reserved area of the auberges of the knights, known as the Collacchio, but limiting access to a vast area in Valletta was found to be unpractical and the initiative was abandoned.

The first Castellania marked with 'Z', depicted on a map dated c. 1600.

The first purposely built Castellania in Valletta was built in 1572 by la Cassière, and was likely designed by Girolamo Cassar, similar to other Valletta buildings of the late 16th century. The building had a military appearance, with the corners designed with massive quoins, typical of Cassar. Though the building had only one actual corner on St John Street crossing with the Square, the other ends touched the adjoining buildings. The Castellania made use of a bell, became popularly known as the ruffiana, to convey messages to the people and inform about an event. A chapel was located in the building for the spiritual services of prisoners. Similar to other prominent buildings, the Castellania was provided with water within its courtyard by connection to the Wignacourt Aqueduct. In 1646, Pierre Garsin was commissioned to execute works within the prison section of the first Castellania which constituted of works on the walls that were examined to be in a state close to collapse. People in prison were generally those awaiting trial by the Castellania, but also by the Inquisition. Regulated visits to captives were allowed. The building had a main front door which was used for official purposes such as by the Castellan of the Gran Corte della Castella.

The Magistrato degli Almamenti or Tribunale degli Armamenti, founded by Grand Master Wignacourt, was initially housed in the first Castellania building but moved to a separate location during the rule of Grand Master Perellos, who had established the Consolato del Mare in 1697. The first Castellania of Valletta was demolished in the mid-18th century on orders of Grand Master Manuel Pinto da Fonseca, as he despised its austere architecture and wanted a symbolic building of his absolutism. Pinto continued on similar steps of his predecessor, Grand Master Wignacourt, by taking several initiatives and make stately projects, and a new Castellania was one of the main prospects.

There are claims based on word of mouth that in the 18th century the courts and tribunals were housed at 254, St. Paul's Street (now known as Europe House, and occupied by the offices of the European Commission and the European Parliament), plausibly between 1757 and 1760, however this is considered as a hearsay.

== Construction ==
Inscription commemorating the reconstruction of the Castellania

Knights Giacomo de Blacas d'Aups and the Giorgio Valperga di Masino were given monopoly rights for four decades over the use of wind-power machines for the production of marble, metals, limestone and timber in Malta by Pinto in 1752. As a benefit of granting such license, Pinto secured the benefit that service for the construction of public and private projects would cost a quarter less than if handmade. The limestone used was from Misra(h) il-Barrieri in Santa Venera. A new Baroque building was constructed on site of the first Castellania, creating significant employment, with works commencing in 1757. Throughout the course of construction, prisoners were held in a tower near Valletta's Porta Reale, probably the tower of Saint James Cavalier.

The new Castellania was built to a design by the architect Francesco Zerafa, but he died during its construction on 21 April 1758. His work was completed by then Engineer, who was just elevated to architect, Giuseppe Bonici. Zerafa is accredited for the main design, and for the subjected building he has post mortem established himself as a respected architect. The edifice was completed in 1760, and saw the last finishes in October of that year, after which on 23 of that month was able to accommodate its intended functions. As a general rule, by the Officio delle Case (Officium Commissariorum Domorum), the buildings in Valletta were required to be ready within three-years period from start to completion. The Castellania was built in conformity with the Officio delle Case. The chapel was consecrated on 15 November of that year, which also marked the official inauguration. The main commemoration for the opening is an inscription above the central doorway which praises Grand Master Pinto for his achievement in rebuilding the courthouse. The prisoners were transferred to the new prison three days later, on 18 November 1760.

Local hard limestone was used for construction, however the main portico was decorated with Carrara marble. Some of the marble used was cannibalized from the ruins of the Temple of Proserpina, an ancient Roman temple in Mtarfa which had been discovered in 1613. (Note: According to Giovanni Francesco Abela.) A craftsman who worked on the decorative sculpture of the Castellania's façade's central-piece and chapel was Maestro Giovanni Vito, the Puglisi (from Pùglia), a Neapolitan buonavoglia (a rower on the galleys). He would become the first man to be convicted of murder and sentenced to death by hanging in the new Castellania, on 15 December 1760. As part of the remodelling, Pinto marked it throughout the interior and the exterior with his heraldic symbol of couchant crescents, to convey a message of his absolutism and wealth. Sometime after its completion, artist Tiepolo Favray noted the building. It was widely judged to be opulent enough for the most powerful nations.

== Courthouse ==
During the 18th century, because it hosted the courts and the tribunals, it was known as the Corte della Castellania (or the variants) and sometimes as the Palazzo del Tribunale. Among the common public was, however, simply known as the Court of the Grandmaster, probably to simply distinguish it from the courts of the inquisition and of the Bishop.

Some judges of the Castellania, such as Vincenzo Bonavita (1752–1829), served during four different periods- firstly during the Order of St John, then during French occupation, the British protectorate and finally under the Crown Colony period. The locals preferred to be subjected to the Court of the Bishop or the Inquisition, rather than Castellania.

=== Order of St John ===
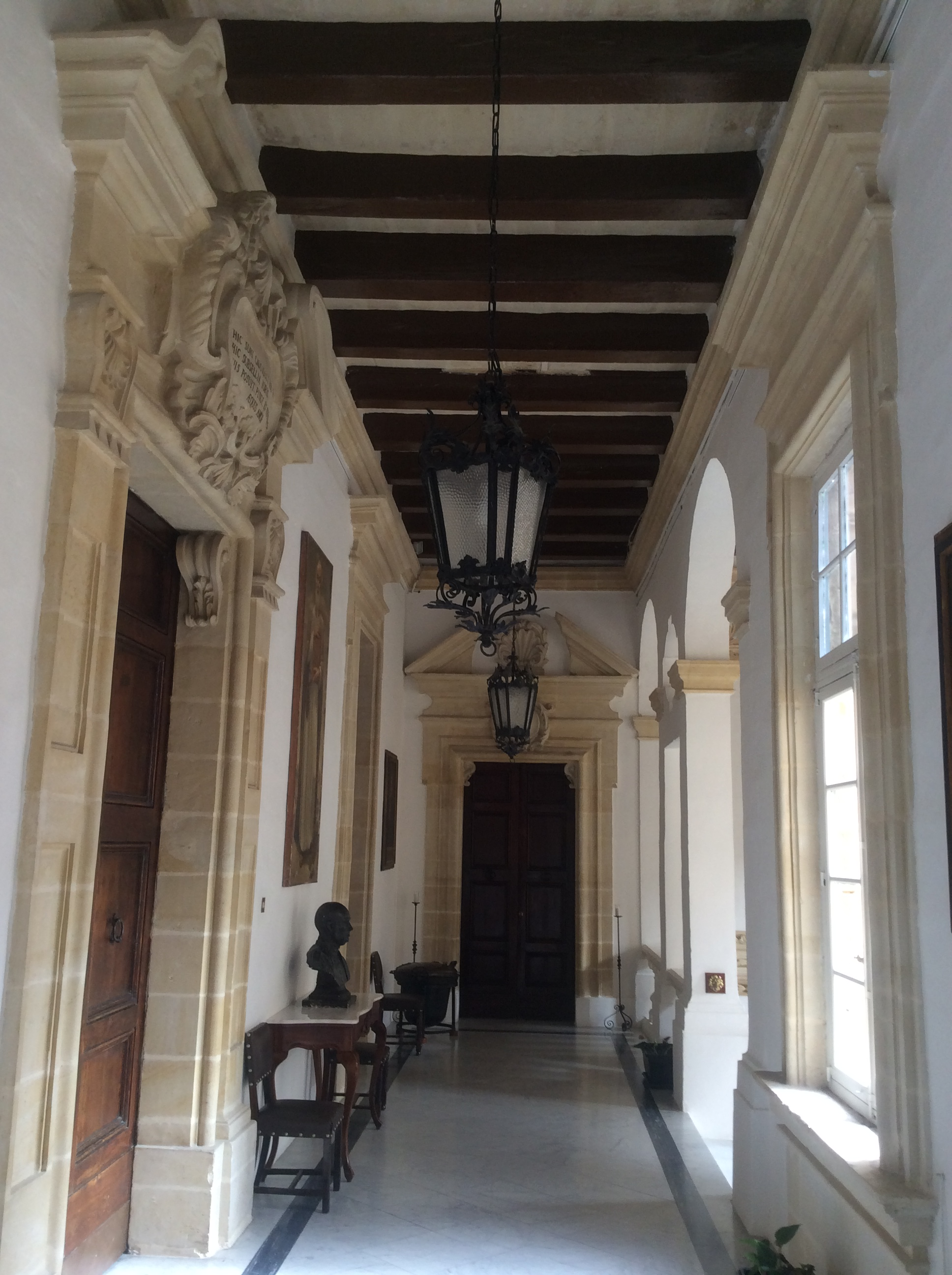
Interior of the Castellania

Civil and criminal cases commenced after its completion, as was intended. Court sittings already started to be heard at the remodeled Castellania prior its inauguration. Conflict between the court of the Grand Master and that the court of the Bishop was a common issue during the reign of Pinto. The Bishop of Malta continuously lobbied against sentences by the Castellania when the accused was a monk. Several instances went as far as Rome to be settled. Pinto believed that it was justified to take a decision when state interest is threatened.

Homosexual practice was punishable by death by the Castellania. In an uncommon case heard in 1774 was when an intersex person, 17-year-old Rosaria "Rosa" Mifsud, a.k.a. Primitiva, from Luqa petitioned for a sex change to wear as a man, instead of the female clothing worn ever since born. Two medical experts were appointed by the court to perform an examination. This case gives detail of the use of experts in the field, similar to the late modern period. The examiners were the Physician-in-Chief (Note: During the British period the position was replaced by the Chief Government Medical Officer) and a senior surgeon, both working at the Sacra Infermeria. The Grandmaster took the decision for Mifsud to wear only men clothes from then on. The decision was taken to the court of appeals, which appointed other seven medical experts that agreed with the observations of the previous two experts.

Following the Rising of the Priests in 1775, three of the rebellion's leaders were executed without receiving fair trial. The death penalty was signed by the Castellano under the orders of Grand Master Francisco Ximénez de Tejada. Prior to judgement, some of the rebellions were locked up in the secretive prisons near the courtroom of the Castallania, some at the Castellania dungeons, and in other Valletta buildings. All those arrested were recorded on the Libro del Carcerati Della Magna Curia Castellania. Among them was Gaetano Mannarino, the leader of the rebellion. Some of them were condemned to death by strangulation in the dungeons of the Castellania. The whole process went against the conformity of the courts in Malta as the priests were not to be subjected to the Castellania but to the court of the Bishop. However the Inquisition had already determined in previous decision-making that crimes of serious nature were not to have ecclesiastical immunity from criminal prosecution at the Castellania. Some sources say that only the laymen were prosecuted at the Castellania, while the priests were tried at Fort St Elmo. Ximenes died a natural death within weeks after the sentences, with some locals believing it was a divine providence for his merciless judgement against the clergy.

In 1777, Grand Master Emmanuel de Rohan-Polduc introduced the Supremum Justitiæ Magistratum (Collegiate Tribunal of the Jury's Supreme Magistrate) in order to establish more separation of powers in judicial decisions. Giandonato Rogadeo, an eminent European jurist, was requested to come to Malta in 1781 by de Rohan to address issues related to common law. Rogadeo went on to author the Diritto Municipale, between the year of his arrival and 1784, a law book to be used for the Castellania. During his stay in Malta, he further observed that it was not the law which was just problematic but also the judges and advocates which were corrupt. His work was opposed by the advocates and judges, with Baron Gaetano Pisani and Judge Gio Nicoló Muscat anonymously publishing works in Rome in 1783 to challenge it and aiming to keep the status quo which had limited considerations. It became the primarily Maltese law of the Code de Rohan, a humane set of laws, which brought significant reformation to criminal law. The Code incorporated previous laws introduced from former Grand Masters with a more liberal approach. It also set standard regulations for advocates, with some flexibility. It was subsequently amended with the use of bandi. The Code de Rohan clarified the role and powers of the "Giudice Criminale della Gran Corte della Castellania". It gave judges the right to decide on cases presented before them, instruct for investigations of serious nature, conduct inquiries, take action as themed necessarily.

The Diritto Municipale was abolished in 1854, during the British period, and replaced by a more lenient Criminal Code. During his magistracy, Grand Master de Rohan sentenced the Castellan, allegedly for practicing conflict of interest considering his position, to a life in prison but was allowed to escape and lived in exile.

Giuseppe Elia Pace, an advocate and close friend of Mikiel Anton Vassalli, was found guilty of treason during the reign of de Rohan and was sentenced for flogging in Valletta followed by a permanent exile out of Malta. Vassalli was imprisoned at the Klistanija at the end of the rule of the Order of St. John, and was accused of plotting revolutionary ideas during the magistracy of Grand Master Hompesch. Vassalli denied the accusations and remained imprisoned. Meanwhile, he received visits from the father of Fortunato Panzavecchia. While dining together around a table with prison guards, Panzavecchia took notes from conversations he had with Vassalli. These notes shed more light on the life of Vassalli, who after his death became the national Maltese linguistic. Though given a life sentence, he either managed to escape or was released after the expulsion of the Order from Malta.

=== French Republic ===
Malta was invaded by the French First Republic in June 1798, and the Order was expelled from the island, resulting in the French occupation of Malta. Grand Master Hompesch was pressured to capitulate, as the Maltese nobility and the Magistrate of the Castellania, together with influential and high ranking figures made it clear to the Fiscal of the Castellania that, unless he surrendered, those resisting the French would have to simultaneously face an internal revolution. The French reformed the legal system with the country being divided into provinces for roughly each 3,000 inhabitants, all with their own civil and criminal jurisdiction for the Justice of Peace: this included the use of the Castellania. Corporal punishment, which was leniently used at the end of the rule of the Order of St John, was officially abolished by the French. Religious figures, such as Franciscan Prelate Monsignor Axisa, were prosecuted at the Castellania and also kept there under arrest if required.

The institution of the Castellania was replaced by the Tribunale Provisorio and the Tribunale Civile di Prim'Instanza. The post of Castellano was abolished, and judges were nominated by the Commission de Gouvernement. By 6 July public buildings in Valletta were renamed, with the Castellania renamed as Palais de Justice. The creation of the newly introduced court in Malta according to republican ideals, on 16 July 1798, saw the abolition of the Order's Courts and Tribunals together with the abolition of the Courts of the Bishop and the Inquisition. Giovanni Niccolò Muscat was made a judge and president of the court during the French period but was soon dismissed by the French. Not less than three full cases of silver secured at the Castellania, were taken by the French on 8 November 1798, and were melted to create coins to remunerate the Jacobins. It was one of a series of similar reasons that consequently triggered a Maltese revolt. The French law system did not last enough to influence the Maltese courts at the time.

=== British protectorate ===
After a successful Maltese uprising against the French occupation, in 1800 Malta became a British protectorate, with the Castellania becoming known as the Gran Corte della Valletta. It was amongst the first public institutions to be reestablished. The documents of the Tribunale della Gran Corte della Castellania were given by Government Alexander Ball to the Gran Corte Vescovile (Court of the Bishop) with other documents of the church and the Inquisition at the request of the ecclesiastic authorities. Apart from those of the Court of the Bishop, the others (including those of the Castellania) were all found to be irrelevant to the church and were transferred to the Palace of the Inquisition in Birgu. The documents of the Tribunale della Valletta were likely transferred to the palace of the Inquisition by mistake but those arriving there never saw their way back to Valletta since. On 8 March 1805, a proclamation declared the restoration of the Courts of Justice. In February 1806, Ball gave instructions to presumably guarantee independence of the Judiciary, whereas the Judges could not be removed at a simple request, and legal persons would not be threatened to be jailed if they disagree with signing legal documents. At the request of the Maltese National Congress, the law was once again reformed to the ancient rights and the Code De Rohan.

Vassalli was imprisoned again during the siege, and was kept at the Castellania from 16 September 1800 until he was exiled from the protectorate on 15 January 1801. While in jail at the Castellania, Vassalli read in Arabic, and vocally translated to Maltese, passages of the Quran to other inmates among him. His Quran, bound by a leather cover, was discovered when Vassalli underwent a spot check by British soldiers in the whereabouts of Porta Reale.

Between 1810 and 1811 most Valletta buildings were given addresses. The first address of the main door of the building was in Italian as istrada Mercanti, No.15, La Castellania. Ġampatist Gatt was engaged with the Criminal Court as an interpreter and translator, to and from English, from 1 August 1810 to 30 June 1814. The death penalty continued to be legal under British rule and the decapitation of the offender after execution remained in use by the Castellania.

In the early 19th century the building housed the Maltese Vice-Admiral Court. It was founded in June 1803. John Stoddart (1773–1856) served as the first Advocate to the British monarchy from 1803 to 1807. By 1811, during the protectorate, this court was criticized in Parliament as being unbecoming in its conduct during the early stages of establishment. It was replaced by another court and abolished in the 1890s. Literature and objects related the Vice-Admiralty Court in Malta are now exhibited at the Malta Maritime Museum in Birgu.

=== British colony ===
Maltese courts became on 5 October 1813, months before the Treaty of Paris of 1814, when Malta became a Crown colony. Soon after, in 1813, Civil Commissioner Alexander Ball terminated and transferred the judicial power of the Corte Capitanale of Mdina to the Castellania in Valletta.

Similar to other public buildings, the Castellania was closed down during the plague outbreak of 1813–14, and it was only used for emergency cases relating to the plague itself. Two people were sentenced to death for not revealing themselves of being infected of plague to relevant authorities and putting at risk the people around them. Both were executed by firing squad outside the courthouse in the street. When the plague ended, the Castellania was once again used as a courthouse and jail for accused who were still awaiting trial.

Under Governor Thomas Maitland, the British adopted a codification of a mixed system of Civil Law, which included Roman Law, Code Napoléon and continental law. Crown Advocate Adrian Dingli was trusted with the task of reforms. These reforms remain the basic of Maltese law today. By 1814 all forms of torture were abolished, however any action deemed to potentially incite a revolt could be suppressed with physical force. In 1814, the College of Auditors (Segnatura) was abolished and was replaced by the Supreme Council of Justice. The purpose of this reform was to see more equity at law at a time when the governor observed that there were questionable judicial cases, and thus gave an opportunity for review.

The Government Gazette started to report prominent cases of the court after the visit of the Commissioners Austin and Lewis.

=== Language ===
Tuscan Italian, and to some extent Latin, was used as the main functioning language of the courts throughout the periods of the knights, French occupation, British periods, until at least 1879 when the courts had already moved out of the building.

Though Maltese has always remained in use throughout the Knights period among all classes of society, the Councillor of the Supreme Tribunal of Justice Francesco Saverio Farrugia implied that Italian was considered as the maternal language which connects the country with the rest of Europe. The French language was established as the sole official language during the French occupation, however an exception was given to the courts as Italian prevailed for legal jargon. Efforts by the British to spread the usage of English during the protectorate and the early period of direct Crown control over Malta failed, mostly due to the unwillingness by the educated minority to adopt it. The supreme court proceedings were suggested to take place with the use of English, to encourage the study and use of English by judges and lawyers, but these efforts proved futile. Both during the period of French occupation and British rule, the supreme court decisions were published in Italian and the other preferred language of the government; French during the French period and English during the British periods. The Maltese language was never discussed as a possible language to be used in the Castellania. However, some documents presented to the courts were sometimes written with Italian and a mix of Sicilian or Maltese words. The language question was not solved until the 20th century, when the building had for long changed purpose.

== Prison ==
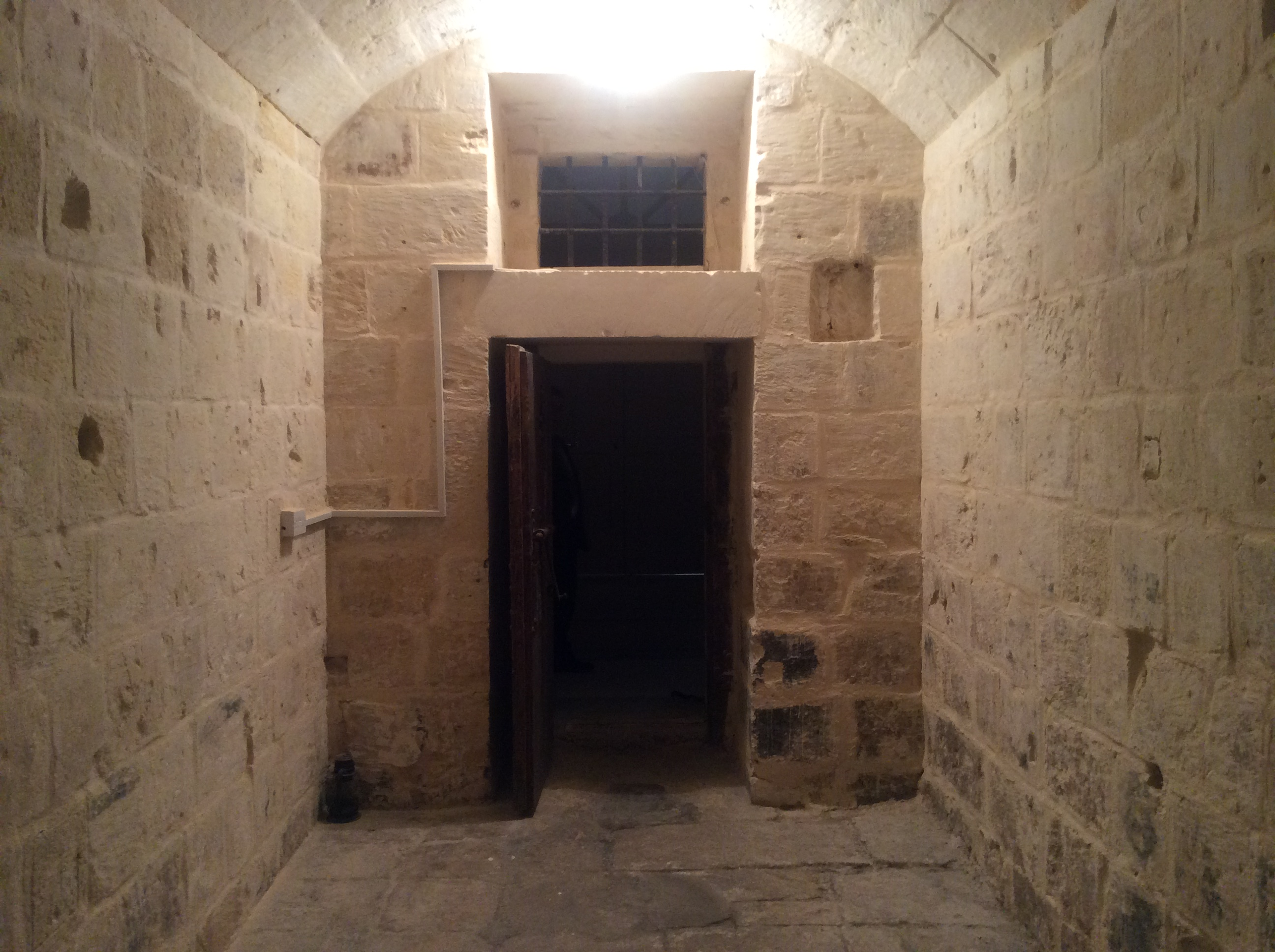
A prison cell in the Castellania

Apart from a courthouse, the Castellania also served as a prison where suspects and convicts were imprisoned. The entrance of the former prison from St John Street and is locally known as Prisoner's Street (Triq il-Kalzrati) or Hook's Street (Triq il-Ganc). Serious criminal offenders from Gozo would be taken to the court in Gozo, and on the decision of the administrative Castellan would be sent to a temporary prison in Fort Chambray, before travelling by sea to Valletta and kept locked at the Castellania until his case is heard.

It was common to restrain political prisoners by locking them in the secure prison of the Castellania during the magistracy of the Order of St John. Prisoners who not awaiting trial were allowed to have visits from non-inmates.

Under the Order of St. John, prisoners could be sentenced to row on the galleys as punishment. Under British rule, certain crimes were punished with penal transportation to Australia, such was the case in June 1790 of Englishman John Pace. During carnival celebrations, cross-dressing males could be arrested, and those caught by police were held overnight at the Castellania "to study for a night manners more comporting with the modest of the sex."

On 15 March 1849, Lorenzo Bonello was assigned by the Governor to give service as the "Keeper of the Castellania" at the prison. The prison was permanently closed and moved to the "Palace of the Courts of Justice" in 1853. Lorenzo Aguis, a public official working as a porter, was catering for the prison before and after it became vacant. (Note: 1853 ordinance VI, updated by 1854 ordinance I.)

== Other uses ==
While the Castellania was in use as a courthouse and a prison, parts of the building were also used for a number of other purposes. The Castellan resided in an apartment in the same Castellania. (Note: Dell Officio del Castellano della Grande Corte della Castellania.) The building hosted the Chamber of Commerce and the sittings of the Consulato del Mare in the eighteenth century, which were next to each other. It also housed the Monte di Sant'Anna until 1773, a decision taken by Grand Master Ximenes.

Individuals or groups could petition at the Castellania through a supplica; common cases were from practitioners needing a license to perform their occupation and the poor requesting social benefits. For such purposes and other, the Castellania and related tribunals employed the largest number of clerks. At one point, the working environment of the clerks had no standard working hours and their outcome received country-wide criticism; this resulted in counter petitions, with the clients requesting efficient service in less waiting time and the clerks requesting increase in wages. By 1780 a bando was introduced to address these issues. Clerks were not required to be Maltese, but had to be fluent in Italian which appealed to Sicilians.

Sea vessels were required by law to register at the Castellania to operate in Maltese waters and each had to pay a minimum ten grani, depending on the size of the vessel and its purpose. With the Registri Patentarum, the Castellania issued legal patents for galleys to travel from the port of Valletta to other ports and vice versa. The patents gave details subject to health inspections which included the names of the merchants and the description of the belongings for trade. Those galleys coming from non-European ports or from places subjected to possible disease were withheld in quarantine for days and only given permission to mix with the rest of the people once a Pratica was issued by the Commission of Public Health. The Clean Bill of Health continued to be issued and gradually reformed during the British period, under the supervision of the Chief Medical Officer. The Castellania imposed a charge for those not having health assurance and having to lodge at the Lazzaretto.

Titles of nobility were required to be recognized by the Cancelleria and then registered at the Castellania. Each noble title was subject to review by the judges or the Castellan. Most services at the edifice of the Castellania, such as court cases and office work, were against payment which balanced the expenses of the institution. At any given point, the Castellania could request for the valuation of goods to determine facts.

Francesco Rivarola, the commandant of the police, had his office of the Deputy Inspector General of Executive Police stationed within the Castellania since 1814 when Malta was gradually adapting as a British colony. The police office vacated the premises in the 19th century and was moved to the Palace of the Governor. As published on the Malta Government Gazette, on 21 October 1829, Malta saw the introduction of a jury system in cases related to murder.

== Later and present use ==
The building was no longer regarded as being adequate to function as a courthouse by 1840, during the Government of Sir Henry Bouverie, and that year the Civil Courts were moved to Auberge d'Auvergne. The courts of criminal jurisdiction and the office of the police were moved to the auberge in 1853. The police office fully moved out around 1860, as initial criminal proceedings were still addressed at the Castellania by that year. Court archives and registrations documents of the Castellania were relocated for safekeeping in the auberge.

=== Mess ===
By a Governor Ordinance No. 11 of 5 May 1852 the Castellania had to be converted into a military mess for the Maltese Militia Force. It is known to have been occupied by the military stationed in Valletta and Floriana by at least 1854.

=== Exhibition centre ===
The building later housed an exhibition centre. Despite the efforts of originality in science subjects it failed to attract crowds to sustain it.

=== Division into three parts ===
It was eventually split into three parts a tenants living quarters (Maltese: kerreja) in the former prison, a Government High School for Girls in the former courthouse and the Gas Office in the former police office. The Malta and Mediterranean Company Limited terminated its operations with a parliamentary approval of the Gas Act of November 1952. The latter later served as the headquarters of the St. John Ambulance Association.

In 1894, the Malta Society of Arts, Manufactures and Commerce (established in 1852) housed a temporary exhibition at the Castellania. The building was considered ideal to showcase the works of the society by local artisans. However, Gerald Strickland handed the artisans society another building in St John Street opposite St John's Co-Cathedral, the Palazzo Xara (destroyed in WWII) so that the Castellania can be vacated for a more permanent use.

- Expand section

=== Department and Ministry for Health ===
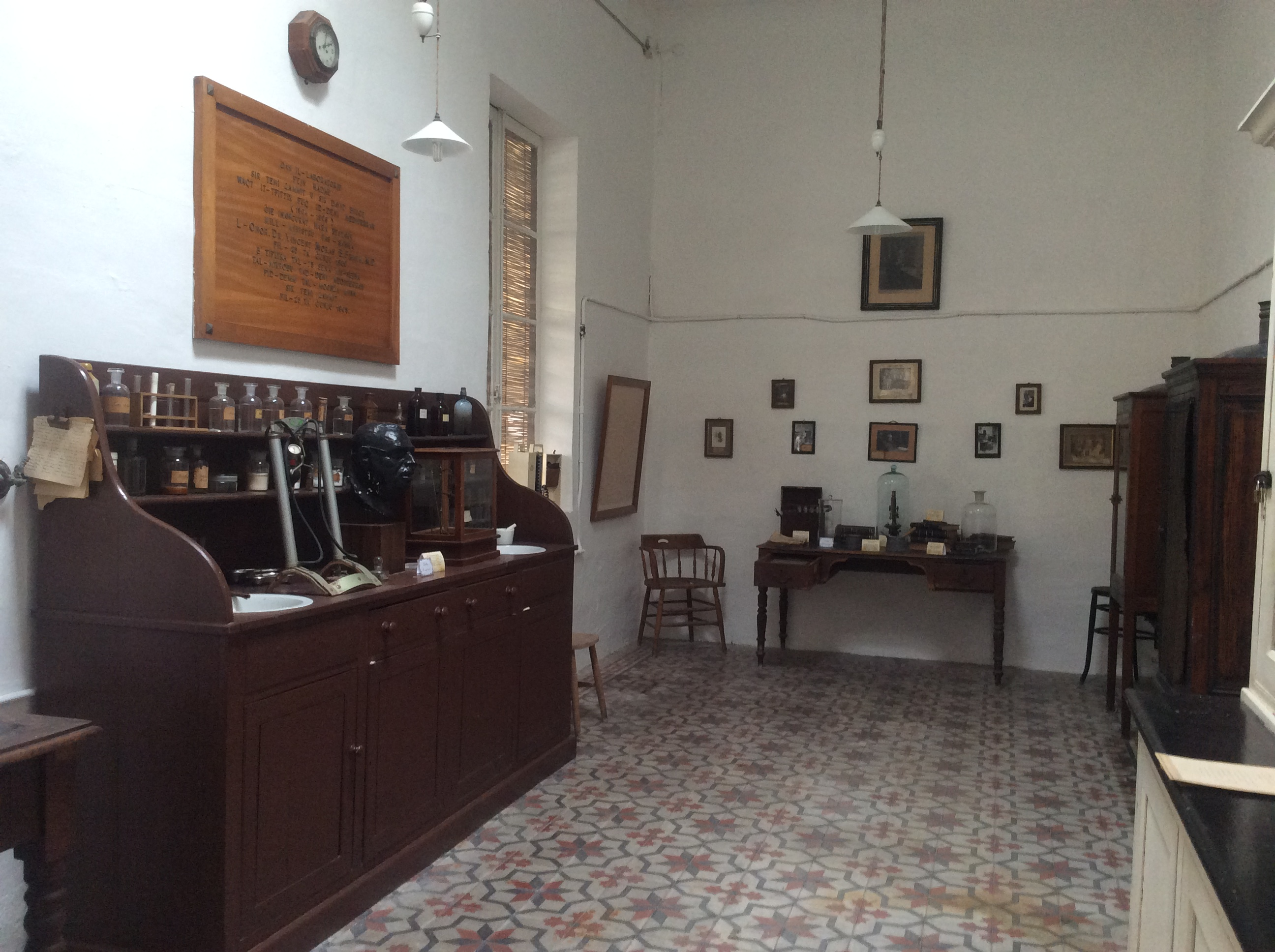
The Brucellosis Museum within the Castellania

The building became the seat of the Chief Government Medical Officer in 1895. This took place on 10 April 1895, when Gerald Strickland transferred into the building the head office of the Public Health Department, which in 1937 combined them as the Medical and Health Department.

Between 1904 and 1906, the Malta Fever Commission (MFC) worked in the Castallania, and on 14 June 1905 the physician Sir Themistocles Zammit discovered the cause behind the Mediterranean fever (known also by various names) while working there. The fever was first traced in Malta to British soldiers fighting against the French occupation of Malta.

In June 1904, during the experiments, Zammit learned that a Maltese family of five members became simultaneously ill after consuming fresh unpasteurized milk from goats. He went on to purchase healthy goats and tested them, and at one point also kept them on the first floor of the Castellania (then known as the public health building or the variants). Zammit was successful in the discovery of the disease. David Bruce, who led the MFC, discouraged the experiments when proposed by Zammit. However, when the experiment concluded in the discovery, Bruce tried to discredit Zammit by taking the merit for himself. Information about the role of Zammit was kept low profile or ignored. The fever was renamed after Bruce, as brucellosis. The MFC managed to find cure and ways to eradicate the fever, but had a hard time since there was lack of cooperation with sellers and consumers of milk; some dismissing or ignoring the finding. It was under control by 1938, with the enforcement of standard procedures of pasteurizing milk. However, slaughtering of infected animals continued throughout the 20th century and there was another rising challenge for the department in 1994 and 1995.

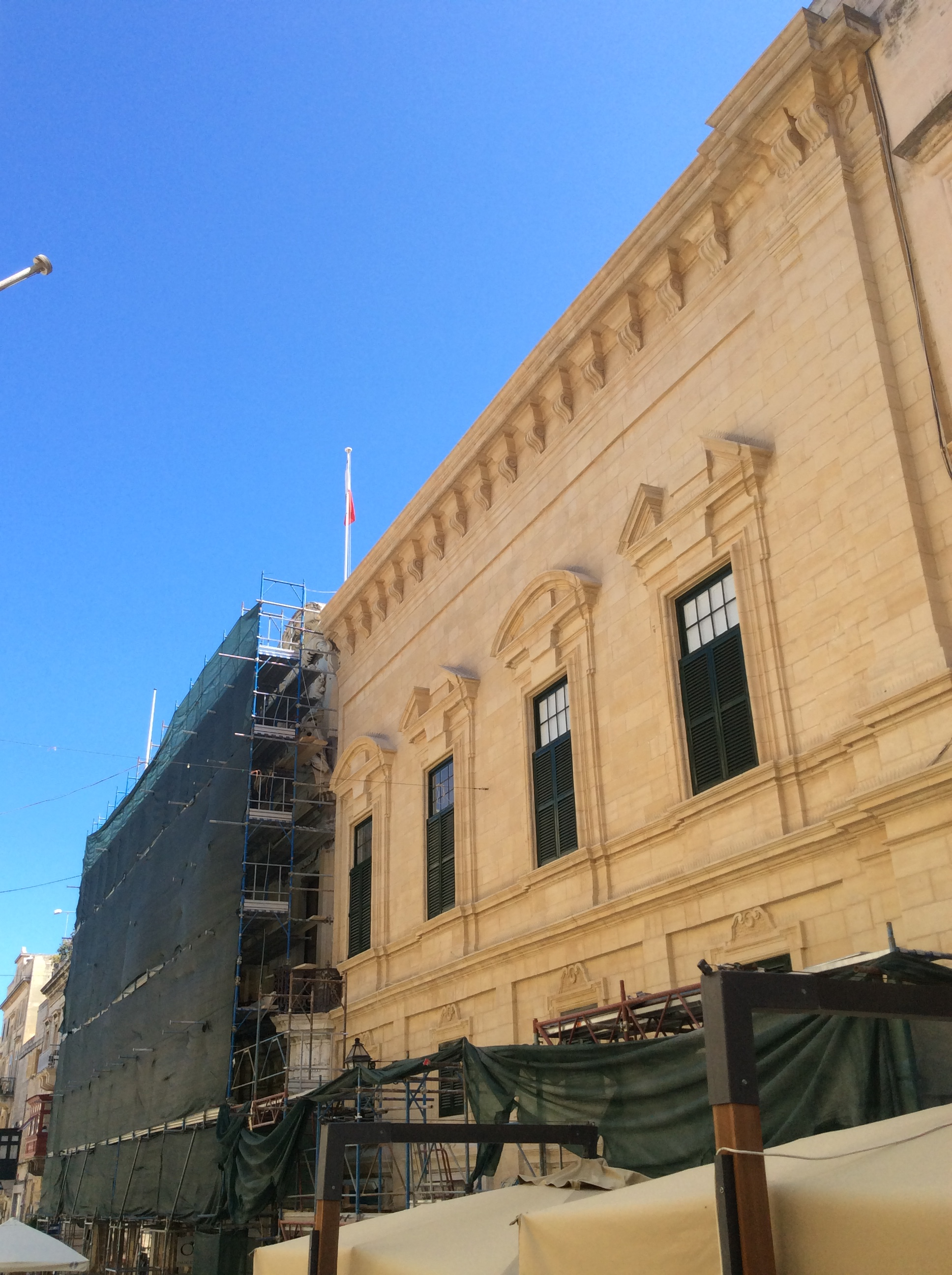
Restoration in process in September 2017

The laboratory on the Castellania's second floor, initially used by the Malta Fever Commission, was restored and converted into The Brucellosis Museum in 1980, and it is now open to the public by appointment.

During WWII, the Health Department dealt with several contagious illnesses attributed to the mass sharing of buildings and war shelters. The buildings close to the Castellania were hit by air bombings. The Castellania was damaged together with the next door Casa Dorell during one of the bombardments on 4 April 1942. The Castellania suffered damage on the side of the prison up to a fraction of the front façade.

Since the British period some of the prison cells were modified and converted into government offices, and currently still serve this purpose. Other parts of the Castellania's interior, including the chapel and one of the prison cells, were restored in the 1990s. The restored cell appears on the front cover of the book Kissing the Gallows: A Cultural History of Crime, Torture and Punishment in Malta, 1600–1798, authored by William Zammit. There were further plans to restore the façade in the late 1990s, but nothing materialized. The façade was again restored as part of a number of projects for Valletta 2018 – European Capital of Culture. A detailed study for the restoration of the façade took place, which gave the way to call for a public tender, and work began in June 2017. Works were completed in January 2018, in time for Valletta's inauguration as European Capital of Culture. Some sculpture of the façade have weathered or broke off during the years but were faithfully reconstructed during the restoration.

The building appears in a late 19th century photo, when the section on St. John Street was used to house the gas office, as well as shops on Merchant's Street. The photo forms part of the Richard Ellis collection, a set of images named for the photographer. The building appears in an early 20th century photo, with the photograph named as Castellania (Old Court-House), and appears on a British period postcard. By the late 19th century, calesse drivers were required to register their vehicles at the Castellania and obtain number plates.

In the early 20th century, Maltese socialist Manwel Dimech was imprisoned at the Castellania, unbeknownst to the public or his family, until the Governor of Malta exiled Dimech to Sicily on 5 September 1914. Despite pleas from high-ranking British officials, Dimech was refused permission to return to Malta. A plaque in the whereabouts of the Victoria Gate, where Dimech passed under before boarding a ship to Italy, commemorates his exile. The exile of Dimech remains widely remembered in Malta.

The building housed Malta's Public Health Department (id-Dipartiment tas-Saħħa Pubblika) from 1921 to 1998. As a consequence of the given Self-Government (1921–1934) a number of high-profile health decisions were taken. It was later decided to house the Ministry for Health, which has been known by a number of names throughout the years. The Ministry has been operating at the Castellania, after moving out from Casa Leoni in Santa Venera, since 7 October 1998. Under the remit of the Health Ministry, there are now around 6,000 workers operating around the country.

The ground floor hosts a number of shops which were intended in the original design to generate employment. The rest of the building is not normally open to the public, except for some special occasions such as the Notte Bianca event. The Richmond Foundation in Malta has used the Notte Bianca opportunity to disperse information about psychiatric conditions by setting a stand at the Castellania.

Since the 1990s on the feast of Saint Luke, at the discretion and budget of the Ministry, a reception is held at the building were high ranking medical officials are invited for a gathering. On 10 November 1995, the participants of the Malta Lithium Symposium from 18 different nationalities were hosted at the Castellania by Minister for Social Development, Louis Galea, to meet with government employees of different ministries and departments. In 2007, Minister Austin Gatt suggested the establishment of a museum of Maltese legal and political history in the building, but to date this is yet to materialise.

The Castellania serves as an authority for the permission of burials and the selling of government owned burial sites. Related to the matter, on 19 December 2017, numerous people were given an appointment on the same day which resulted in a crowding at the customer care section at the former prison's courtyard of the Castellania. Most clients were told to leave premises after being given another appointment.

In December 2019, messages related to Government corruption in Malta and the death of Daphne Caruana Galizia were left attached to the door of the Castellania, together with symbolic coal on the doorstep.

== Architecture ==
It is common for prestigious buildings in Valletta, such as the Castellania, to be used as government ministries. The Castellania is regarded as an iconic building in Maltese architecture. It is a historical and architectural landmark in Valletta, a World Heritage Site city. The highly decorated building differs from other nearby buildings, to an extent that may lack harmony in the street which is in.

=== Exterior ===
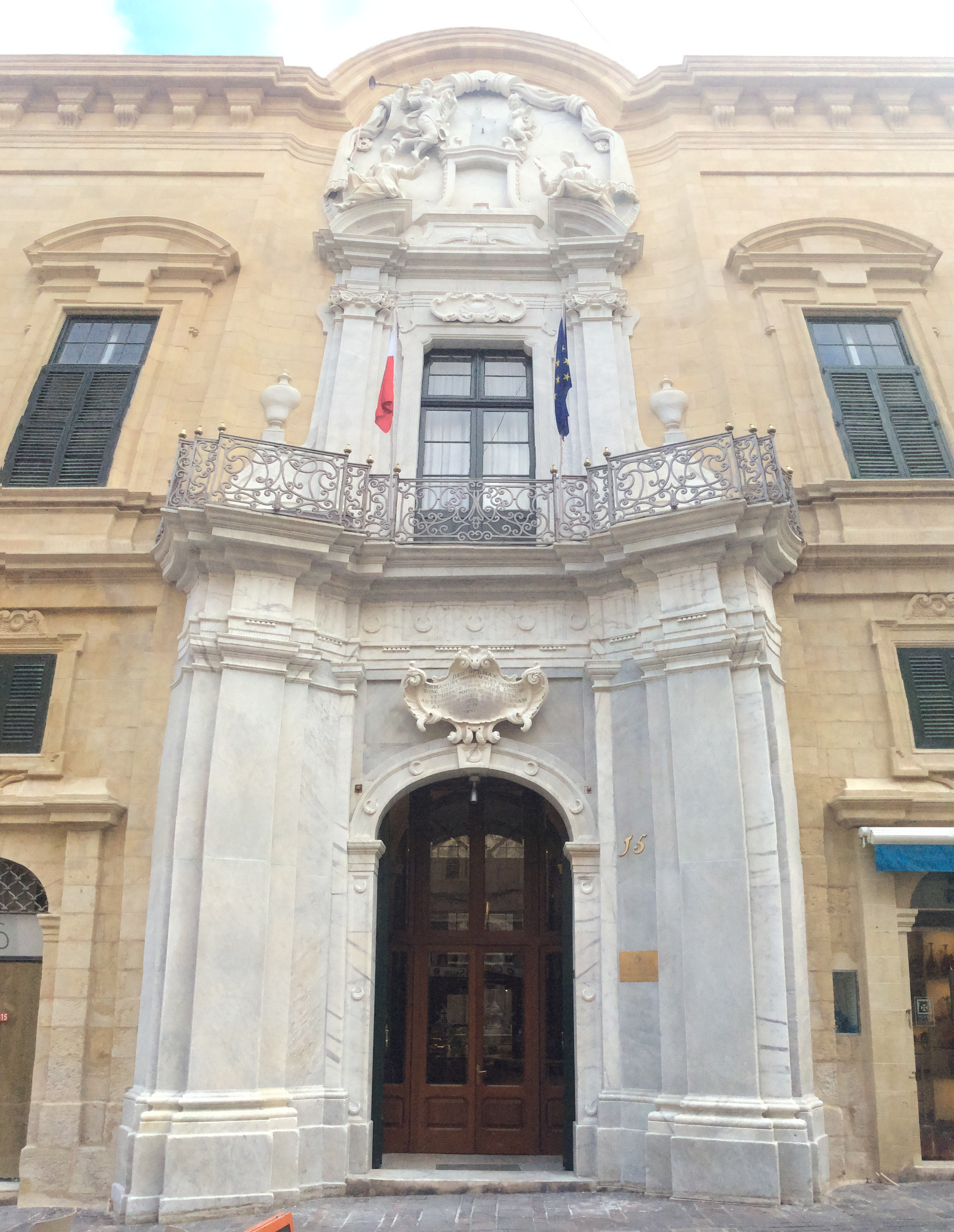
The ornate marble centrepiece

The Castellania is considered as the masterpiece of architecture projected by Grand Master Pinto, being the most original intact of secular High Baroque architecture and a relic of the early modern period, under the rule of the Order of St. John. It has an elaborate façade designed to be imposing, of similar proportions to an auberge, and it is a prominent building in the area. It is two stories high, being built on three sides of a central courtyard. Another small courtyard at the rear serves to increase natural light. Although the building has an asymmetrical plan, the main façade in Merchants Street is symmetrical. The design prominently includes sumptuous edges, spread over the exterior.

The main façade includes a distinctive portal, with a jotting out symmetric triple concave, and clustered pilasters, of which features are typical of Sicilian Baroque. (Note: Influence of Sicilian Baroque is evident. The style became popular in Malta in the 18th century replacing Roman Baroque, and there are comparisons with the building to the Sicilian Baroque Church of All Souls of Purgatory (Italian: Chiesa delle Anime del Purgatorio) in Trapani, Sicily (1688–1712).) Above the portico is a cornice and an iron-railed balcony which opens into the former criminal hall. Similar to other courts in Malta, the balcony was purposely used to read to the present public the major verdicts and newly introduced bandi. Heraldic crescents from Pinto's coat of arms decorate the main portal, and a cartouche with the following inscription is found beneath the balcony. It reads:

DEO OPT. MAX.

EMMANUEL PINTO M.M. ET PRINCEPS
HUNC UTRIUSQUE JUSTITIÆ LOCUM
VETUSTATE PROPE LABENTEM,
AD TERROREM POTIUS, QUAM AD POENAM
A FUNDAMENTIS, ÆRE PROPRIO
ANNI FERE SPATIO
RENOVAVIT AUXIT,
ORNAVIT
MDCCLVIII

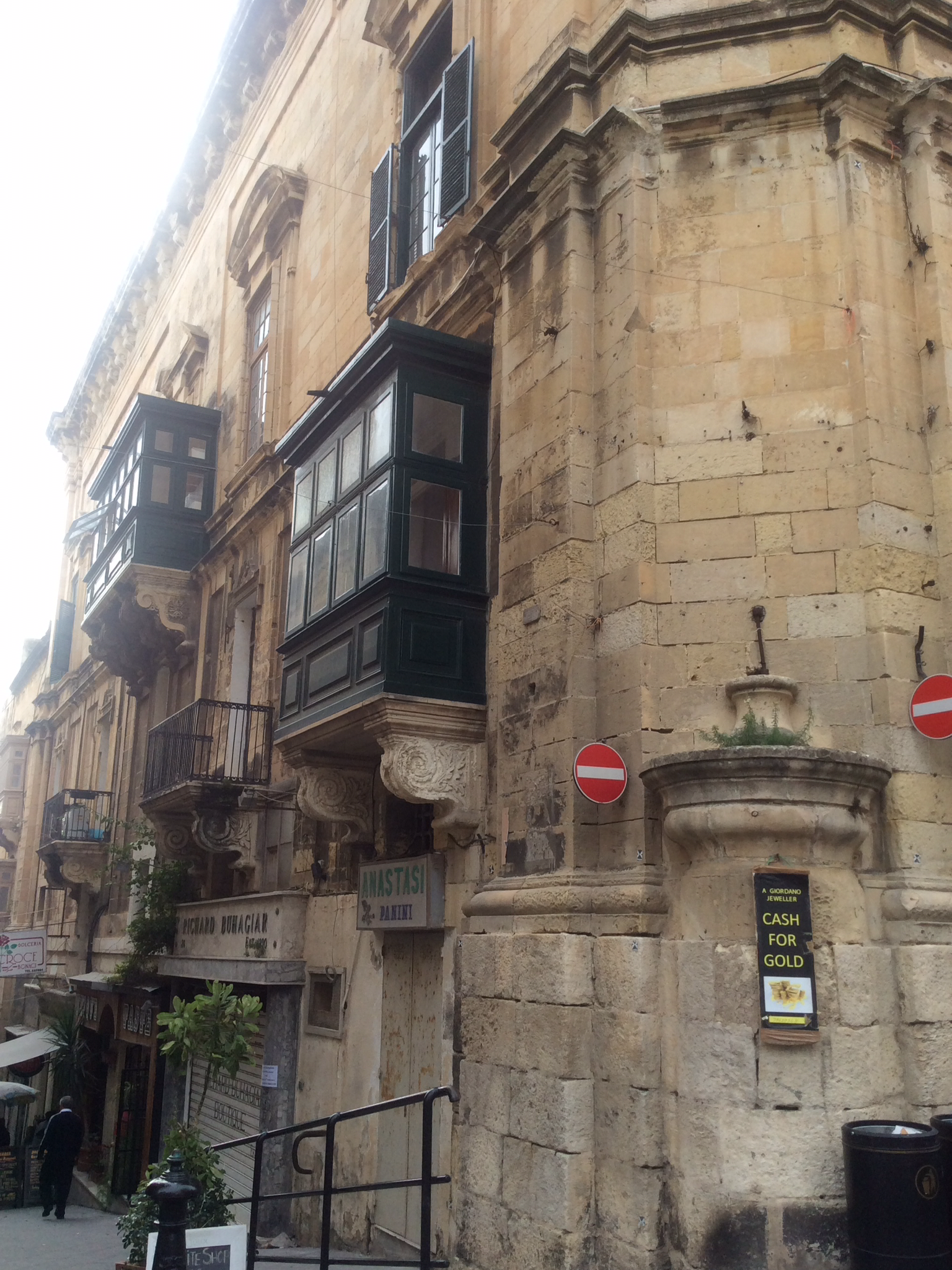
Side façade facing St. John's Street, with the pillory on the right. Nelson's Hook is also visible behind the railing.

The balcony is topped by a niche consisting of allegorical figures of Justice and Truth, as well as triumphal sculptures of a winged female figure and a putto. The latter sculptures represent fame. These sculptures are of high artistic value due to their symbolic details and fine work. Some parts of the sculptures, such as the scales held by Lady Justice, are now missing. The figures were designed to appear as being in style of movement and with dynamics.

The empty spaces between these figures contained Pinto's bust and coat of arms, but they were removed during the French occupation of Malta or in the early 19th century. It is not known how the bust of Pinto looked like, however it may have been either sculpted similar to the bust on the façade of Auberge de Castille or an original work. In either case it was probably made of bronze, and stood on a marble plinth which is still there. Similar to other busts of the time, it may have been the work of Jacques Saly. The triumphal figures are similar to those found on the 17th century funerary monument of Nicolas Cotoner sculpted by Domenico Guidi, but it is unknown who worked on the replica of the Castellania. A prominent continuous cornice runs along the building at roof level which is only interrupted by the central decorations.

The ground floor in Merchants Street was designed so as to house eight shops, four on each side of the main doorway. This lower façade is divided into eight bays, one for each shop, whereas it contrasts with the upper façade as it has no division between windows apart from the central decoration. Each shop has an interconnected room above, reached by an individual spiral staircase, which space was intended as a home for the owners. These rooms above the shops have a window each, forming eight square windows on the façade, one above each entrance of a shop. The windows are decorated with the symbolic crescents of Pinto. At one point, the space of one of the shops was converted to become accessible from the main building to be used as offices for the Ministry for Health. On the same street, the first floor has the same number of windows however are larger and with conspicuous window frames. Some of the hood moulds of the window moldings were chipped over the years until their renovation in 2018.

The side façade along St. John's Street is not as ornate as the main façade, and it contains a set of wooden and open balconies. The entrance to the Castellania's prison cells is located in the side façade. A number of shops are also found in this street, with differentiated elevation.

The building's corner between Merchants and St. John's streets contains a prominent niche-like corner with a cylindrical pedestal at the bottom which is about 3 m (9.8 ft) high. This originally served as a pillory, where prisoners would stand on it one at a time, and publicly humiliated. This also served as public entertainment, where anyone interested was allowed to throw foodstuff at the condemned such as throwing tomatoes and eggs. More serious offenders were whipped or tortured using the corda at this pillory. The corda was a rope tide to a wooden beam above the pillory and the other end used to tie the hands of the condemned who was lifted for torture. According to Eric Brockman, slaves were those often exposed to public whipping at the corner. However anybody was subject to the ill treatment, generally those who committed repeated offenses.

Torture remained a means to obtain information, including forced confession, by the civil courts throughout most of the eighteenth century despite it was opposed by the Bishop and by the Inquisitor. The Castellania made provisions to limit torture with the Code de Rohan when subjects were not to be tormented more than an hour. Word of mouth has it that an individual would have his debt paid when a third person or group would offer to pay it off if the bankrupt person undergoes the corda, serving as public entertainment. Those condemned to death often were subjected to endure torture and later hanged outside Valletta, in the whereabouts of the Bastion of St. Jacob. According to Louis de Boisgelin, the historian of the Order, amid the last three days of the Maltese carnival the locals used to recite a Roman tradition at the Castellany by dangling a stone above the pillory (instead of a human) and hit it which symbolised a temporal halt of punishment during those days.

A bent iron bar in the form of a hook is affixed into the wall of the Castellania, close to the pillory. According to tradition, the hook might have been used to lift the largest bell of the nearby St John's Co-Cathedral, but this is now regarded as unlikely. The hook was most probably used to secure prisoners to the Castellania's pillory. At the end of the rule of the Order of St John, Stefano Ittar drew a sketch of the building as it was at the time. In 1803, Horatio Nelson allegedly passed through the hook in a dare, and the hook became known as Nelson's Hook after the Battle of Trafalgar. It became a tradition for Royal Navy sailors to bet and buy drinks for shipmates who managed to pass through the hook. Junior officers allegedly had a good chance of promotion if they passed through the hook. Brockman further claims that the hook was used to lift a cage at the pillory, with a person condemned to stay inside for public ridicule, allegedly another type of public degradation. The hook by itself is a sought after landmark; it is often found marked on modern contemporary maps and included on tourists booklets.

=== Interior ===
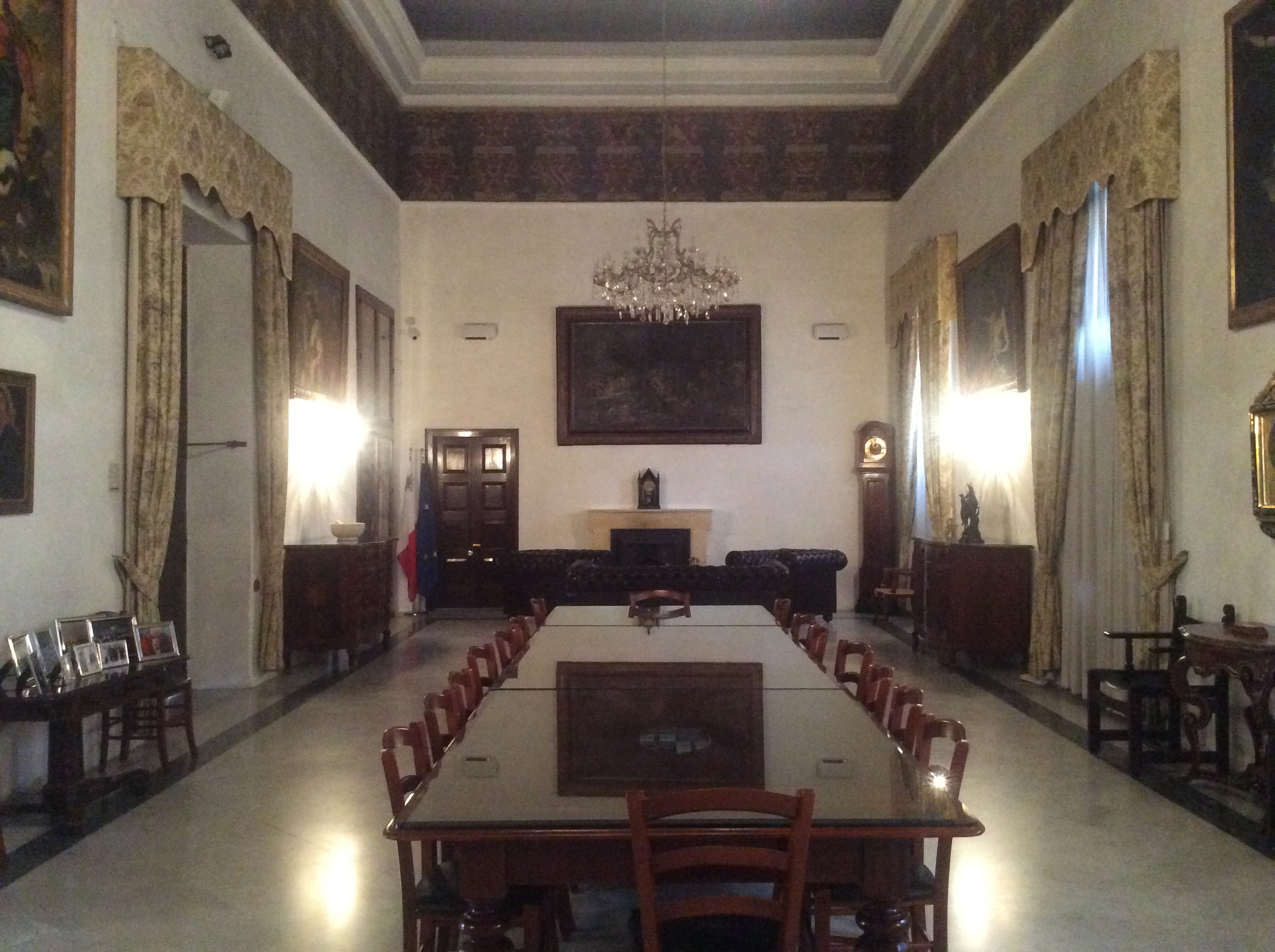
The former criminal court, originally known as the Aula Criminale della Gran Corte della Castellania.

The interior of the Castellania contains offices, court halls, a chapel and prison cells. A large allegorical statue representing Lady Justice or Astraea wearing a blindfold and holding weighing scales stands at the staircase which lead to the former courtrooms. (Note: The statue was likely named for Astraea during the knights period because of the figure of Astraea appearing on the belongings of the Togati della Gran Corte which was a militia established by Grand Master Perellos. However the same figure has since the British period also referred to as Lady Justice.) The statue stands on a pedestal, and its sculptor is unknown. The staircase is grandiose on its own.

The most decorated room in the building is the Sala Nobile (Noble Hall) on the first floor, which was originally a courthall, and which is now used as a meeting room. Here the judge and the nominated College of Advocates sat on a bench, which itself was a platform, wearing typical silk gown clothing of the period. The advocates on the bench were nominated and removed at the discretion of the Grand Master. When Malta was a British colony a similar short lived system was adopted, on 14 August 1832, known as the King's Counsel. The bench consisted of the Advocates of the King, and survived seven years. This room has coats-of-arms of the Castellani depicted on the upper side of the walls. There are 105 coats-of-arms, belonging to the Castellani from 1609 to the last in 1798, after which the position was abolished. In 1970 a copy of a painting by Mattia Preti, portraying two Saints of Health Cosmas and Damian, was transferred from St Luke's Hospital chapel to the hall at the Castellania.

An inscription, found on a cartouche, above the main door of the hall reads:

HIC SUNT CAUSIDICI HIC ROSTRA

HIC SUBSELLIA IUDIS
QUIS POSUIT. PINTI. ET PRINCIPIS
ÆQUUS AMOR
(meaning, Here are the law courts, the seat of lawyers and
pleaders, set up by Prince Pinto for his love of equity)

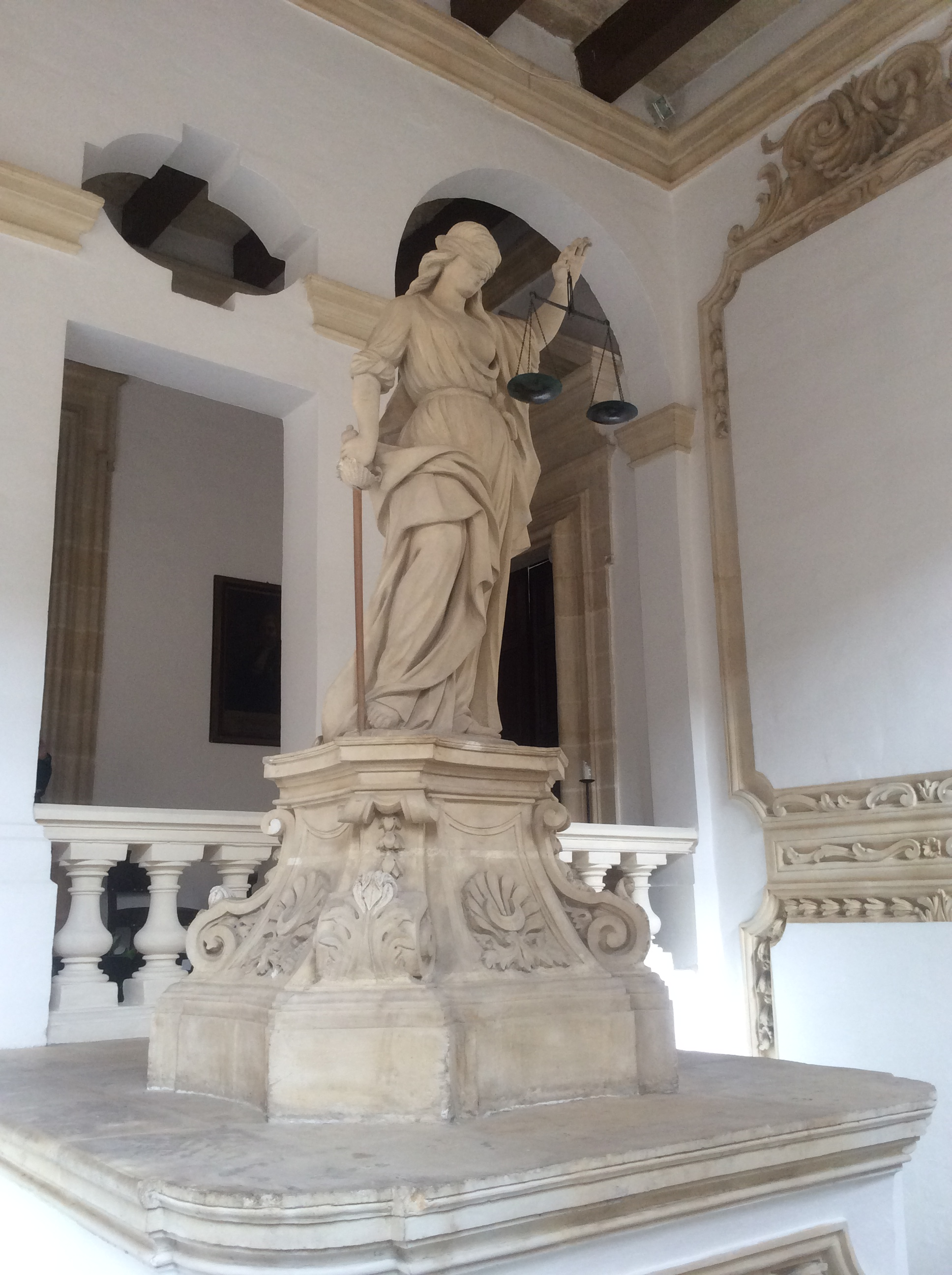
Statue of Lady Justice at the Castellania

The chapel was dedicated to Our Lady of Sorrows (also called the Madonna di Pietà or Mater Dolorosa). After being deconsecrated in the late 19th century, the room was used for other purposes, and only the limestone frame, where used to be the titular painting which was retrieved during restoration works in 1991, still remains from the chapel's original interior. An ornate fountain is located at the building's main courtyard, above which is a niche with a statue and above it an elaborate sculpture of the coat-of-arms of Pinto. Similar to the fountain of the first Castellania on site, it was supplied by water from the aqueduct.

A number of prison cells are found in the Castellania. The cells close to the court rooms hosted new cases and also those awaiting execution. Several other cells are located at the rear of the building, and they are surrounded by a courtyard. These cells generally housed inmates serving a short sentence of less than eight days, usually due to unpaid rent or accumulated debts. Other convicts were those who refused to bake bread in Valletta, who were jailed for a roughly a week and those found guilty of stealing to eat despite their social situation which were imprisoned up to three months. Women in Malta were commonly arrested for the latter and other offenses; in a 1776 criminal court case against Margerita Crocco who supposedly stole a hen and which she claimed to have found it outside her home was not found credible in her versions of events due to her suffering hunger and was sentenced to three months in the prison of the same courthouse. In some cases, individuals were imprisoned for not observing religious norms, such as eating meat on prohibited days. Prisoners with longer sentences were usually sent to other prisons, usually the Gran Prigione, and if in physical capability were subject to be sent to the galleys. Medical physicians were requested to visit the inmates in the prison when needed for multiple reasons related to their health and examinations. There were attempts to re-criminalize gambling during the late magistracy of Pinto as such activity led to undesirable financial consequences to participants but the widespread practice was instead strictly regulated, on fears that if banned it may be of benefit to the underground community.

The minor inmates at the Castellania were the ones who took care of the general maintenance, cleaning and repair works of the building, while guards were responsible for the allocation of tasks and observing their performance. Some historical graffiti made by prisoners can be found at the courtyard of the prison. Significant graffiti are also found in one of the most secure cells upstairs. At the underground are the dungeons, which are described as an unpleasant place to stay. By the early 19th century, arrested females awaiting a court decision started to be sent to the women's prison at Corradino (now a police station) rather than accommodated at the Castellania.

The building has a direct passage to a WWII air-raid shelter from a small room at the small courtyard, which was excavated in the early 20th century.

=== Architecture and cultural heritage ===
The building was included on the Antiquities List of 1925, as La Castellania. It has been a Grade 1 scheduled property since 1992, and it is listed on the National Inventory of the Cultural Property of the Maltese Islands. The court documents, of the Magna Curia Castellania (MCC), are now stored and conserved at the Banca Giuratale in Mdina. The documents form part of the National Archives of Malta and are used by historians as primary sources to research about Malta during the knights of St. John. The archives of the Acta Originalia of the Magna Curia Castellania (AOM) include 1,411 volumes, dating from the early years of the rule of the knights.

== Legacy ==
The building was colloquially referred to in Maltese as il-Kistlanija (also il-Klistanija, read as yl Klystlani'a). It inspired the saying għandu wiċċ l-għatba tal-Kistlanija, which is translated as "he has the face of the Castellania's doorstep". This referred to a shameless person showing few or no expressions. The expression Castellania's doorstep was also used to imply equality in the application of law.

=== Commemorative coins ===
La Castellania was depicted on two commemorative coins minted in 2009 by the Central Bank of Malta. The coins show part of the building's façade on the reverse and the coat of arms of Malta on the obverse.

== See also ==
- Diritto Municipale

== Bibliography ==
- Buttigieg, Emanuel (2010). "Family life and neighbourliness in Malta (c.1640- c.1760): Some preliminary observations based on evidence from the Magna Curia Castellanire" (PDF). Arkivju: Journal of the National Archives of Malta and the Friends of the National Archives of Malta (1): 51. ISSN 2219-9888. OCLC 892395497.
- Cassar, Paul (1988). The Castellania Palace: From Law Courts to Guardian of the Nation's Health. Malta: Department of Information. OCLC 223304919. Archived from the original on 25 May 2020.
