= Our Saviour's Church, Lija =

Our Saviour's Church
- Parish church of the Transfiguration of Jesus
- Il-Knisja Parrokkjali tas-Salvatur
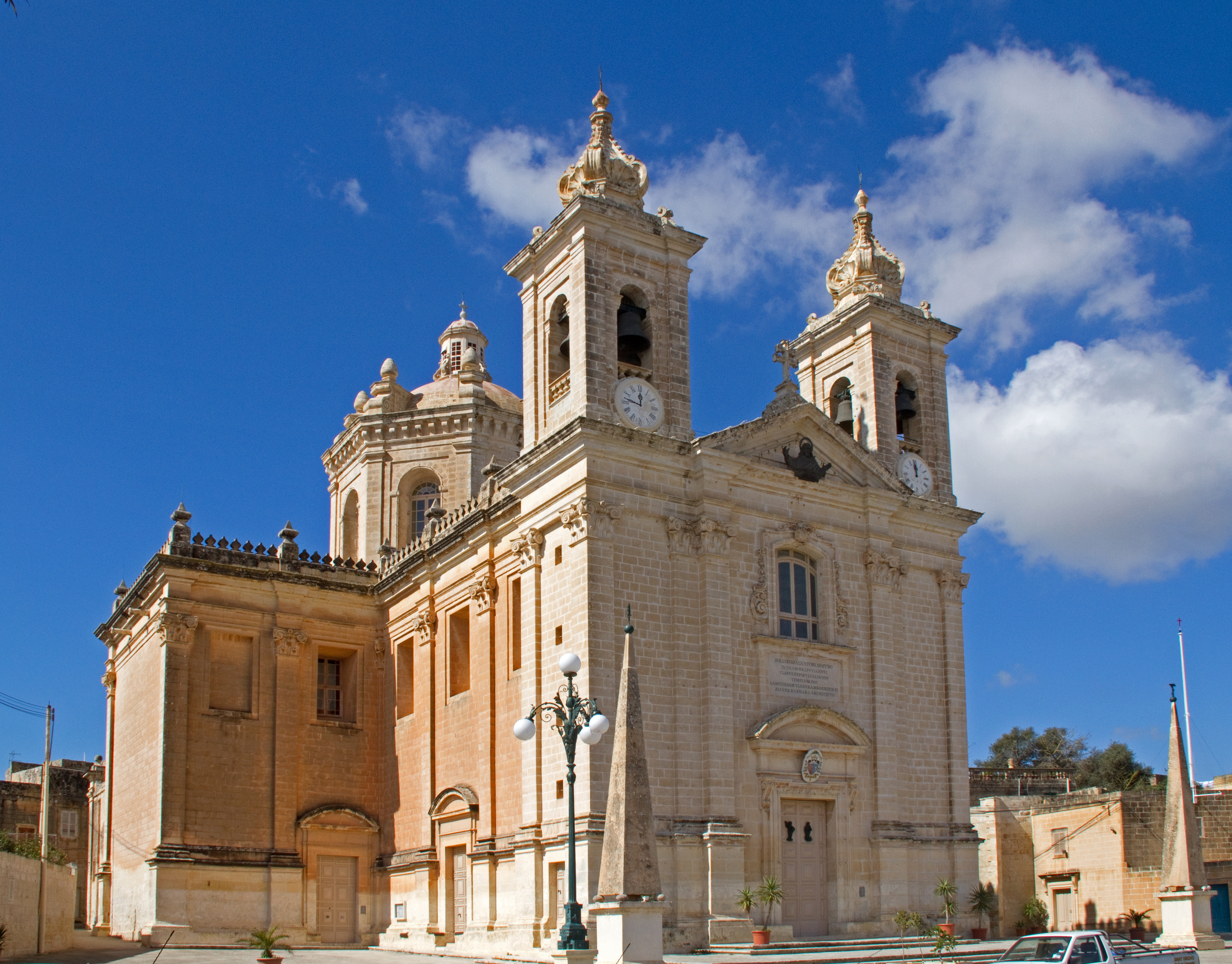
- Our Saviour's Church
- 35°54′05.8″N 14°26′47.6″E
- Location: Lija, Malta
- Denomination: Roman Catholic

History
- Status: Active
- Dedication: Transfiguration of Jesus
- Consecrated: 25 July 1782

Architecture
- Functional status: Parish church
- Architect: Giovanni Barbara
- Architectural type: Church
- Style: Baroque

Specifications
- Materials: Limestone

Administration
- Archdiocese: Malta
- Parish: Lija

Our Saviour's Church or more formally The Parish Church of the Transfiguration of Jesus is a Roman Catholic Baroque Parish church located in the village of Lija, Malta.

== History ==
The parish of Lija was created on February 6, 1594. The cornerstone for the church was laid by Bishop Davide Cocco Palmieri on May 20, 1694. The church was built on designs made by Giovanni Barbara and was finished by July 1702. The church was completely finished in 1782 and blessed by Bishop Vincenzo Labini on July 25, 1782.

== Interior ==
The interior of the church is modelled on the Tuscan order with traces of Doric order. The titular painting depicts the Transfiguration of Jesus and is the work of Mattia Preti dating from 1698. The same artist also painted two works depicting St Luke and St Matthew, respectively. Other notable works include Our Lady of the Rosary by Alessio Erardi dating from 1702. There are also works by Francesco Zahra depicting the Guardian Angels dating from 1757. Giuseppe Hyzler painted Our lady of Mount Carmel in the mid 19th century. One can also find a painting of the Holy Cross by Giuseppe Calì dating from 1891. Other artists such as Giuseppe D'Arena, Lazzru Pisani and Giuseppe Calleja. The paintings in the apse are the work of Ignazio Cortis dating from 1873 while that on the ceiling and the dome are the work of Giuseppe Cali.
