= St Augustine Church, Valletta =

Parish Church of St Augustine
- Il-Knisja ta' Sant' Wistin
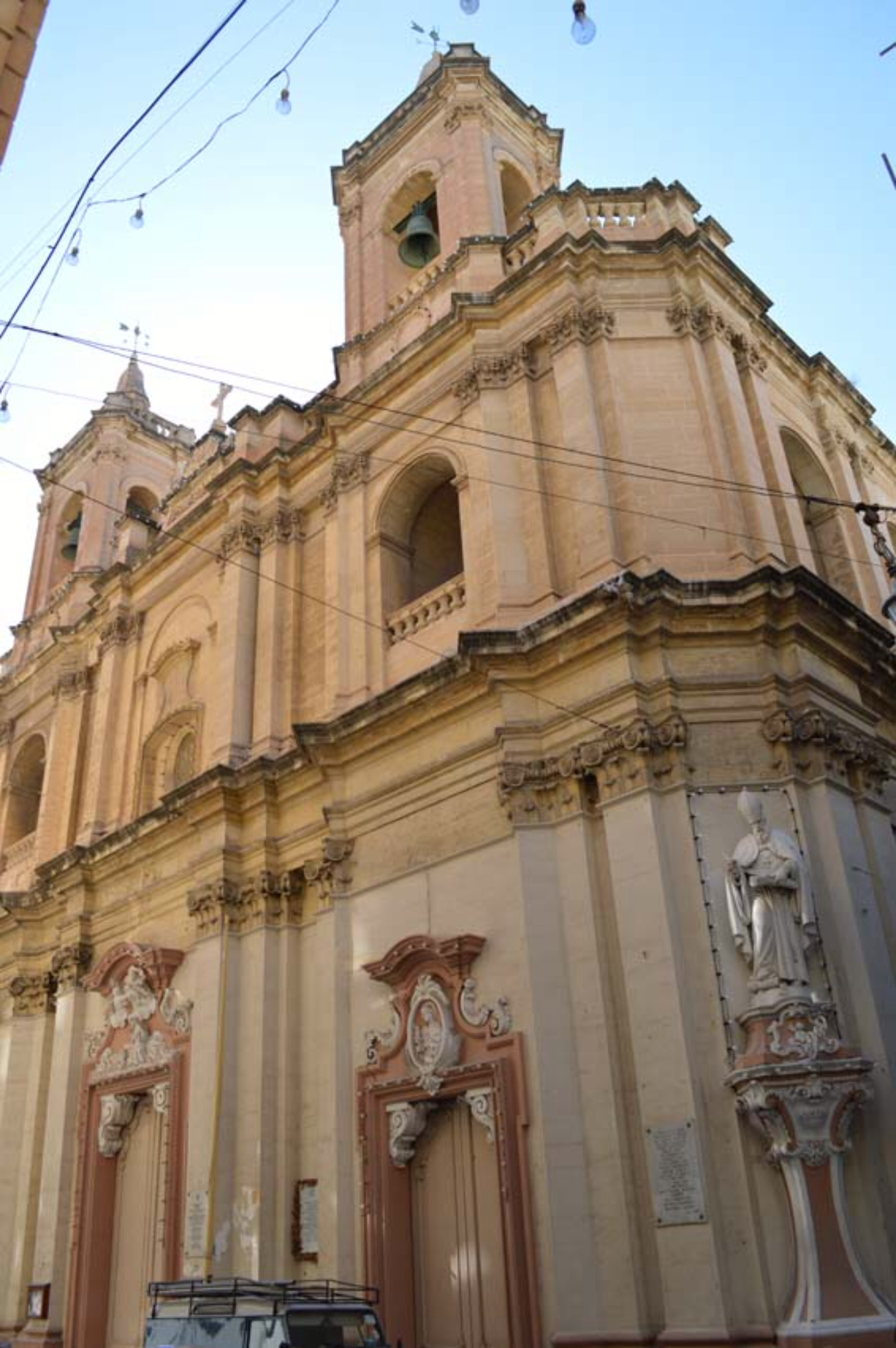
- Parish Church of St Augustine
- 35°53′55″N 14°30′39″E
- Location: Valletta, Malta
- Denomination: Roman Catholic
- Website: Website of the Church

History
- Status: Active
- Founded: May 10, 1571
- Dedication: St Augustine of Hippo
- Consecrated: 1 July 1906

Architecture
- Functional status: Parish church
- Architect(s): Girolamo Cassar Original church Giuseppe Bonici Present church
- Architectural type: Church
- Style: Baroque
- Completed: 1794

Specifications
- Materials: Limestone

Administration
- Archdiocese: Malta
- Parish: Valletta

Clergy
- Rector: Deo Debono

St Augustine Church (Maltese: il-Knisja ta' Santu Wistin) is one of the churches built during the creation of the new city of Valletta, Malta.

== Description ==
The foundation stone was laid in 1571 according to the plan and guidance of Girolamo Cassar, architect of the Knights of St John. The church was rebuilt in 1765 according to a plan of Giuseppe Bonici. It was elevated to a parish church in 1968. St Augustine Hall, adjacent to the church, is part of the original plan of Cassar. The present church was consecrated by Giovanni Maria Camilleri on 1 July 1906.

A number of the artefacts found inside the church are originals from the first church. One of these is an important sixteenth-century painting of the Augustinian Nicholas of Tolentino depicted by the artist Mattia Preti. This is found in the chapel of the same saint.

In the first chapel to the left, there is a painting of the Augustinian John of Sahagun who was born in Spain in 1430. It is from the school of Preti and some of its figures can be found depicted on the ceiling of St John's Co-Cathedral in Valletta. Beneath it there is a small painting of Our Lady of Grace, undated and unsigned, also from the first church.

The church is renowned for the statue of St. Rita. Her feast is celebrated in May with a procession with her statue in the streets of Valletta.

The church building is listed on the National Inventory of the Cultural Property of the Maltese Islands.

== See also ==
- Culture of Malta
- History of Malta
- List of Churches in Malta
- Religion in Malta
