= Francesco Zerafa =

Maltese architect (1679–1758)

Francesco "Franco" Zerafa (Maltese: Franġisk Zerafa, 1679 – 21 April 1758) was a Maltese architect and donato to the Religion. In 1714, he succeeded Giovanni Barbara as Capomastro delle Opere della Religione, a post which he held until his death.

== Works ==
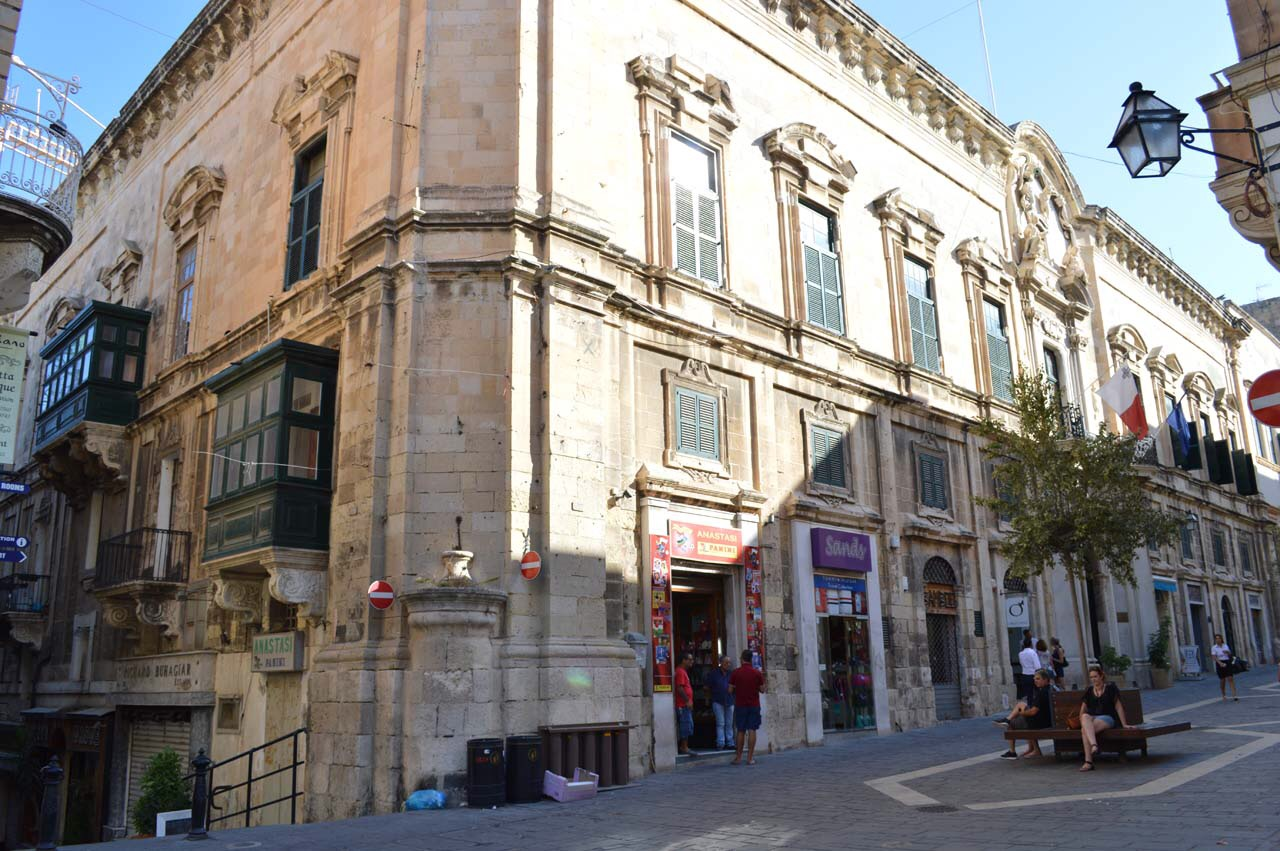
The Castellania in Valletta, which was designed by Zerafa shortly before his death. It was completed under the direction of Giuseppe Bonici.

He assisted Charles François de Mondion in the designs of Fort Manoel, and was responsible for major decorative additions at the palace of the Grand Master during the reign of Zondadari. He was involved in the decisions over the façade of the Church of St Catherine of the Italian Langue which was designed by Carrapecchia but disputed by then Capomastro Barbara - to later take his role as Capomastro delle Opere della Religione (the principal architect of the Order of St. John) in 1714. Together with Antonio Azzopardi, he oversaw the construction of the Manoel Theatre to designs of Romano Carapecchia in 1731–32.

He was one of few local architects, along Bonici and Barbara, who took a leading role in changing the local attitude from the vernacular housing to an elegant European design.

Zerafa was involved in several other public projects in the eighteenth century. Among which public works he designed windmills. In 1757 he designed the Castellania in Valletta, but he died on 21 April 1758 before the building was completed. He was succeeded as Capomastro delle Opere by Giuseppe Bonici, who oversaw the construction of the Castellania until it was completed in 1760.
