= Giovanni Barbara =

Maltese architect (1642–1728)

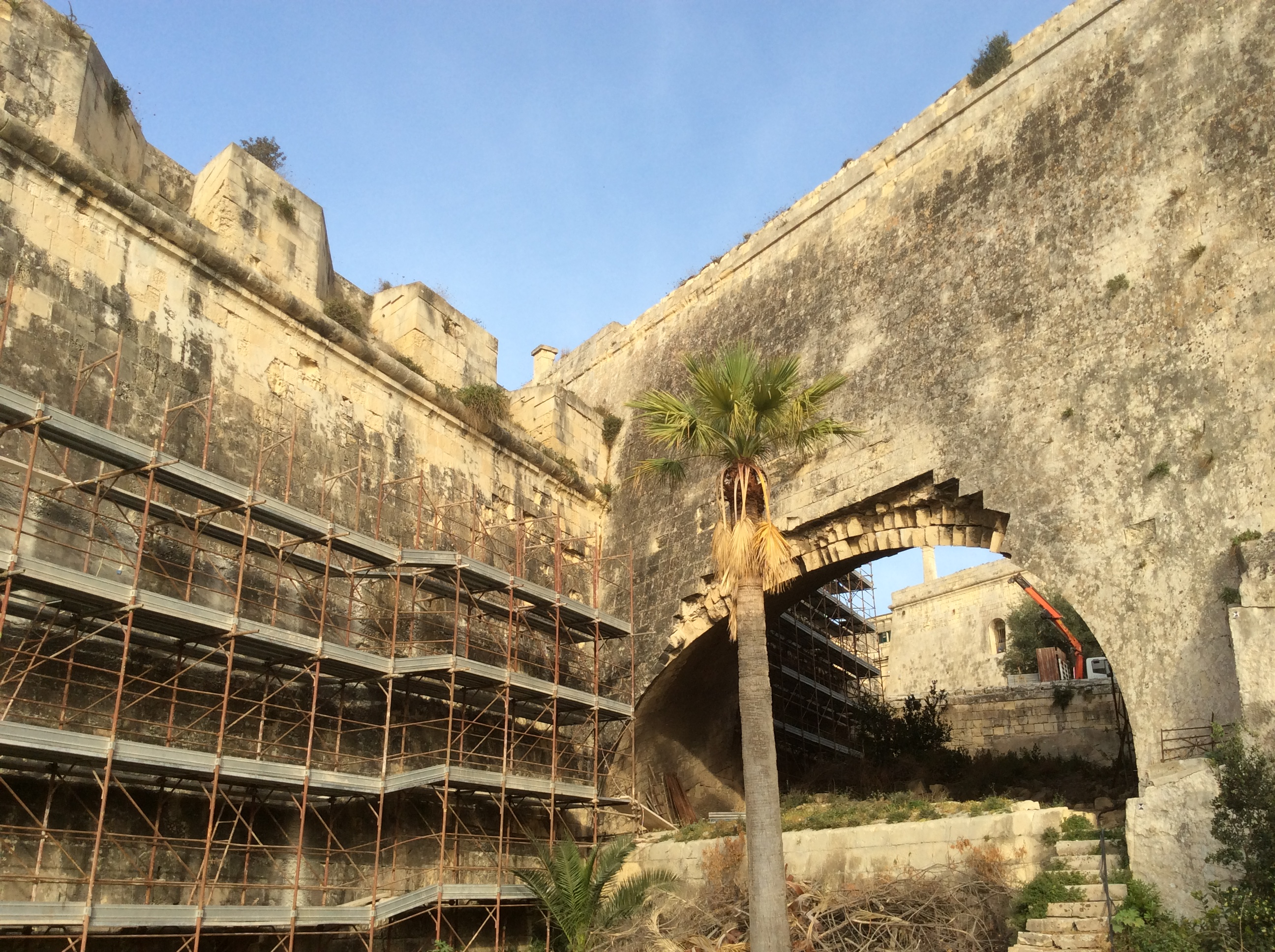
Barbara's skew arch at Sa Maison. It was damaged during WWII, then left decaying, and renovated between 2018 and 2019.

Giovanni Barbara (1642–1728) was a Maltese architect and military engineer. He was born in the town of Lija. He was Capomastro delle Opere della Religione, the principal architect of the Order of St. John, from 1681 until Francesco Zerafa became his assistant in 1714 and eventually succeeded him.

== Biography ==
In 1685 it was decided to build a new parish church for Lija. The town's parish priest, Don Anton Camillieri, invited Barbara and Lorenzo Gafà to prepare designs for the church, and Barbara's design was chosen. The church would be completed during the 18th century. He designed a skew arch at Sa Maison in Floriana, which was a marvel of construction and became known as the arco Barbara.

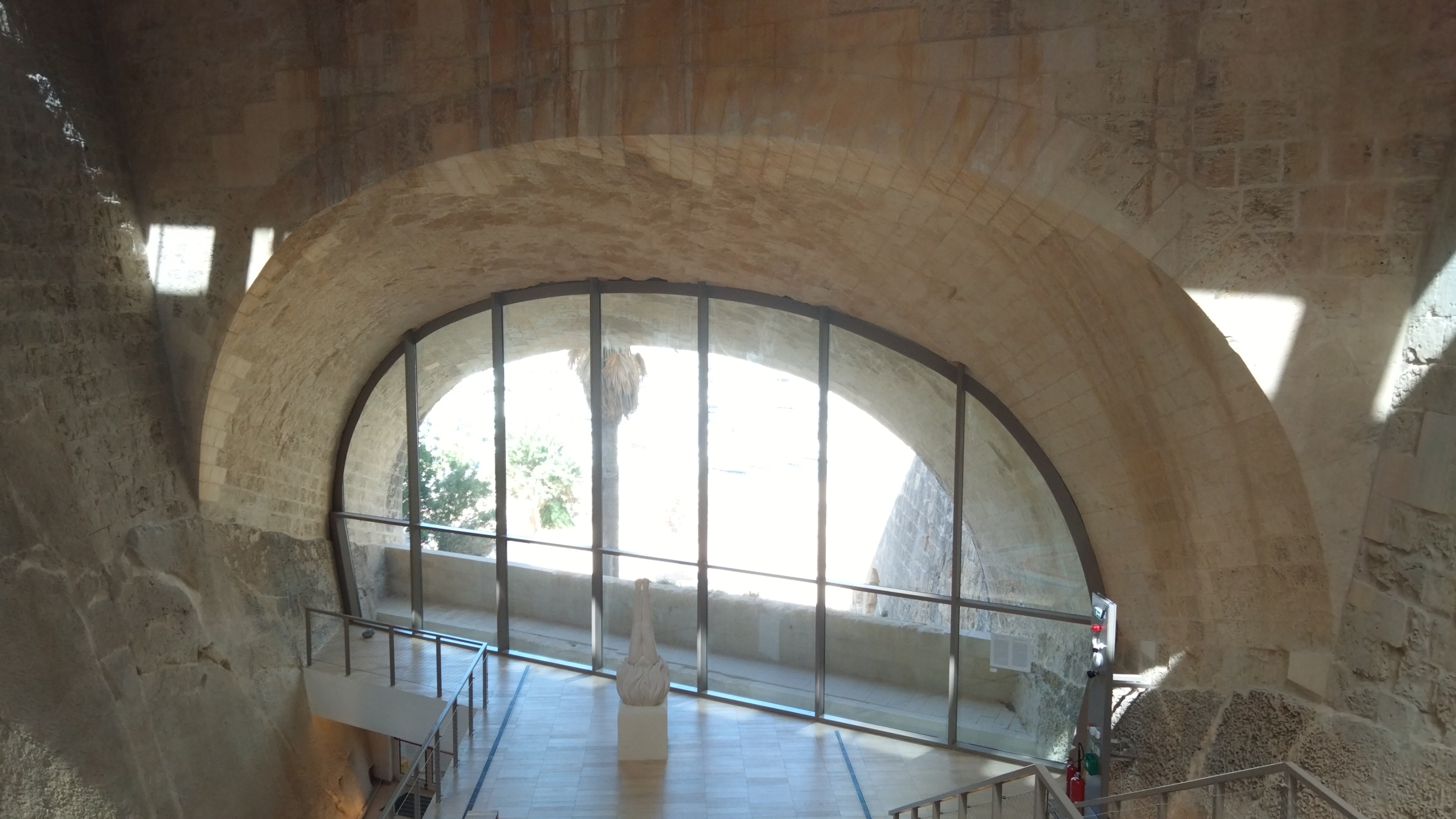
Barbara arch in 2025

This was built as part of the Floriana Lines fortifications, and it was completed in 1726. Several other buildings, such as the Church of St. James in Valletta, and Palazzo Vilhena and the Seminary in Mdina, are sometimes also attributed to Barbara. There is no proof about these claims and they were most likely designed by other architects. The Mdina Seminary was completed in 1740, around ten years after the death of Barbara.

Barbara died in 1728 and was buried in the Lija parish church.
