= Diritto Municipale =

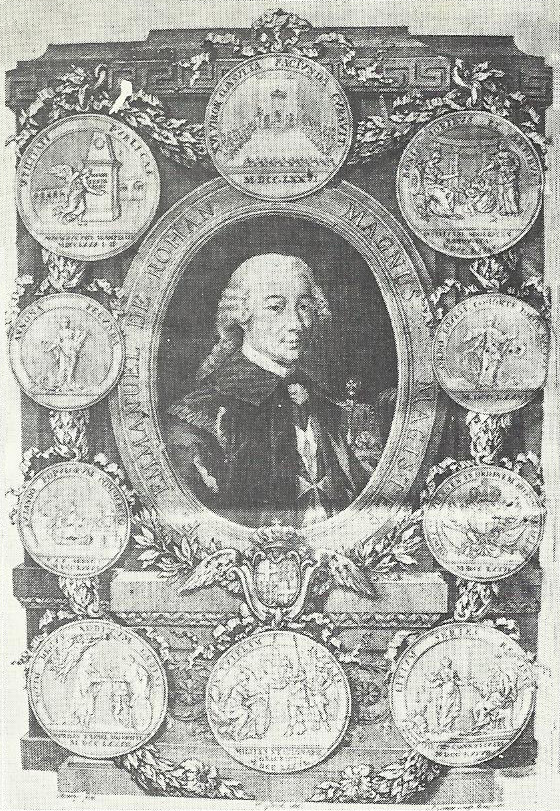
Front cover of the Diritto Municipale, showing Grand Master Emmanuel de Rohan

The Diritto Municipale (English: Municipal Law) was a compilation of the Hospitallers' and Malta's laws during their stay on the Island. It was commissioned by Grand Master Emmanuel de Rohan-Polduc in 1781 and completed in 1784. This is one of the more humane set of laws ever compiled by the Order, in keeping with the enlightened ideology sweeping all around Europe at the time.

== History ==
In 1781, Grandmaster Emmanuel de Rohan-Polduc assigned the creation of this Code of Laws to a Neapolitan lawyer, Giandonato Rogadeo whom had previously successfully defended the Order from lawsuits that it had gotten from Naples. Rogadeo, however was arrogant, looking down on and ignoring all of the suggestions given by the Maltese lawyers and judges. This caused it to be negatively judged as it was not well-suited for Malta's customs. Rohan, taken aback by the verdict, appointed another commission made up mainly of members of the Order. This resulted to the members of the commission having the same opinion as the Maltese. Rogadeo, affronted, asked for permission to leave Malta. The task was therefore forwarded to a Maltese lawyer Federico Gatt who devised the new code of laws. On 23 December 1782 a new council was set up, to revise the finished product. The council approved of it with minor alterations. It was ultimately disseminated on 17 July 1784.

== Contents of the Diritto Municipale ==
The Diritto Municipale is divided into seven books, as follows;

- The first book treats the Gran Corte della Castellania (introduced to Malta in 1530 by Grand Master Philippe Villiers de L'Isle-Adam). It defines the jurisdictions of the Court, jurisdictions of the public tribunals, duties of the Castellano, duties of the judges and of the other officers of the court.
- The second book is made up of five chapters and contain how criminal and civil lawsuits are to be treated.
- The third book contains how mortgages, obligations and contracts are to be treated.
- The fourth book revolves around will and successional issues and duties.
- The fifth book, having nine chapters, deals with the criminal laws. Also to note, the opening mentions the beggars and the indolent, which is the first mention of that social class in Malta's laws.
- The sixth book decrees laws to be followed concerning maritime commerce, armaments, the different grades making up the crew, amongst others. Beyond Chapter fourteen of this book, hostile activities of ships directly or indirectly under the authority of the Order.
- The seventh and finally book, as its name Miscellanea applies, deals with the other regulations which could not be included in the other books. These are tackled in appendices and single chapters.
