= Bishop's Palace, Birgu =

Bishop's Palace
- Il-Palazz tal-Isqof
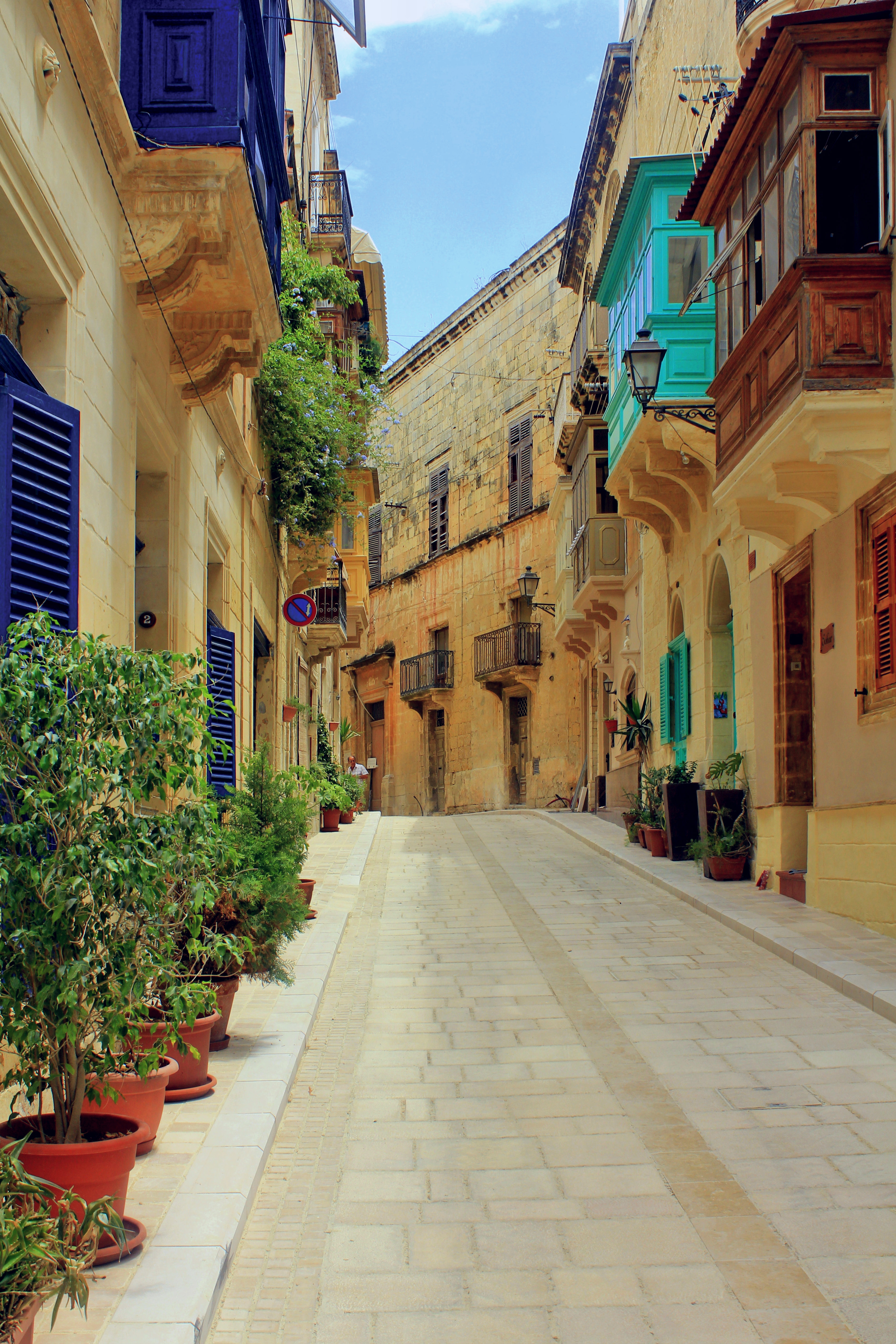
- The Bishop's Palace in 2014
- Interactive map of the Bishop's Palace area

General information
- Status: Intact
- Type: Palace
- Location: Birgu, Malta
- Coordinates: 35°53′14.1″N 14°31′24.4″E
- Completed: 16th century
- Renovated: 17th century

Technical details
- Material: Limestone

The Bishop's Palace (Maltese: Il-Palazz tal-Isqof) is a palatial building in Birgu, Malta which was a residence of the Roman Catholic Bishops of Malta. It was constructed in the 16th century.

== History ==
The building which later became known as the Bishop's Palace was originally built in around the 16th century. It belonged to the Abela family (ancestors of Giovanni Francesco Abela) until it was purchased by Bishop Domenico Cubelles in 1542. Apart from being a residence for the Bishop, the building also housed the Curia and an ecclesiastical tribunal. A prison where detainees awaiting trial or serving sentences handed out by the Bishop's court was also located in an adjacent annex.

After Valletta replaced Birgu as Malta's capital city in the 1570s, the Curia initially remained in the Birgu palace as Malta's Hospitaller rulers were against moving the Bishop's seat to the new city. The palace was modified by Baldassare Cagliares who was Bishop from 1615 to 1633, but during his episcopate he also constructed a new Bishop's Palace in Valletta and the Curia finally moved out of Birgu. Cagliares was therefore the last Bishop who resided within the Birgu palace.

The building remained property of the Curia and it was sometimes used by later Bishops during pastoral visits. It was further enlarged later on in the 17th century during the episcopate of Bishop Miguel Juan Balaguer. At some points it was rented out as a tenement, and for some time it housed a children's school until falling into disuse by the early 21st century.

The building is now listed on the National Inventory of the Cultural Property of the Maltese Islands.

== Architecture ==
The building's façade has a distinctive 16th century style, and it is believed to retain its original configuration.

== See also ==
- Archbishop's Palace, Mdina
- Archbishop's Palace, Valletta
