= Sylvain de Bosredon =

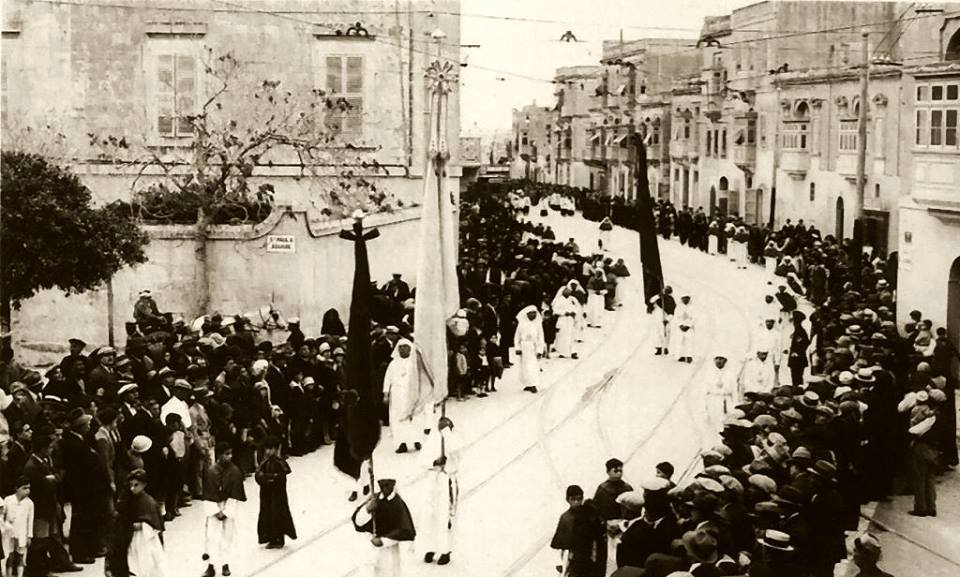
Casa Blacas in Ħamrun (left), 1920s

Fra Sylvain de Bosredon (15 September 1756 – 4 September 1798) was a French nobleman, Hospitaller knight and landscape artist who was executed by Maltese rebels during an insurrection against the French occupation of Malta in 1798.

Sylvain de Bosredon was born to François de Bosredon and Marie-Anne de Chauvigny de Blot in 1756. Following family tradition, he joined the Order of St John in Hospitaller Malta and was professed a knight of the Langue of Auvergne on 23 December 1778. De Bosredon performed administrative duties for the Hospitallers, and he was knowledgeable in the Order's statutory law and worked as a procurator for the Langue of Auvergne. He was also an artist who mainly painted landscapes in a late Baroque style with some hints of realism. During the 1780s, he went on a tour of Calabria, Lipari and Sicily along with fellow Hospitaller knight and geologist Fra Déodat Gratet de Dolomieu, painting many landscapes in the process.

In 1790, de Bosredon rented a country house known as Casa Blacas located a couple of miles outside the Hospitallers' capital of Valletta, Malta. When French revolutionary forces took over Malta from the Hospitallers in June 1798, de Dolomieu attempted to convince de Bosredon to accompany him on Napoleon's Egyptian campaign, but de Bosredon opted to remain in French-occupied Malta due to health issues.

On 2 September 1798, the Maltese rebelled against the occupation, and two days later a group of rebels arrived at Casa Blacas and accused the knight of being a collaborator. De Bosredon had reportedly been passing on information about insurgent activity to his uncle Jean de Bosredon de Ransijat, a Hospitaller knight who occupied a senior position within the French occupation government.

Sylvain de Bosredon was subsequently executed by the rebels in an act of extrajudicial punishment. According to Count Saverio Marchese, "his skull was cleft in two with a mattock like a melon without any ceremony and more according to the usage of war, and was immediately buried in the clothes he was wearing in a shallow grave at the main door of the villa of the garden near the two columns. A very sad but inevitable occurrence during the furor of the insurrection against the conspirator."

Some of de Bosredon's artworks are now preserved at the Mdina Cathedral Museum.
