= Old Church of Siġġiewi =

- Parish Church of St Nicholas
- Il-Knisja l-Qadima tas-Siġġiewi
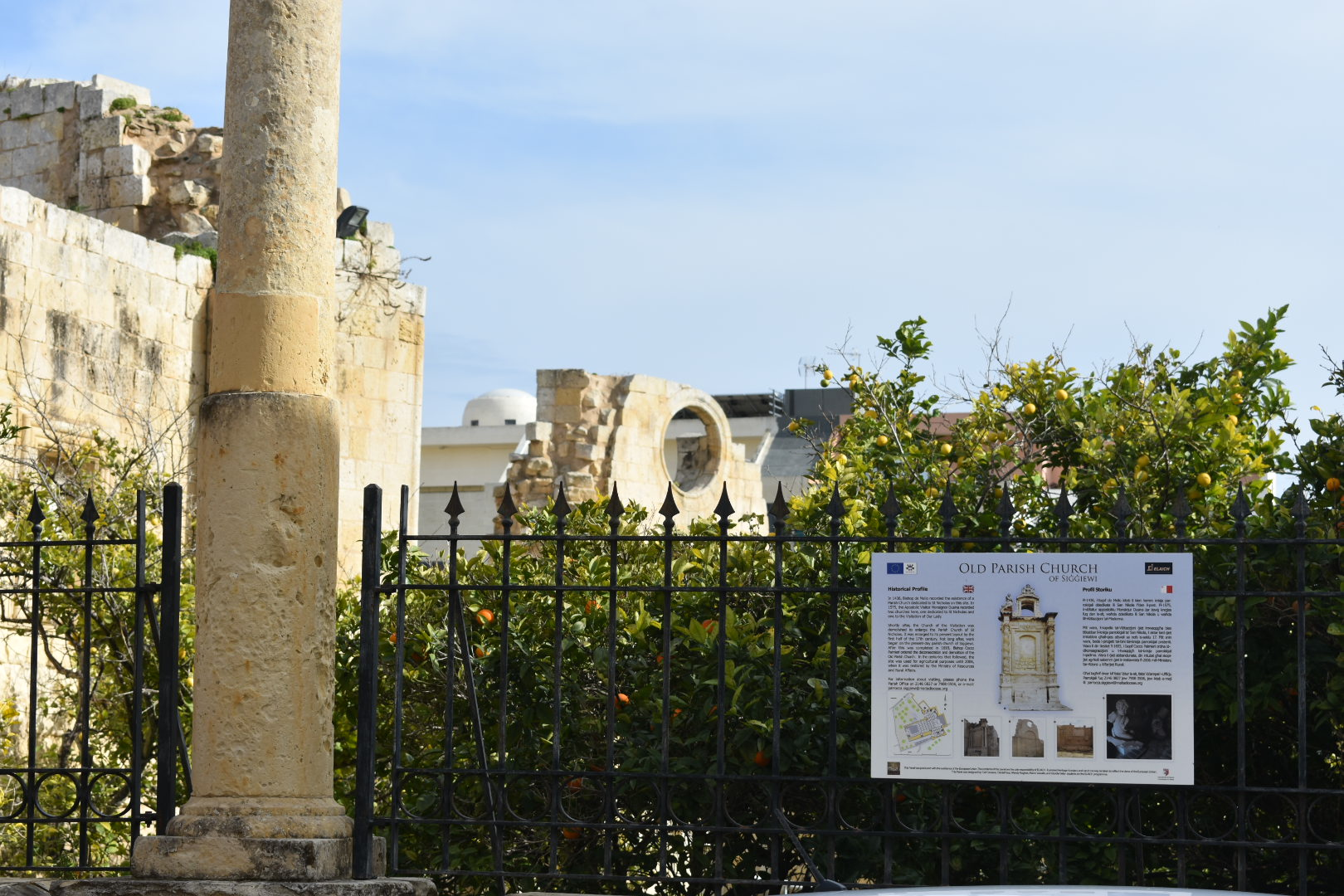
- Ruins of the southern transept in the background
- Old Church of Siġġiewi
- 35°51′06.1″N 14°26′15.5″E
- Location: Siġġiewi, Malta
- Denomination: Roman Catholic

History
- Status: Parish church
- Dedication: Saint Nicholas

Architecture
- Functional status: Ruins
- Style: Baroque (after 17th century alterations)
- Years built: 15th–17th centuries
- Demolished: Late 17th century

Specifications
- Materials: Limestone

Administration
- Diocese: Malta

The Old Church of Siġġiewi (Maltese: Il-Knisja l-Qadima tas-Siġġiewi) is a ruined Roman Catholic parish church in Siġġiewi, Malta, which was dedicated to Saint Nicholas. It was constructed in the 15th century after the village became a parish, and it was enlarged and embellished a number of times in the 16th and 17th centuries. The building was abandoned and partially demolished after a new parish church with the same dedication was built elsewhere in the village in the late 17th century. The ruins were abandoned and used for agricultural purposes until they were restored in 2007.

== History ==
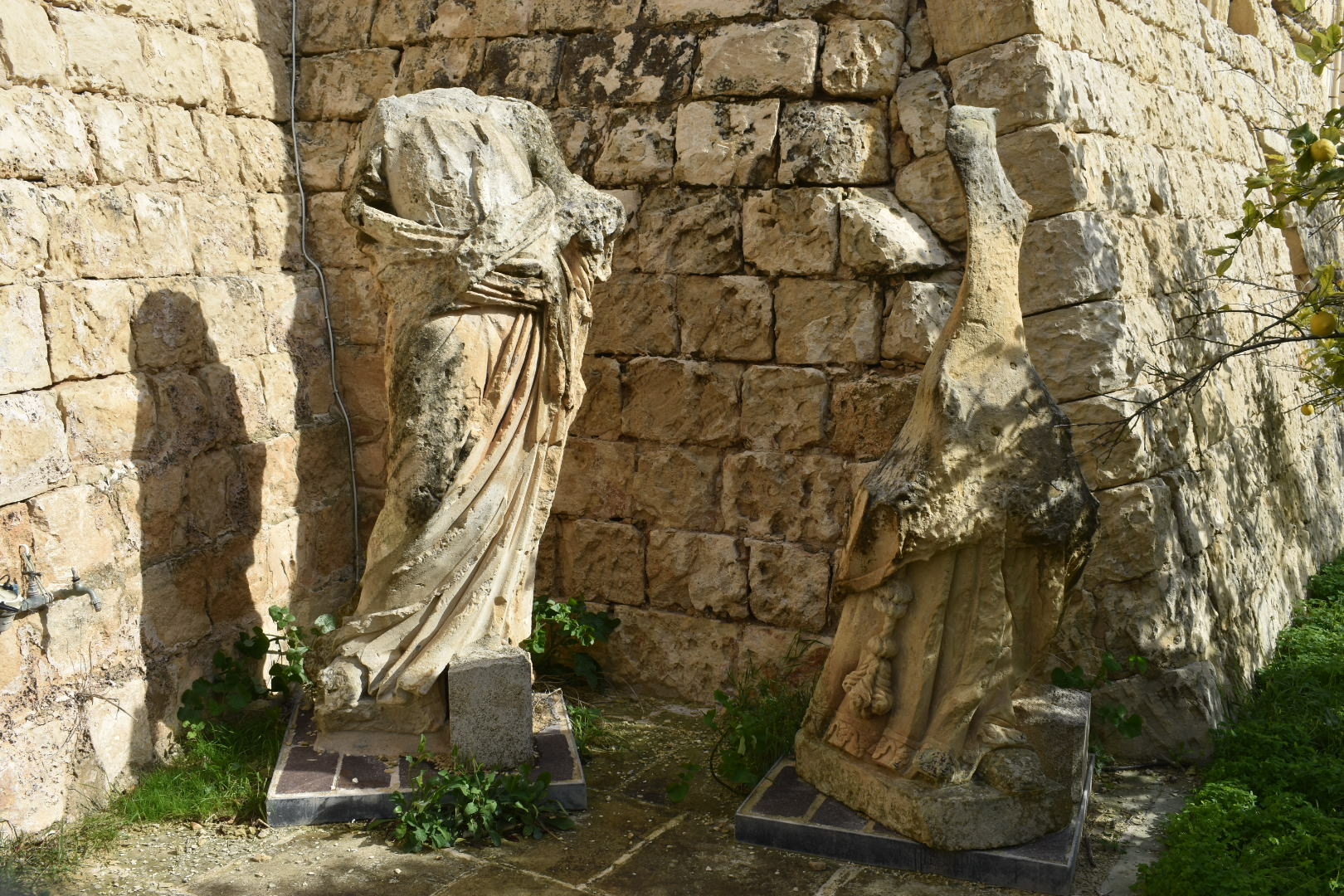
Remains of the statues of St Nicholas and St Paul

The village of Siġġiewi was recognised as a parish at least by 1436, but when exactly is unknown. The old church is believed to have been built soon afterwards in the 15th century. During a 1575 visit, Pietro Dusina mentioned that the church had two lateral altars, two small naves, a sacristy and a baptistery near the main door. A small church dedicated to the Visitation of Our Lady was located adjacent to the old parish church, while other churches dedicated to Saint Sebastian and Saint Michael were also found in the vicinity.

The old parish church seems to have been enlarged in the 16th century, and in 1585 the church of the Visitation was demolished and its masonry was reused within the parish church. A cemetery was located near the church, and it is traditionally held that it was the site of the mass burial of the victims of the 1592–1593 plague epidemic. Bishop Tomás Gargallo visited the church in 1594 and at this point it had five altars. It was enlarged further in the late 16th and early 17th centuries, and by this point the church acquired a cruciform plan. When Bishop Baldassare Cagliares visited the church in 1625, it had seven altars. The church's northern transept was decorated in the Baroque style in the early 17th century.

Structural damage was noticed in the church in the late 17th century, and in 1676 the population of Siġġiewi decided to construct a new parish church in another part of the village. The nave of this church was blessed in 1682 and it was completed in 1693. The old church was abandoned, and in the late 17th century Bishop Davide Cocco Palmieri ordered its demolition. The roof was demolished and a boundary wall was built around it to prevent people from entering the site. Despite this, significant parts of the church including parts of the northern and southern transepts, a wall along the nave and its original flagstone floor still survived, as did a number of decorative architectural elements.

== Ruins ==
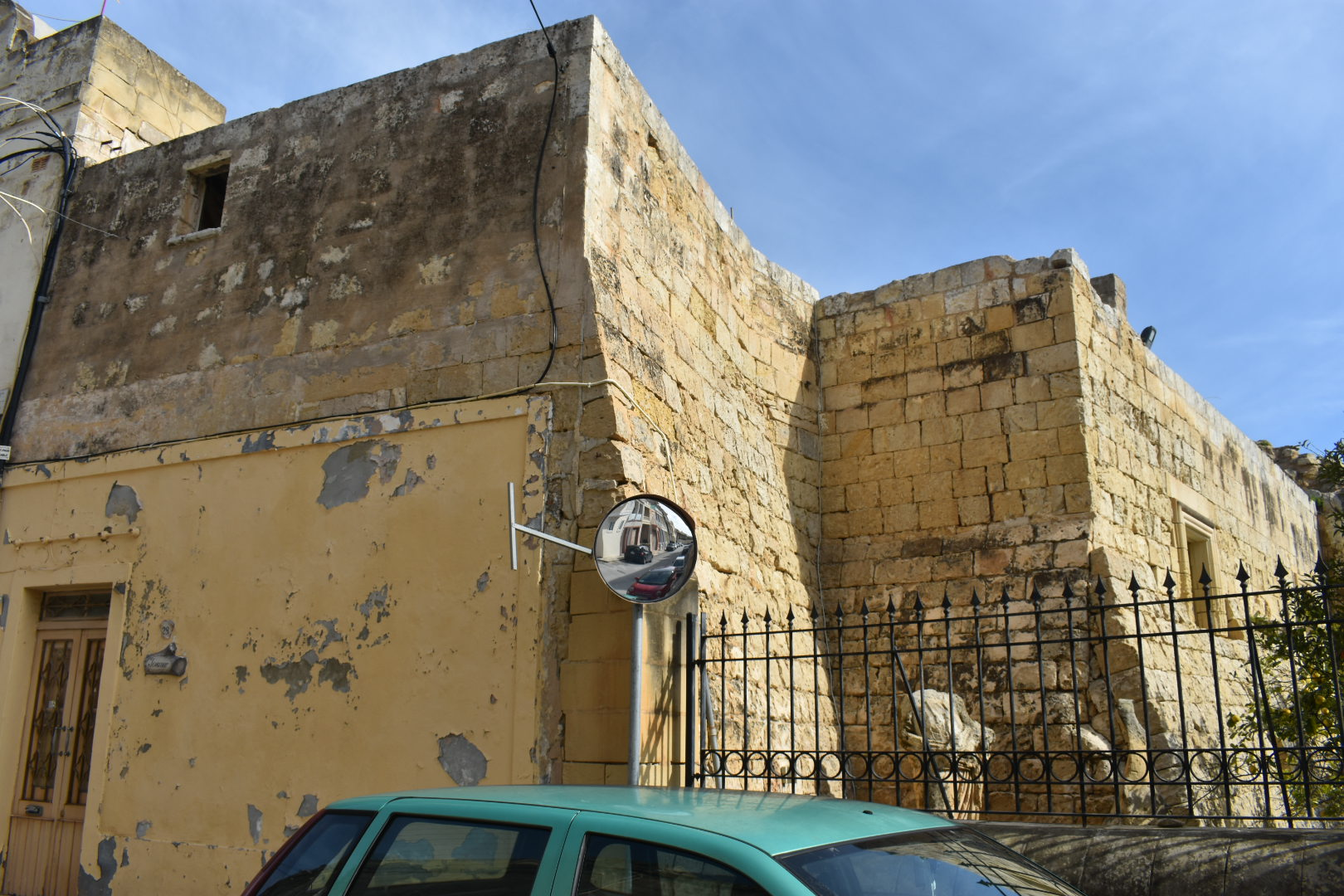
The sacristy in Triq il-Knisja l-Qadima

The site of the old parish church remained the property of the ecclesiastical authorities. The ruins were eventually neglected and used for agricultural purposes, with parts of the structure being buried under soil. An orchard with fruit trees and prickly pears was established on the site. Part of the sacristy was converted into a dwelling, and it did not fall into ruin like the rest of the church. A stone cross known as is-Salib tad-Dejma was built nearby, probably to mark the location of the former church, and a niche with a relief of Saint Mary and souls was installed above a doorway leading to the ruins.

In the 19th century, the artist Giuseppe Hyzler made some sketches of frescoes found in the ruined church, and a number of early 20th century photographs of the ruins also exist. The street in which the church was located became known as Triq il-Knisja l-Qadima (Maltese for Old Church Street). The church ruins were scheduled with Grade 1 protection in 1998, and the sacristy was given the same protection in 2010.

In 2006 and 2007, the ruins of the church were restored by the Restoration Unit of the Ministry for Resources and Infrastructure. The works were carried out by the architect Norbert Gatt, and lasted for ten months. Archaeological excavations were also carried out at this point. The project was awarded a Silver Medal Trophy and Prix d'Honneur for restoration and conservation by Din l-Art Ħelwa in 2008. In 2018 plans were made to allow construction of three-story buildings adjacent to the ruined church. These were met with objections by the Siġġiewi local council and NGOs.
