= Archbishop's Palace, Mdina =

Archbishop's Palace
- Il-Palazz tal-Arċisqof
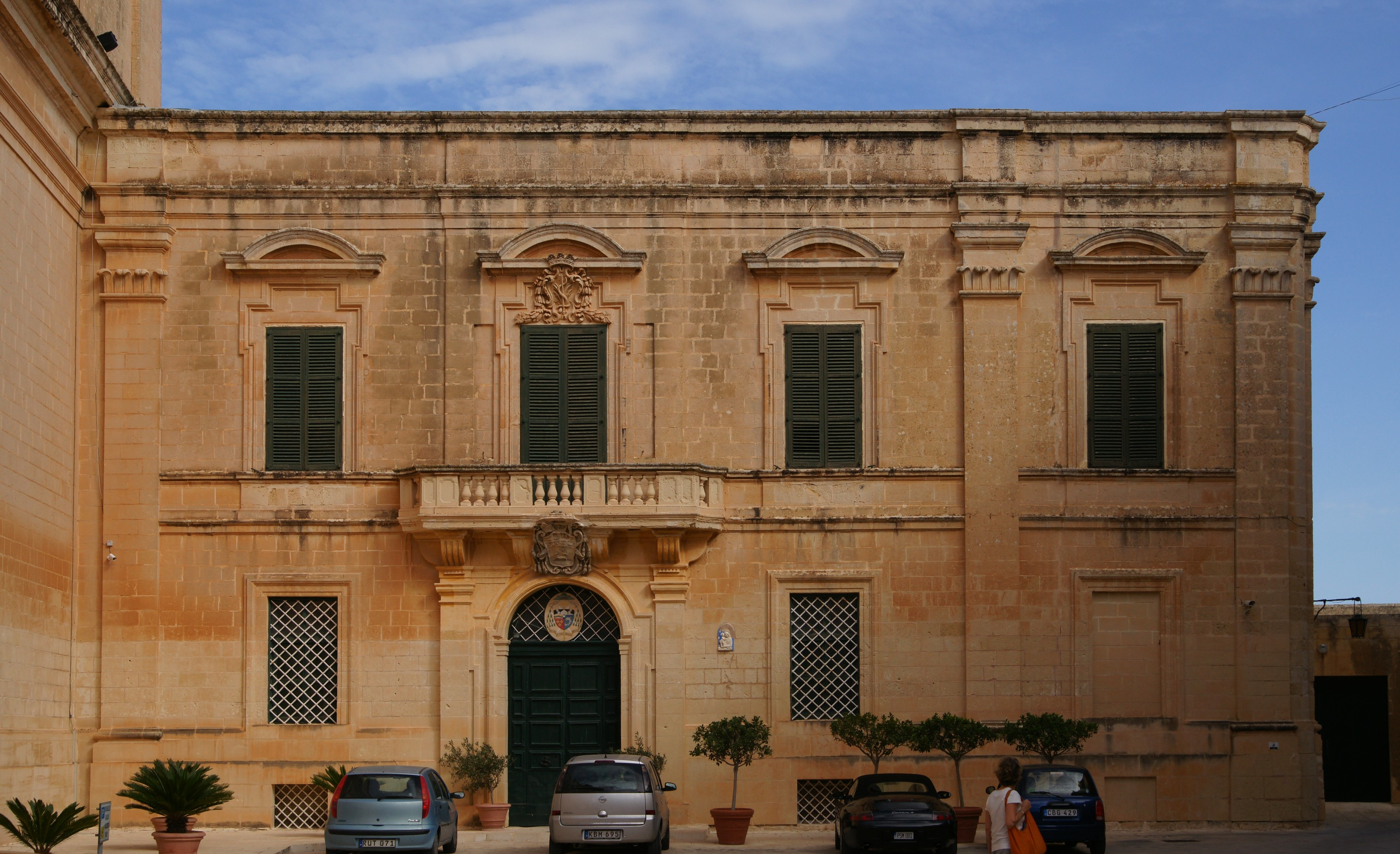
- Façade of the Archbishop's Palace in 2013
- Interactive map of the Archbishop's Palace area
- Former names: Bishop's Palace

General information
- Status: Intact
- Type: Palace
- Location: Mdina, Malta
- Coordinates: 35°53′10.2″N 14°24′15.4″E
- Construction started: 1718
- Completed: 1720
- Owner: Archdiocese of Malta

Technical details
- Material: Limestone

Design and construction
- Architect: Lorenzo Gafà

The Archbishop's Palace (Maltese: Il-Palazz tal-Arċisqof), known prior to 1944 as the Bishop's Palace (Maltese: Il-Palazz tal-Isqof), (Note: Malta was a Diocese headed by a Bishop prior to being elevated to an Archdiocese headed by an Archbishop by Pope Pius XII on 1 January 1944.) is a palatial building in Mdina, Malta which is a residence of the Archbishop of Malta. It was constructed in the early 18th century, and it is located close to St Paul's Cathedral and the Mdina Cathedral Museum.

== History ==
A bishop's residence existed in Mdina in 1445, and amongst other functions it housed the diocese's archives (Archivum Archiepiscopalis Melitensis, AAM). The residence and administrative seat moved from Mdina to a second Bishop's Palace in the capital city of Valletta in the mid-1630s.

The present building was constructed between 1718 and 1720 according to the designs of architect Lorenzo Gafà, shortly after the reconstruction of the adjacent St Paul's Cathedral.

On 10 June 1798, during the French invasion of Malta, the palace hosted a council meeting during which city officials decided to surrender Mdina to the French without a fight. The capitulation document was signed within the palace, and on the same day French general Claude-Henri Belgrand de Vaubois and his staff were invited to dine with Bishop Vincenzo Labini.

== Architecture ==
The palace is built within a restricted site in Archbishop's Square directly adjacent to the Cathedral and the city's fortifications. Its exterior gives an impression of importance and elegance despite being dominated by the cathedral, and the ground floor consists of small, undecorated rooms while the upper floor is more imposing.

== See also ==
- Bishop's Palace, Birgu
- Archbishop's Palace, Valletta
