= Jean de Bosredon de Ransijat =

French nobleman and knight (1743–1812)

Fra Jean de Boisredon de Ransijat
- Born: 1743
- Died: 1812 (aged 68–69)
- Occupations: Hospitaller knight; government official
- Organization: Order of Saint John
- Known for: Role in the 1798 French occupation of Malta; President of the Commission of Government
- Relatives: Sylvain de Bosredon (nephew)

Fra Jean de Boisredon de Ransijat (1743–1812) was a French nobleman and Hospitaller knight who played a role in the fall of Hospitaller Malta to Revolutionary France in 1798. He was also the President of the Commission of Government during the subsequent French occupation of Malta.

Jean de Boisredon de Ransijat was born to a French noble family with deep ties to the Order of Saint John. He was related to a number of other knights within the Order's Langue of Auvergne, including his nephew Sylvain de Bosredon.

Bosredon de Ransijat attained the rank of Commander and Grand Cross within the Hospitaller Order, and he was also the Secretary of the Treasury. He was a supporter of the French Revolution, and his residence in Lija and his apartments at the Treasury served as meeting places for Jacobins.

When the French invasion of Malta occurred in June 1798, Bosredon de Ransijat addressed a letter to Grand Master Ferdinand von Hompesch zu Bolheim in which he expressed his reluctance to fight the French and asked to remain neutral in the conflict. He was briefly imprisoned in Fort St. Angelo as a result of this, but he was subsequently freed and he took part in the negotiations in which the Hospitallers agreed to capitulate to the French.

Bosredon de Ransijat was subsequently appointed as the President of the newly established Commission of Government. In order to procure finances for the new administration, he sent missions to gather valuables from monasteries and churches, violating the terms of surrender. This was one of the main causes of the subsequent Maltese rebellion against French rule which began in September 1798.
