= Archbishop's Palace, Valletta =

Archbishop's Palace
- Il-Palazz tal-Arċisqof
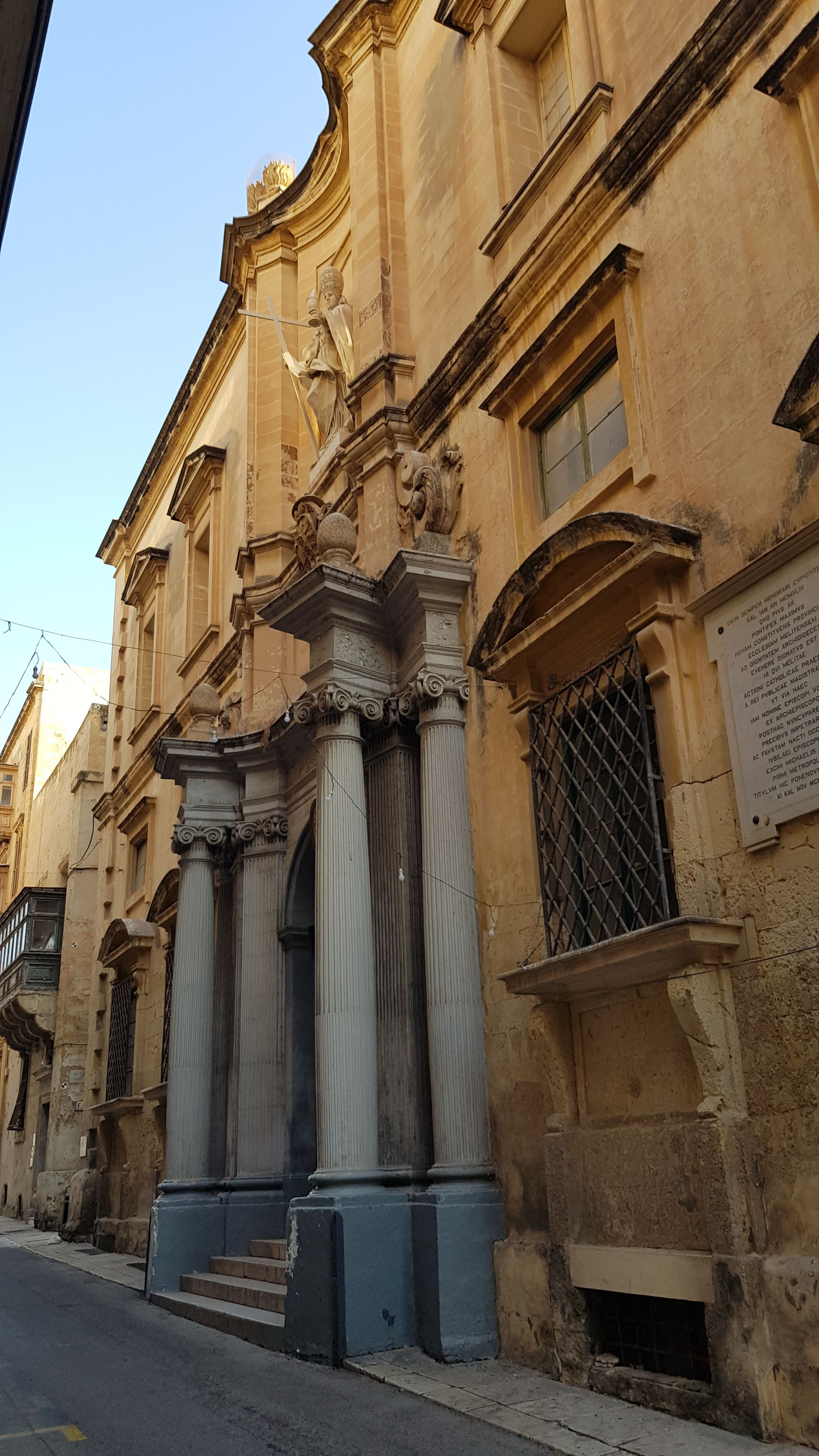
- Façade of the Archbishop's Palace in 2019
- Interactive map of the Archbishop's Palace area
- Former names: Bishop's Palace

General information
- Status: Intact
- Type: Palace
- Location: Valletta, Malta
- Coordinates: 35°54′02.2″N 14°30′46.5″E
- Construction started: 1622
- Completed: 1631
- Renovated: 1730; 20th century
- Cost: 12,000 scudi
- Client: Baldassare Cagliares
- Owner: Archdiocese of Malta

Technical details
- Material: Limestone

Design and construction
- Architect: Tommaso Dingli

Renovating team
- Architect: Vincenzo Bonello

The Archbishop's Palace or Archiepiscopal Palace (Maltese: Il-Palazz tal-Arċisqof), known prior to 1944 as the Bishop's Palace (Maltese: Il-Palazz tal-Isqof, Italian: Palazzo Vescovile), (Note: Malta was a Diocese headed by a Bishop prior to being elevated to an Archdiocese headed by an Archbishop by Pope Pius XII on 1 January 1944.) is a palatial building in Valletta, Malta which is a residence of the Archbishop of Malta. It was constructed in the 17th century.

== History ==
The palace was purpose-built as a residence for Baldassare Cagliares, the first Maltese-born Bishop of Malta, between 1622 and 1631. (Note: One source states that the building dates back to the 1640s.) It was designed by the architect Tommaso Dingli. The building's construction was controversial, as the Order of St. John which at the time ruled Malta regarded Cagliares' plans to move the Bishop's seat to Valletta as impinging upon their jurisdiction over the city.

Nevertheless, the building was mostly completed and the Diocese of Malta's administrative seat and Bishop's residence moved to Valletta by the mid-1630s. The cost of construction up to 1631 amounted to 12,000 scudi. Apart from administrative and residential functions, the palace was also a venue for greeting dignitaries and it housed the archdiocese's archives (Archivum Archiepiscopalis Melitensis, AAM).

In 1730, the building was altered with the addition of a loggia and other amenities at the expense of Bishop Paul Alphéran de Bussan. Due to a dispute between the Diocese and the Order, the palace's first storey was left unfinished until the 20th century, when it was completed during the episcopate of Archbishop Mikiel Gonzi. The latter works were undertaken by architect Vincenzo Bonello.

In the late 1970s, the Curia moved from the palace to premises in Floriana, and the AAM were likewise moved accordingly. Gonzi was the last Archbishop who actually lived in the palace, but today the building is still in use by the Archdiocese, housing its Judicial Tribunal.

The building and its collections underwent restoration work which was funded by the Archdiocese in 2019, and it is sometimes open to the public on special occasions.

== Description ==
The palace includes an oratory dedicated to Saint Joseph. It also has underground water cisterns, a natural spring and a garden, with the latter being the largest residential garden in Valletta, containing citrus trees and a 17th-century fountain.

The palace contains a collection of paintings and sculptures, including a portrait of Alphéran de Bussan by Francesco Zahra.

== See also ==
- Bishop's Palace, Birgu
- Archbishop's Palace, Mdina
