= Martín Royas de Portalrubio =

Spanish Roman Catholic prelate

His Excellency Martín Royas de Portalrubio O.S.Io.Hieros.
- Bishop of Malta
- Church: Roman Catholic
- Diocese: Malta
- Appointed: 5 November 1572
- In office: 1572-1577
- Predecessor: Domenico Cubelles
- Successor: Tomás Gargallo
- Other post: Inquisitor of Malta

Orders
- Consecration: 9 November 1572
- Rank: Bishop

Personal details
- Born: 1512 Toledo, Spain
- Died: 19 March 1577 (aged 64–65) Rome, Papal States

Martín Royas de Portalrubio also simply known as Martín Royas (1512 - 19 March 1577) was a Spanish Roman Catholic prelate who became the Bishop of Malta in 1572.

== Biography ==
Royas was born in Toledo, Spain in 1512. Upon the death of Domenico Cubelles in 1566, Philip II of Spain wanted to appoint Royas as Bishop of Malta, however Pope Pius V refused to accept the appointment. Consequently, the see was not filled until the death of Pius V when Royas was appointed as Bishop of Malta by Pope Gregory XIII on 5 November 1572. He was ordained in Rome a few days later on 9 November. Royas was also the second Inquisitor of Malta. During his episcopacy, Royas was renowned for accusing Grand Master Jean de la Cassière of the Order of St John on numerous occasions to the Holy See. He also accused a number of members of the order of becoming Lutherans. Such clashes were due to his post as Inquisitor of Malta. The order was not content with having one person holding the offices of bishop and inquisitor of Malta simultaneously, and la Cassière convinced the Pope to appoint a separate inquisitor for Malta. In 1574, Pietro Dusina was appointed inquisitor instead of Royas. In 1576, Royas left for Rome where he died on 19 March 1577.
