= Amedeo Preziosi =

Maltese artist (1816–1882)

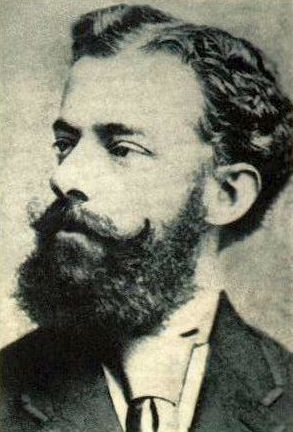
- Born: Aloysius-Rosarius-Amadeus-Raymundus-Andreas; 2 December 1816; Crown Colony of Malta
- Died: 27 September 1882 (aged 65); Santo Stefano, Ottoman Empire
- Education: Giuseppe Hyzler; Beaux-Arts de Paris
- Known for: Painting
- Notable work: Costumes of Constantinople album, Stamboul, Recollections of Eastern Life album, Souvenir du Caïre album, La Valachie par Preziosi sketchbook
- Movement: Neoclassicism, Orientalism, Romanticism

Amedeo Preziosi (2 December 1816 – 27 September 1882) was a Maltese painter and traveler known for his watercolours and prints of Constantinople, the Balkans, Ottoman Empire, and Romania.

== Biography ==
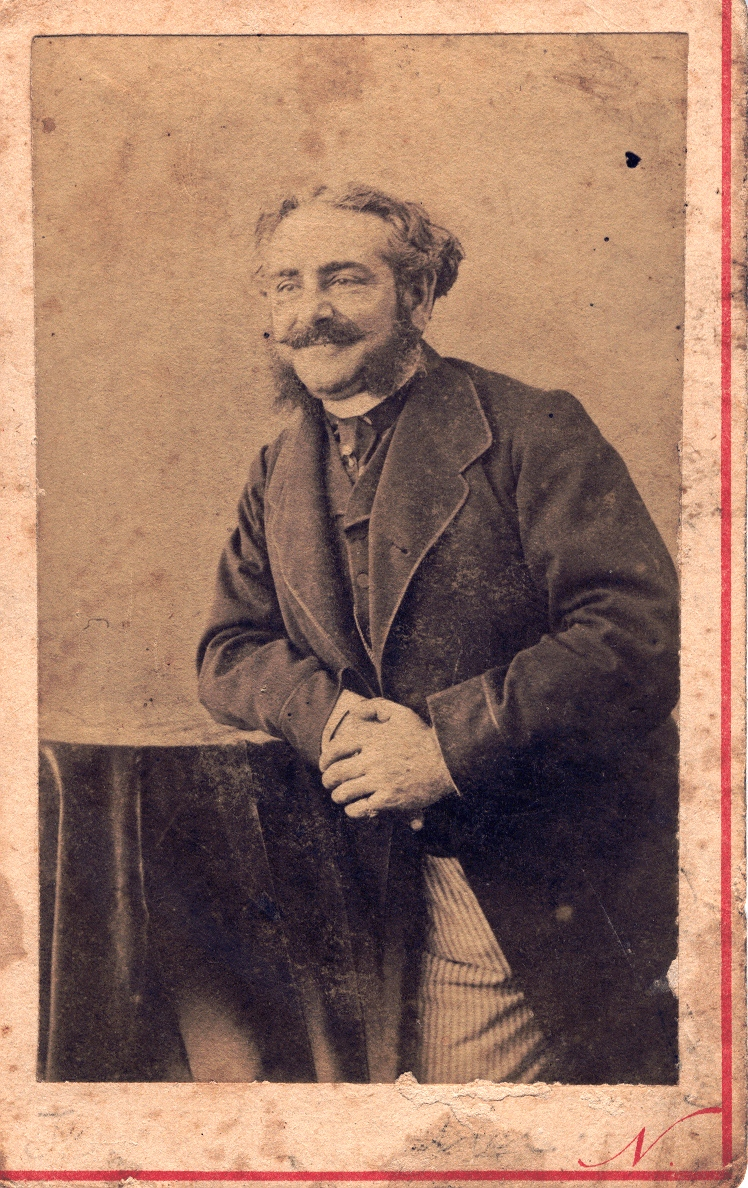
Amedeo Preziosi, photographic portrait by Nadar (between 1860 and 1870)

Amedeo Preziosi was born in 1816 in Malta to a noble family of Italian descent. His father, Giovanni Francesco Preziosi, had high-level functions in the local administration and represented the Maltese people at the negotiations of the Treaty of Amiens in 1802, while his mother, Margareta née Reynaud, was of French origin. Amedeo, the first child of the Preziosi family, was baptised in the Porto Salvo Church in Valletta and given the name Aloysius-Rosarius-Amadeus-Raymundus-Andreas. His younger brother Leandro Preziosi became one of the pioneers of early photography in Malta.

Amedeo was attracted by the arts from early age and was taught by Giuseppe Hyzler, a very appreciated painter in Malta. While his father wanted Amedeo to study law, sending him to study at the Law School in Sorbonne, Amedeo was more interested in arts and continues his painting studies at the École des Beaux-Arts. After his return home, Amedeo did not find in Malta a suitable environment for an artist, especially since his father disapproved his chosen career. As such, Amedeo chose to leave the island and move to the Near East, an area lauded by the fellow artists in Paris. The year when he left Malta for Istanbul is not known, but is thought to be between 1840 and 1842.

The earliest drawings of Istanbul are dated November 1842. Two years later, in 1844, Preziosi was commissioned by Robert Curzon, the private secretary of the British Ambassador to Istanbul, Lord Stratford Canning, 1st Viscount Stratford de Redcliffe to create an album called Costumes of Constantinople, which now is located in the collections of the British Museum.

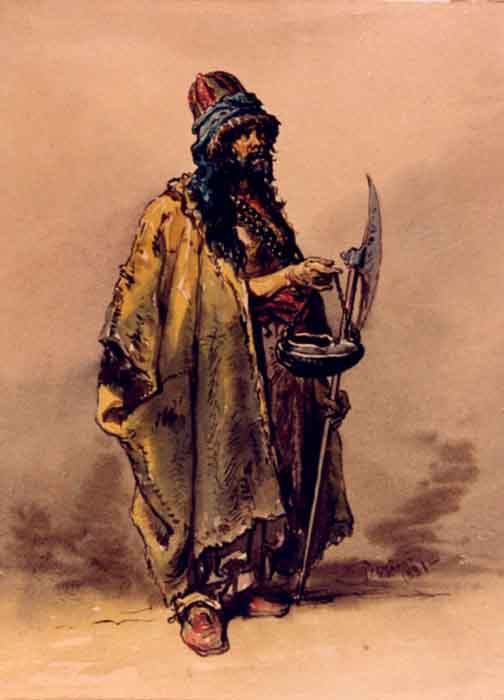
Ottoman Dervish portrayed by Amedeo Preziosi, 1860s circa, Muzeul Naţional de Artă al României

In an era when postal cards were still at their beginning and so was the photographic art, Preziosi offered the European tourists and visitors of Istanbul drawings of the city and the surroundings. In 1858, he decided to publish the most popular works as lithographs at the Lemercier workshop in Paris. The chromolithography album, named Stamboul, Recollections of Eastern Life and re-edited in 1861 as Stamboul, Souvenir d'Orient was drawn on the lithography stone by Preziosi himself. He published a second album, Souvenir du Caïre, comprising drawings he made during a trip to Egypt.

Preziosi married a Greek woman of Constantinople, with whom he had four children: Mathilde, Giulia, Catherine and Roberto, living in Hamalbaşi Sokağı in Pera and later in the quiet village of San Stefano (today Yeşilköy), away from the agitation of the city.

Preziosi knew Italian - his mother tongue - and for sure French. Moreover, he had possibly some knowledge of English and Greek, and may also have acquired some Turkish. This was enough to work as deputy of the dragoman of the British Embassy as well as the First Dragoman of the Greek legation.

His workshop was routinely visited by tourists wishing to return home with a souvenir of Istanbul, and among his guests was, in April 1869, Edward VII of the United Kingdom, then the Prince of Wales, who bought several watercolours from him. In 1866, as the new Prince of Romania, Carol I visited Istanbul, he met Preziosi and invited him to Romania to make watercolours of the landscapes and people of the country.

Preziosi came to Romania in June 1868 and began drawing scenes from Bucharest as well as several others across the country, including a few which depict Prince Carol I. The sketches he draw were later turned into watercolours in his workshop in Istanbul, which he would then sell to the Prince of Romania for prices ranging from 300 to 1200 Francs. The following year, between May 30 and July 15, Preziosi spent time again in Romania, his drawings, in pencil, ink and watercolours are found in a sketchbook La Valachie par Preziosi, now found at the Municipal Museum in Bucharest.

After his return from his last trip to Romania, little is known of Preziosi. He continued his art in Istanbul, but as photography became widespread, his watercolours were no longer as profitable, since cheap and unlimited numbers of copies could be made of a particular photograph.

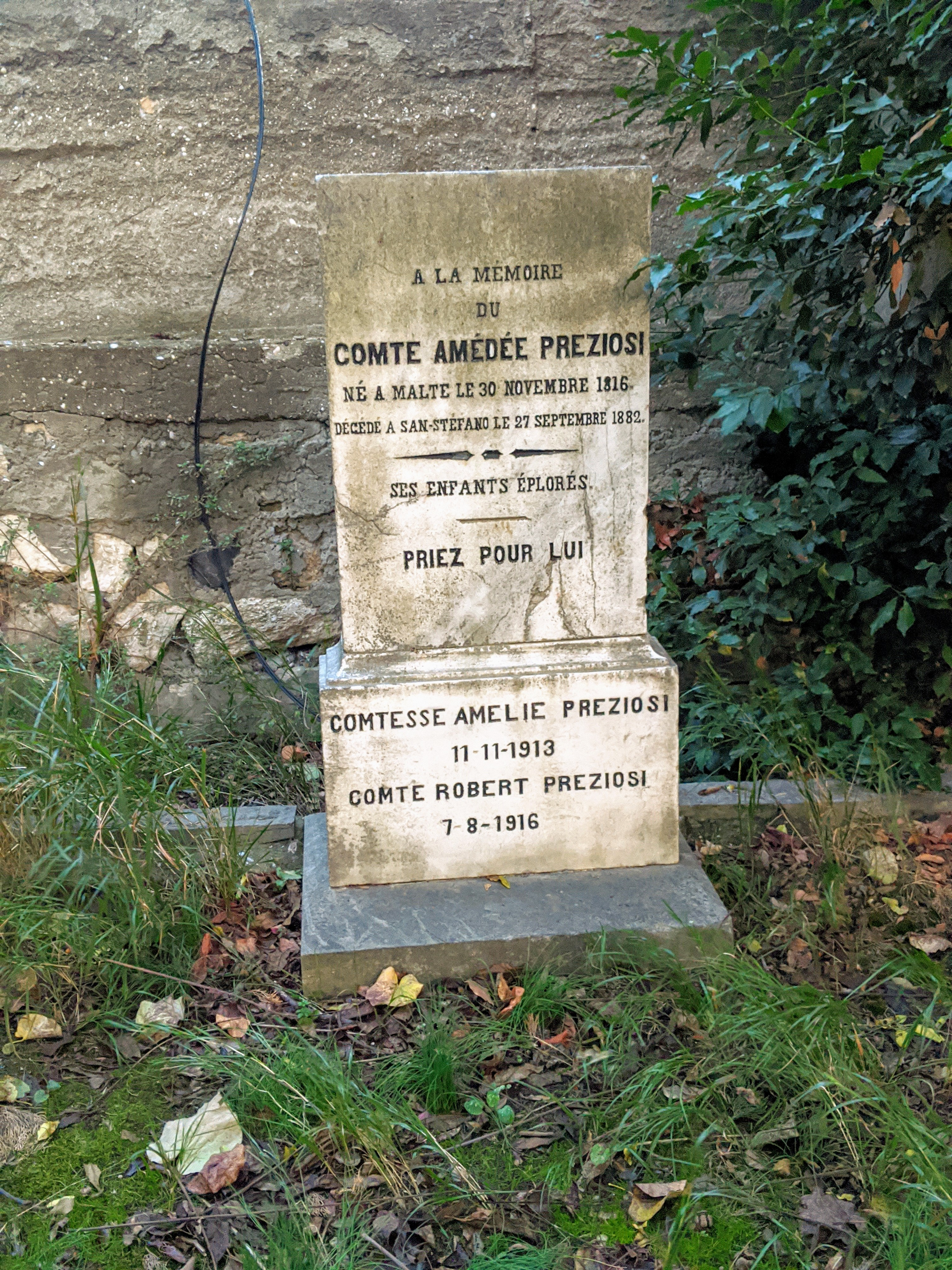
Preziosi's grave in the old Roman Catholic cemetery in Yeşilköy (formerly San Stefano), Istanbul, Turkey.

Preziosi was killed by an accidental gun discharge while hunting. He was buried in the Catholic cemetery of Santo Stefano (today Yeşilköy), Istanbul.

== Legacy ==
After his death, his works were forgotten for decades. In Bucharest, his works were presented again to the public in 1934, and in 1985, some of his works were displayed in an exhibition at London's Victoria and Albert Museum dedicated to him and in 2003, an exhibition of his works in Bucharest was organized by the Museum of Bucharest.

== Works ==
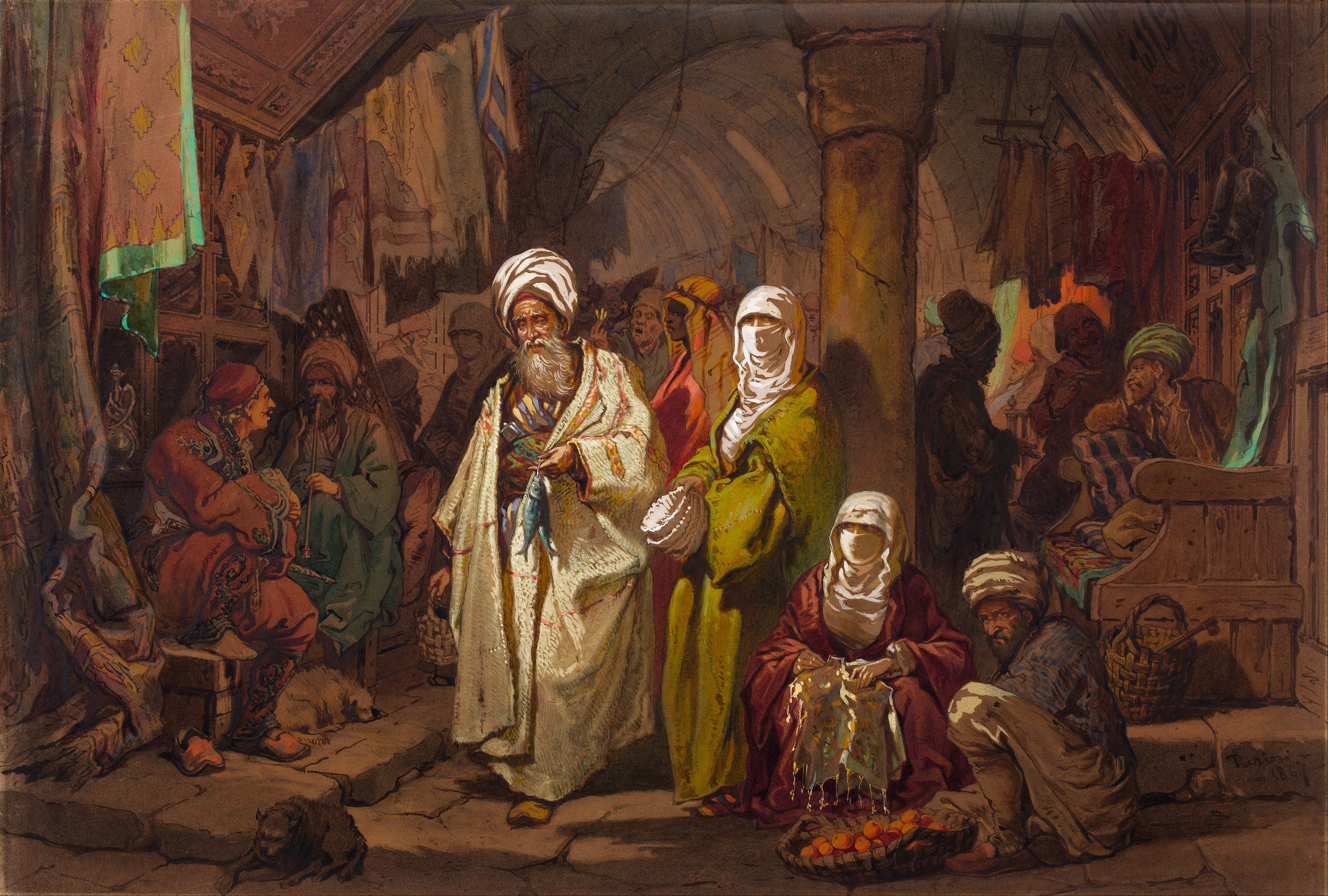
The Grand Bazaar

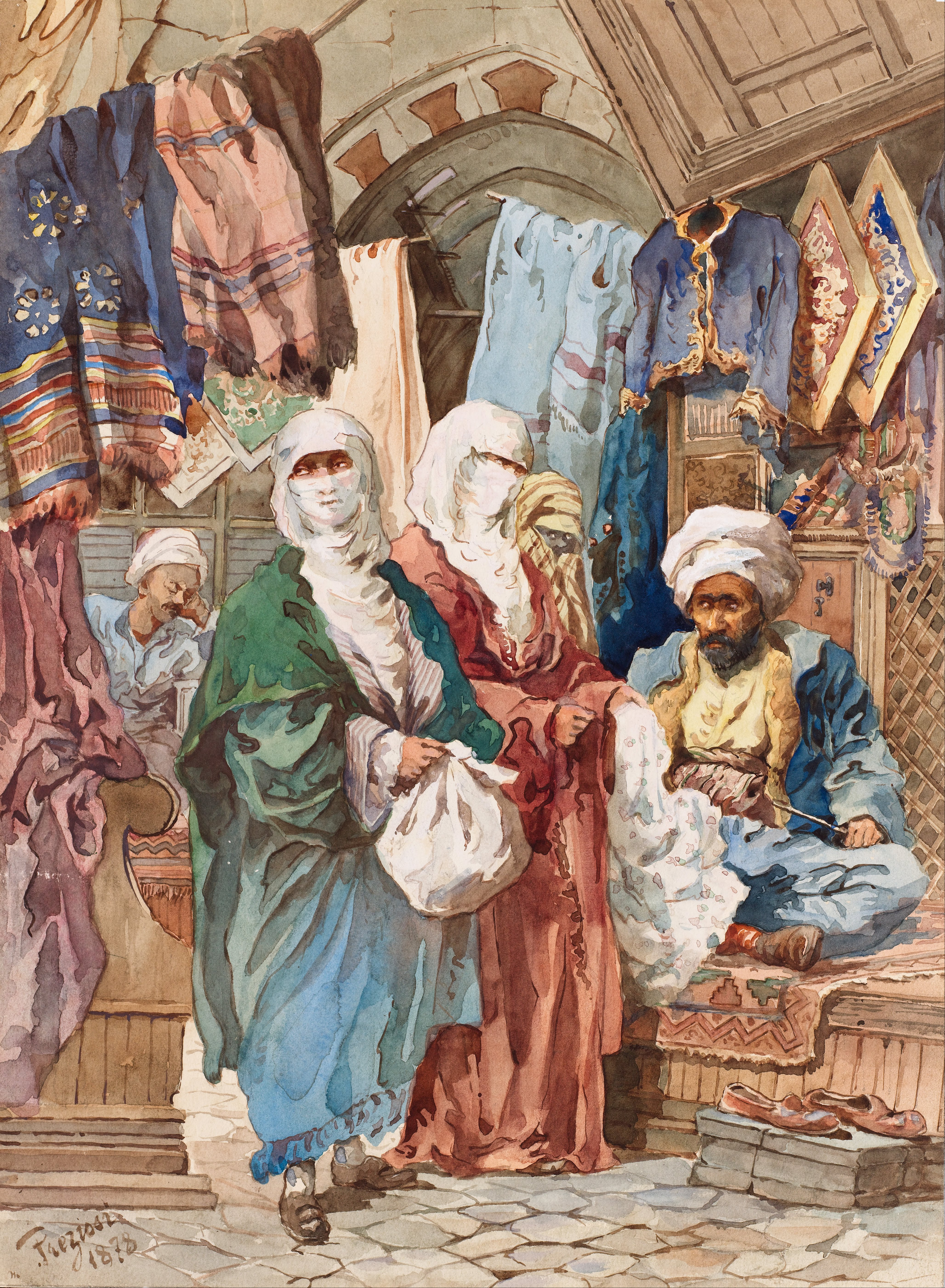
The Silk Bazaar

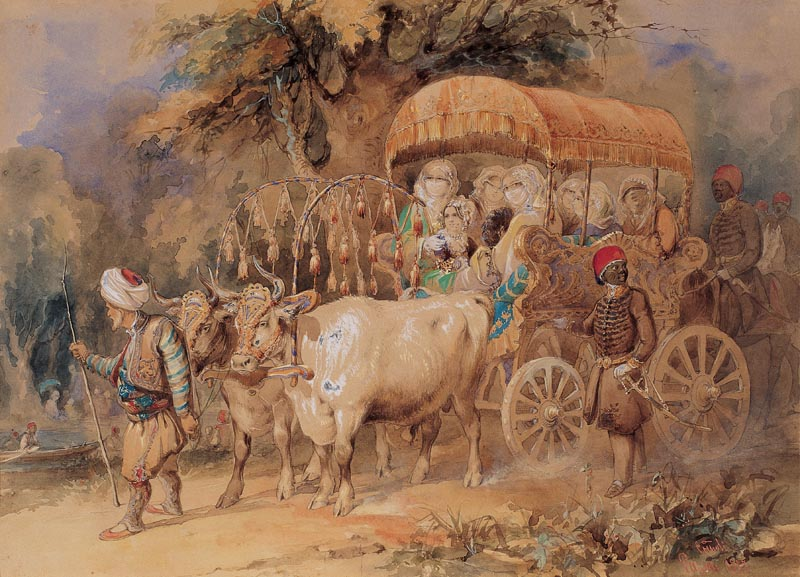
Arabian ox cart

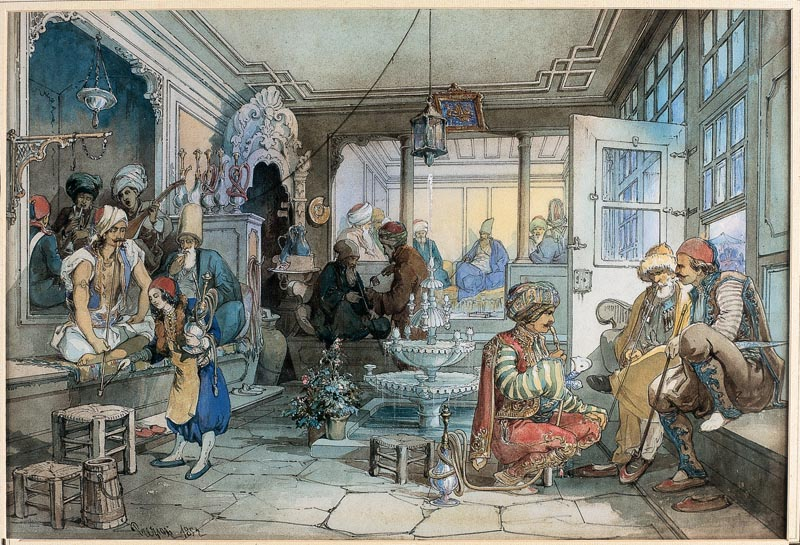
A café in Istanbul

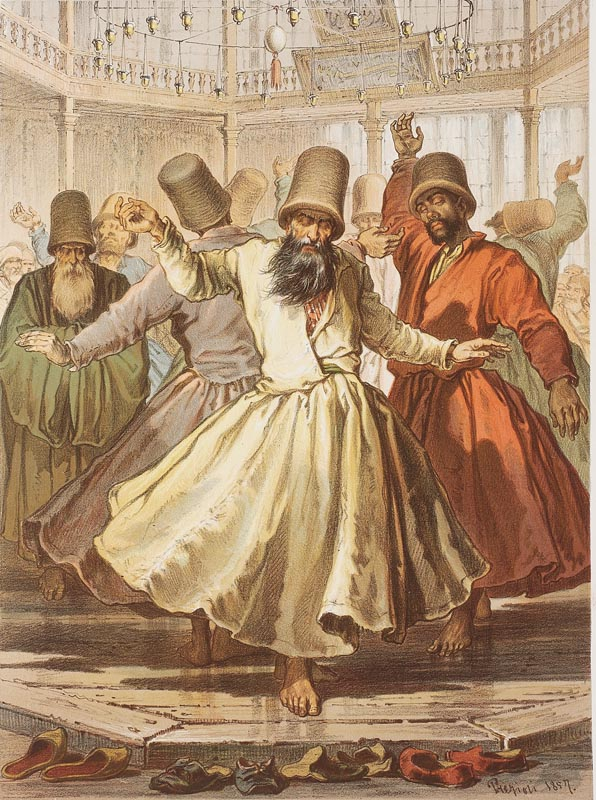
Sufi whirling

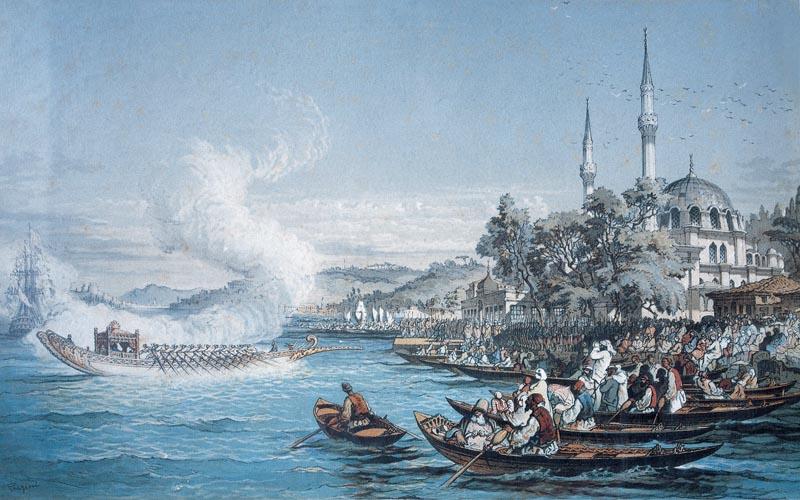
Istanbul boats

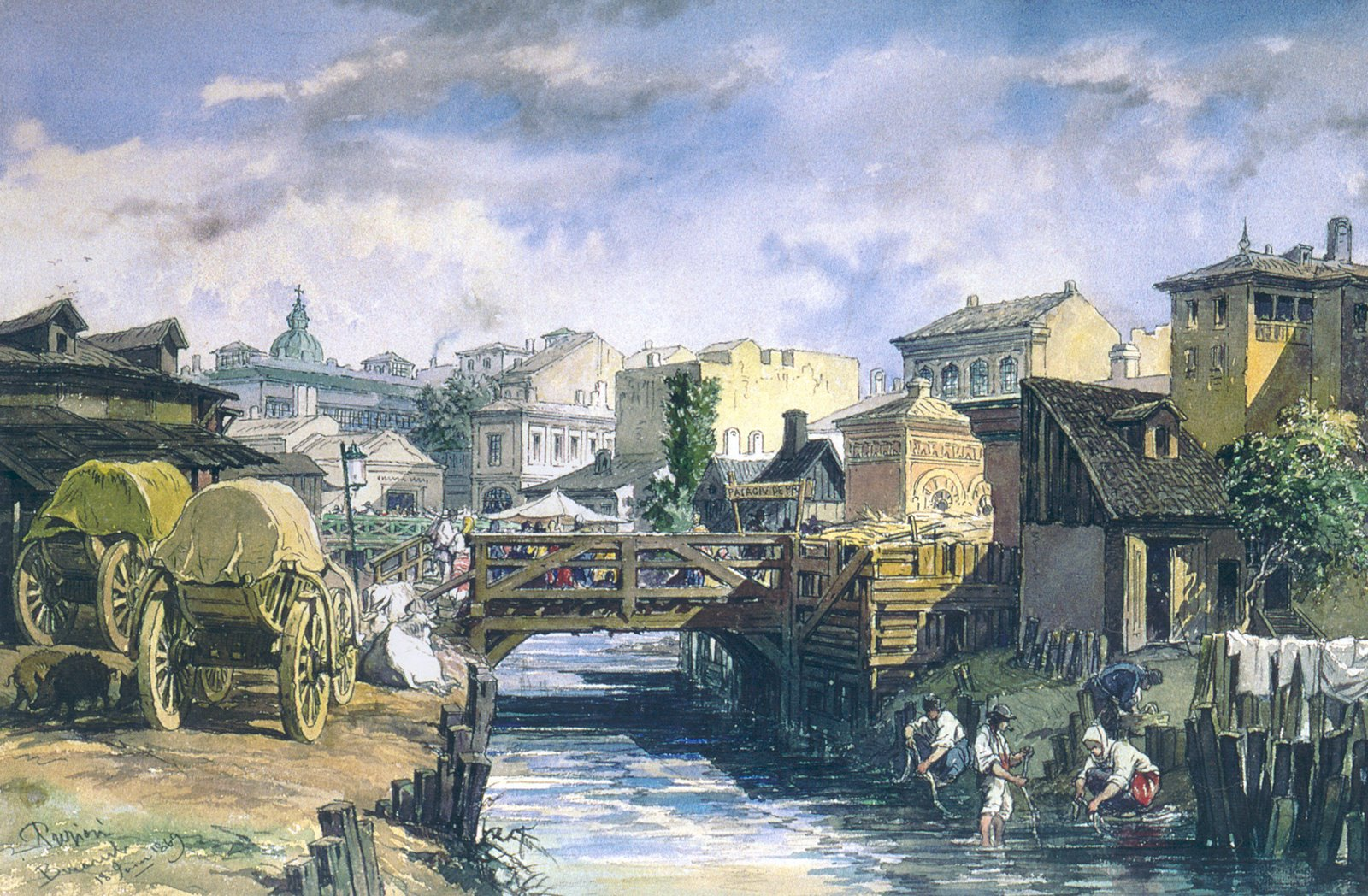
Dâmbovița River in Bucharest

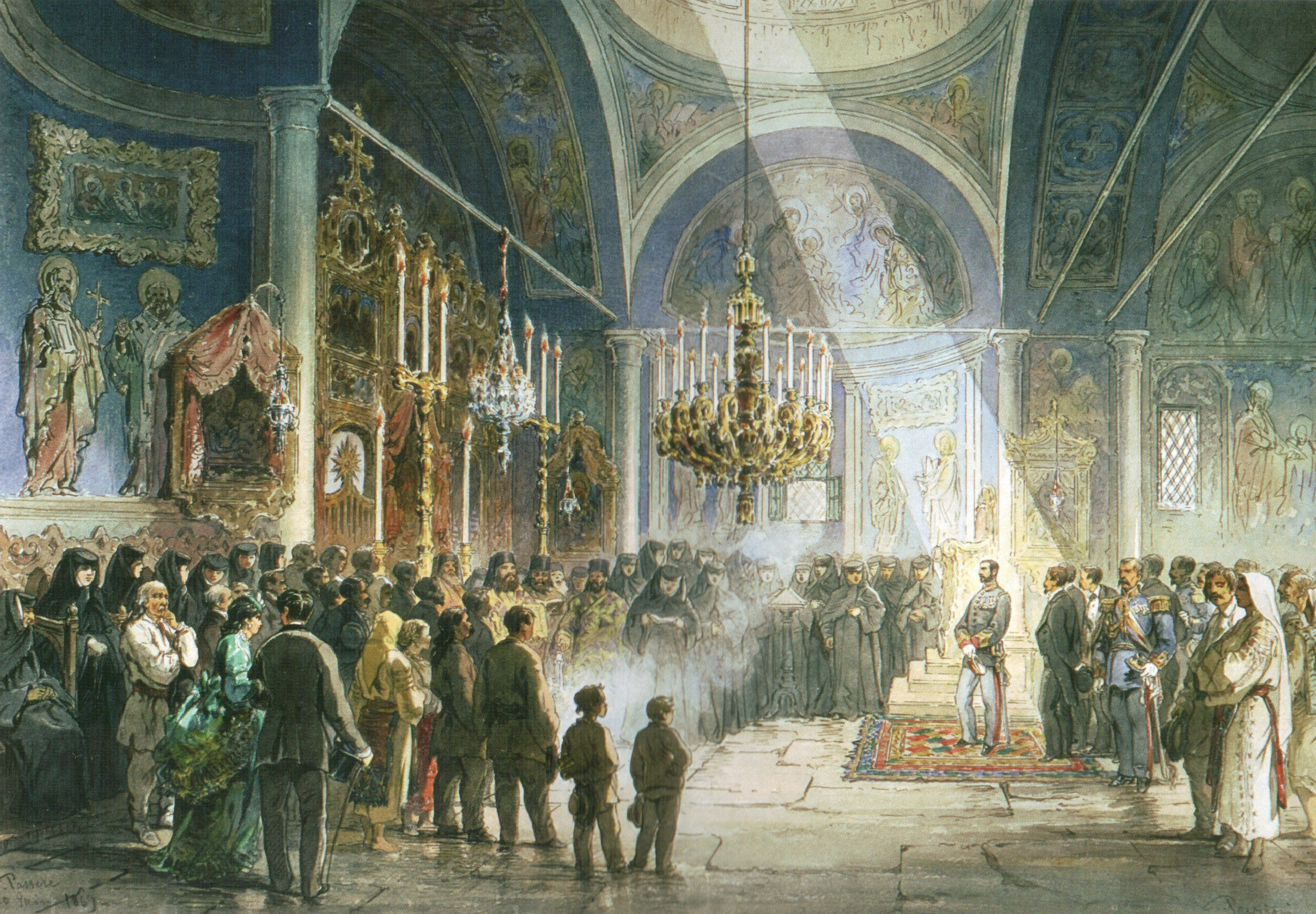
Visit of Carol I at Pasărea Monastery, Wallachia

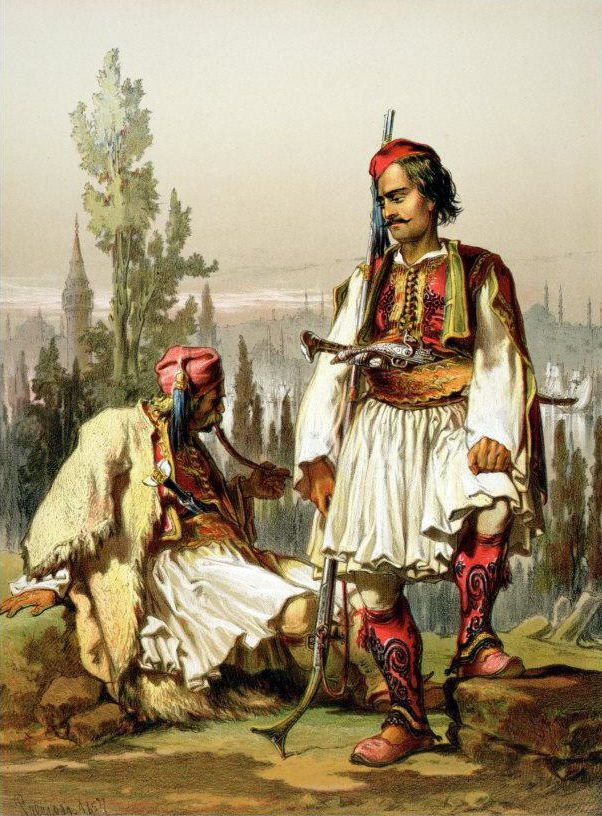
Albanian Mercenaries

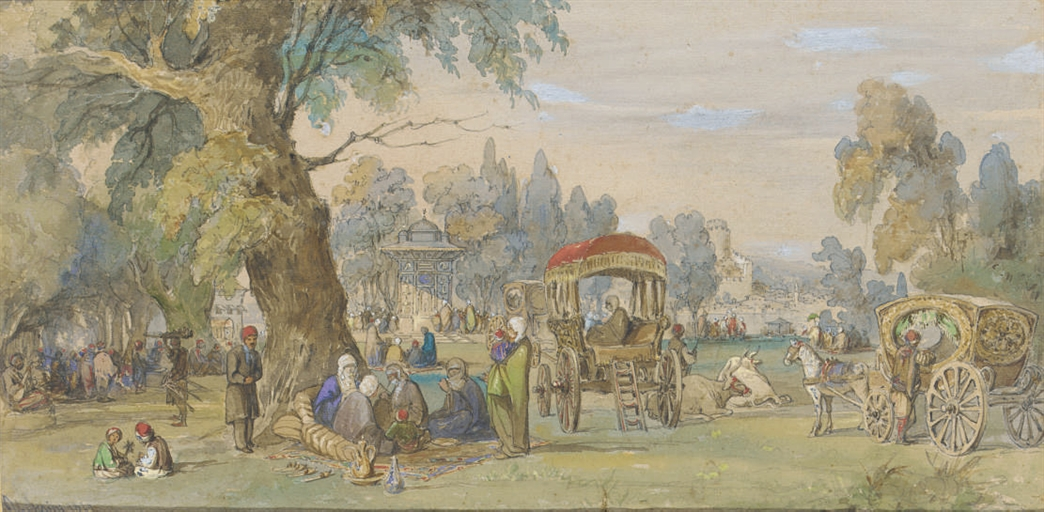
In a Turkish Park

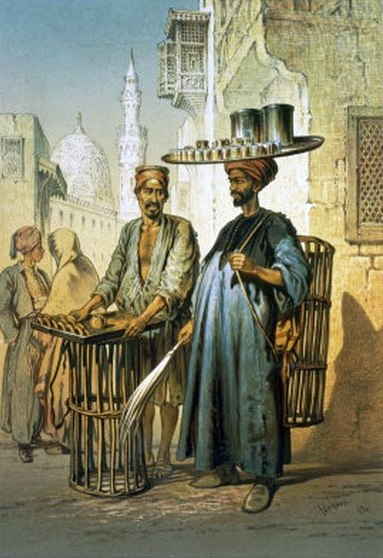
The Tea Seller from Souvenir of Cairo 1862

== See also ==
- List of Orientalist artists
- Orientalism
