= Giuseppe Hyzler =

Maltese painter (1787–1858)

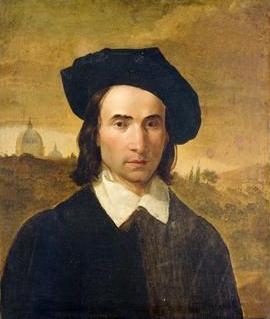
Self-portrait of Giuseppe Hyzler in Nazarene attire

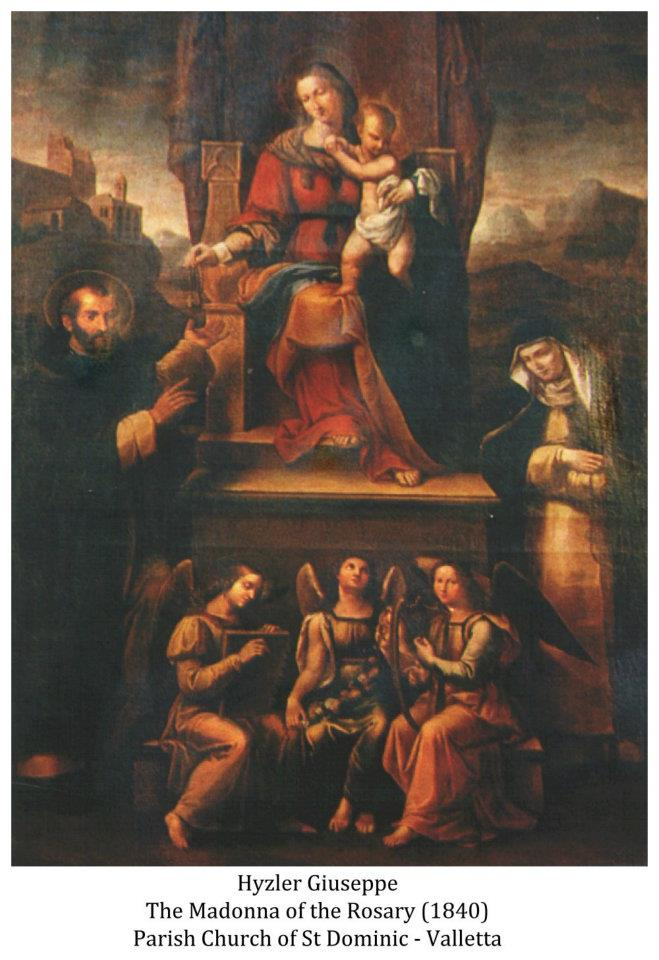
Madonna of the Rosary (St. Dominic Church, Valletta)

Giuseppe Hyzler (Maltese: Ġużeppi Hyzler, 1787 – 19 January 1858) was a Maltese painter of German descent who was part of the Nazarene movement.

== Biography ==
Born in Malta from a German background, he was awarded a scholarship by the Governor of Malta, Sir Thomas Maitland, in 1814, to pursue his artistic education in Rome. There Hyzler joined the Nazarene movement, led by Friedrich Overbeck, to whom his brother Vincenzo Hyzler (1813–1849) had grown close. The Nazarenes lived in a community near Rome, wearing black dresses and long hair. They deemed sacred art as the highest cultural expression; in particular 14th-15th century frescoes. After the community dissolved, Giuseppe Hyzler returned to Malta in 1823, where he opened a private art school. He taught Amedeo Preziosi amongst others.

Hyzler was responsible for removing some Baroque art from St John's Co-Cathedral, including the ornate altar in the chapel of the langue of France.

By the mid-19th century, he was considered one of Malta's most accomplished painters. He was a representative of Neoclassicist and Academic style, until the artistic scene was revolutionized by Romanticism, as practised by Giuseppe Calì. In 1953, Edward Sammut remarked that "Their paintings are noted for the cold academism of the drawing and the rather forced classical poses of their figures."

He died on 19 January 1858.

== Legacy ==
There is a street in Mosta named after him.

== Works ==
- Madonna of the Rosary, 1840, Parish Church of St. Dominic, Valletta
- Our lady of Mount Carmel, Our Saviour's Church, Lija
- Buttresses on the nave walls, St Catherine's Old Church, Żejtun
- Sketches of frescoes found in the ruined Old Church of Siġġiewi
- Relazione dello stato delle scuole del Disegno nell’Universita’ di Malta dal 1802 al 1850, anonymous work attributed to Hyzler by Dominic Cutajar.
