= Domenico Cubelles =

Spanish Roman Catholic bishop

His Excellency Domenico Cubelles O.S.Io.Hieros.
- Bishop of Malta
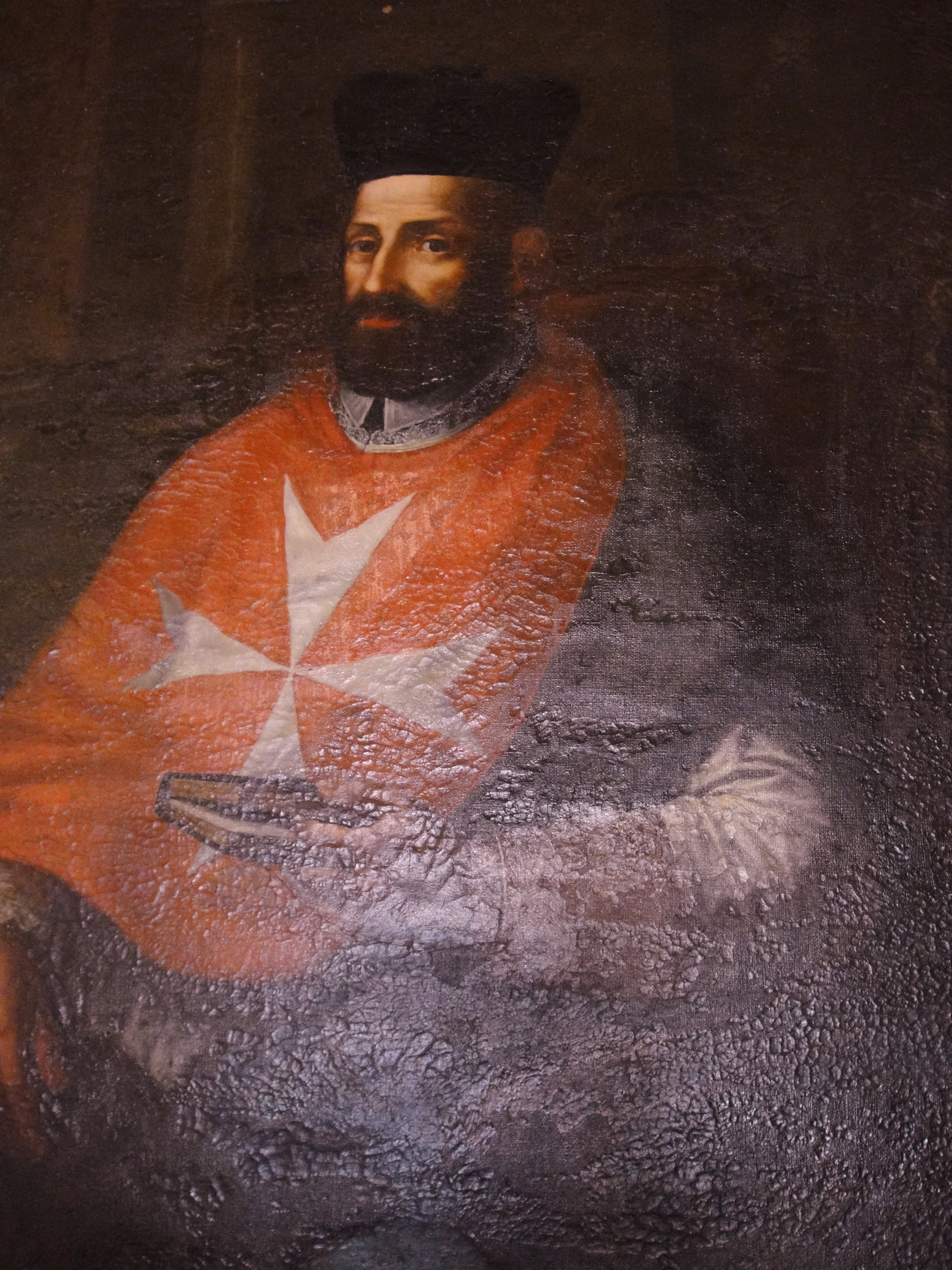
- Church: Roman Catholic
- Diocese: Malta
- Appointed: 1541
- In office: 1541-1566
- Predecessor: Tommaso Bosio
- Successor: Martín Royas de Portalrubio
- Other post: Roman Inquisitor (1562-1566)

Orders
- Consecration: 1541
- Rank: Bishop

Personal details
- Born: Spain
- Died: 22 November 1566

Domenico Cubelles (died 22 November 1566) was a Spanish Roman Catholic prelate who served as Bishop of Malta from 1541 till his death in 1566.

== Biography ==
Cubelles was born in Spain. He was the chaplain of the Knights of St John. He was also the last representative of the Medieval Inquisition in Malta. In 1541 he was appointed and consecrated bishop of Malta. He received his episcopal ordination in Sicily. He built his Episcopal Palace in Birgu which later became the Inquisitor's Palace. On 21 October 1561 Pope Pius IV established the Roman Inquisition in Malta and Cubelles was appointed as the first Inquisitor of Malta by the bull "Licet ab Initio" on 15 July 1562. Cubelles also served as bishop during the Great Siege of Malta of 1565. Bishop Cubelles dies on 22 November 1566.
