= Mdina Cathedral Museum =

- Mużew Tal-Katidral tal-Mdina
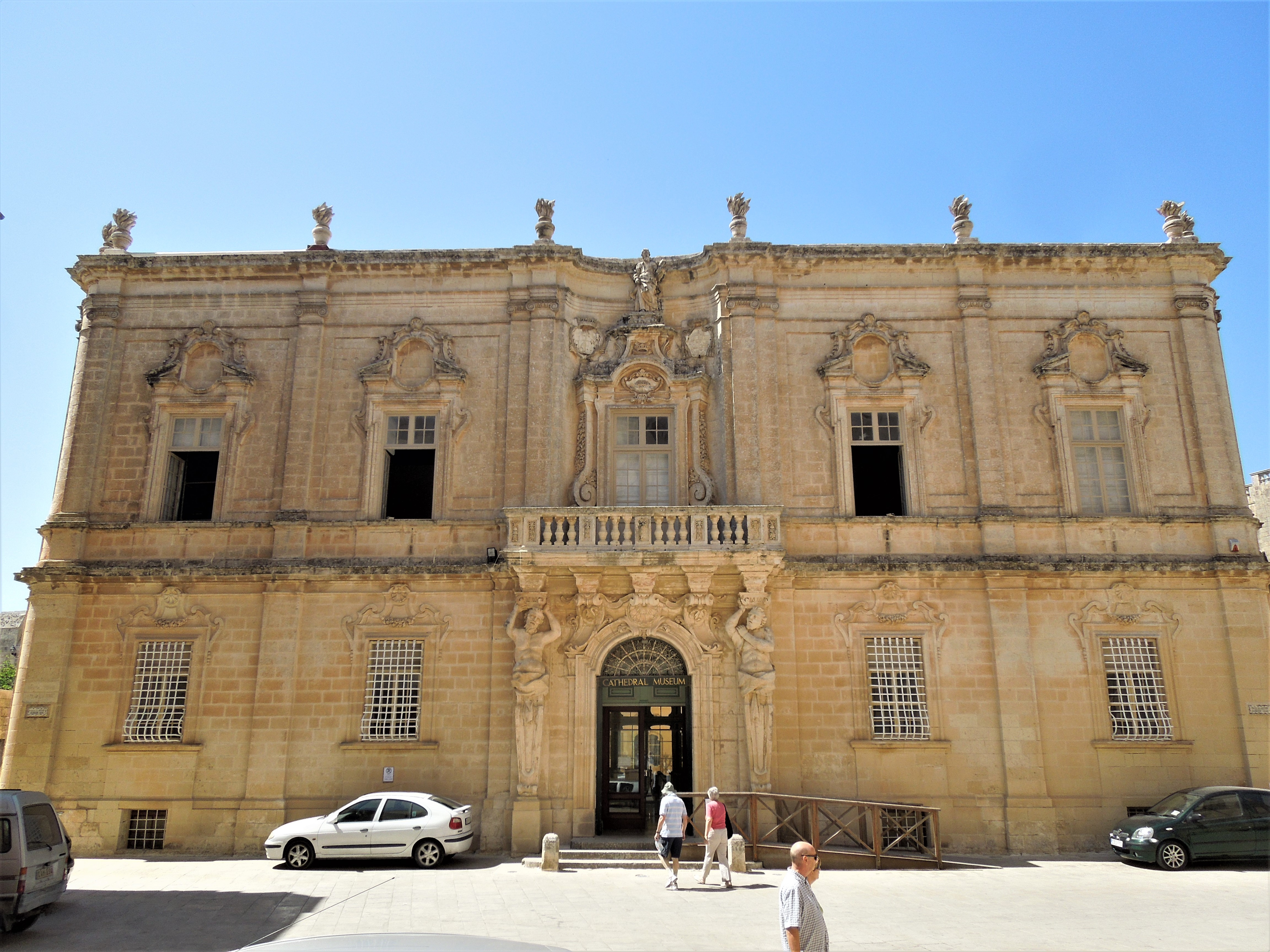
- Established: 4 January 1969
- Location: Mdina, Malta
- Coordinates: 35.8860°N 14.4040°E
- Type: Art museum
- Website: www.metropolitanchapter.com/mdina-cathedral-museum

The Mdina Cathedral Museum is a religious art museum located inside the mediaeval walled city of Mdina, Malta. The museum is housed within a Baroque building that was built as a Jesuit seminary. It can be found on the right-hand side of the St. Paul's Cathedral, in Archbishop's Square. The museum's collection includes an eclectic secular and ecclesiastical repertoire. The museum also holds various artwork and archaeology remains, including important artwork by Mattia Preti. The museum also owns the most important collection of Italian Baroque music that has been preserved south of Naples.

== History ==
On 28 March 1592, the Grand Master Cardinal Hugh De Verdalle and Bishop Mgr Tomaso Gargallo received an apostolic brief that a Jesuit seminary was to be erected in Malta. On 8 August 1616, Bishop Balthassar Cagliares opened a seminary in Mdina in which he admitted 12 pupils. They were to study, philosophy, theology, grammar and logic at the expense of the bishop himself. On 24 May 1681, a letter from the prefect of the Congregation of the Council ordered Bishop Mgr Girolamo Molina to re-establish the seminary in Mdina, by the end of the 17th century the Mdina Seminary was not functioning anymore. On 25 March 1703, Mgr Cocco Pamlieri in his palace at Valletta stipulated the foundation act and the decree for the erection of a seminary in Mdina. In the year 1733, an extensive building quarter with old medieval houses was bought to build a new bigger seminary presently the premises of the Cathedral Museum.

The French nobleman Paul Alphéran de Bussan (1728–1757) first came to Malta at the age of 19 when the ship he was travelling on was caught in heavy storms and had to seek shelter in St. Paul's Bay. Both his uncle Melchior Alpheran de Bussan and brother Jean-Melchior Alphéran were members of the Sovereign Military Order of Malta. Paul Alphéran de Bussan was appointed as Bishop of Malta on 8 March 1728. He is remembered mostly for building the Mdina seminary, now the Cathedral Museum, in 1733 as well as for financing the printing of a Maltese translation of Cardinal Bellarmino's Catholic Catechism which was distributed to every parish in Malta. The building where the museum is now was built by Bishop Alpheran de Bussan, with the first stone being laid in 1733. This building was to serve as the seminary for the Diocese of Malta. In the 16th century, the Council of Trent instituted seminaries to provide for the training of candidates for the priesthood. Twelve years after the last session of the council, Mgr. Dusina, Apostolic Visitor to Malta, decreed the erection of a seminary. Various attempts were made by the bishops of Malta to have such a purpose-built building, but it was only in 1703 that Bishop Cocco Palmieri welcomed the first seminarians to a building in Mdina.

In 1723, Bishop Mancini (1722–1727) transferred the seminary to Valletta. Bishop Fra Paolo Alpheran de Bussan and Grandmaster Manoel De Vilhena funded the building of the current edifice. The building's design is attributed to the architects Giovanni Barbara or Andrea Belli, although Barbara was already dead when construction began, leaving Belli as the more likely candidate. The Mdina Seminary was inaugurated on the 20 May 1742. At that time there were 1,679 priests in the diocese of Malta. The number of Maltese priests declined in the second half of the eighteenth century, a decline caused by the pressure that was brought about by the higher standards of education and intellectual formation that were asked of the candidates to the priesthood by the Holy See and by the Maltese ecclesiastical authorities.

In the year 1749, the artist Antoine Favrè was paid the sum of 250 scudi for his set of paintings installed within the octagonal seminary chapel dedicated to the Annunciation.

The seminary remained in Mdina till 1858, when Bishop Pace Forno, as part of a radical reform in the seminary, moved to a better central location, that of Floriana. After the seminary was moved out from Mdina, the building was used for various purposes.

During the Crimean War, the British military used the building as their headquarters. During this occupation, the British added most of the upper floor (now in use by the museum administration) by building two separate wings. The British also added fireplaces to the building, a quintessential addition during the British Victorian period. Then in 1913 British Royal Admiralty occupied the building for urgent use during World War I. Then in 1914, an additional upper storey was built upon the actual pinacoteca by the British Admiralty.

In the year 1912, the building served as unorganized storage. An issue had been raised by the cathedral chapter to restore the two paintings by the Mattia Preti de pertininza which were found neglected in one of the rooms of the seminary.

Circa 1919, the building was reused as a seminary. National poet Dun Karm Psaila lectured at Mdina. By the early 1920s, the training for aspiring priests returned to Manresa House in Floriana, the idea to use the former seminary building as a place for permanent exhibitions was discussed in Chapters Meetings of May 1926 and continued on the advent of the World War II, exactly in August 1938. In the years between 1939 and 1942, the edifice saw another change when the political vicissitudes of Malta at the time of World War II brought to Mdina Seminary the St. Edward's College students from an unsafe Cottonera area.

In the late 1940s, the building served to accommodate the nuns of the Good Shepherd while certain areas were reserved for the classes of a small private school administered by the chapter. During the years 1940's- to the early 1950s the former seminary was also used as a house of retreat. During the difficult years of World War II, the issue of the museum was shelved on the chapter's agenda. Finally, a decisive moment came after a successful exhibition with Marian exhibition of 1949 started paving the way for the making of the first professional museum.

The Mdina Cathedral Museum benefitted from the donation of the collections of Count Saverio Marchese, which made the Maltese man of letters one of the earliest Maltese art collectors to bequeath a significant portion of his collection to the public. His register of purchases, titled Primo Costo, is an invaluable document, detailing over 85 paintings, including religious works, landscapes, and still lifes.

It was Mons. Edward Coleiro who initially proposed the shift of objects from the cathedral to the Cathedral Museum. Various activities held in the former seminary building were brought to an end on 4 January 1969 with a very remarkable opening of the first official Cathedral Museum which was inaugurated by the governor of Malta Sir Maurice Dorman and Mgr Archbishop Sir Michael Gonzi.

In 1992, the Dr John A. Cauchi hall displaying his collection of paintings was opened.

On 18 November 2008, an extensive collection of antique silverware, amassed by former Speaker Jimmy Farrugia, was donated to the Cathedral Museum, Mdina. in 2010 the opening of other silver rooms (formerly used to conserve the archives) was used to accommodate Antonio Arrighi's famous Apsotolato, treasures of the Cathedral Church and treasures coming for the Church of the Holy Souls in Valletta.

== Notable exhibits ==
- The Mocking of Christ – Mattia Preti
- St Paul Preaching – Mattia Preti
- St. Jerome in his Study – Albrecht Dürer
- Allegorio dell’Amore e della Morte – Battistello
- Christ and the Apostles – Giovanni Salvo d’Antonio
- Virgin and Infant St John adoring the Child Jesus – Circle of Fra Filippo Lippi
