= Saverio Marchese =

Maltese man of letters, art collector and nobleman

Count Saverio Marchese
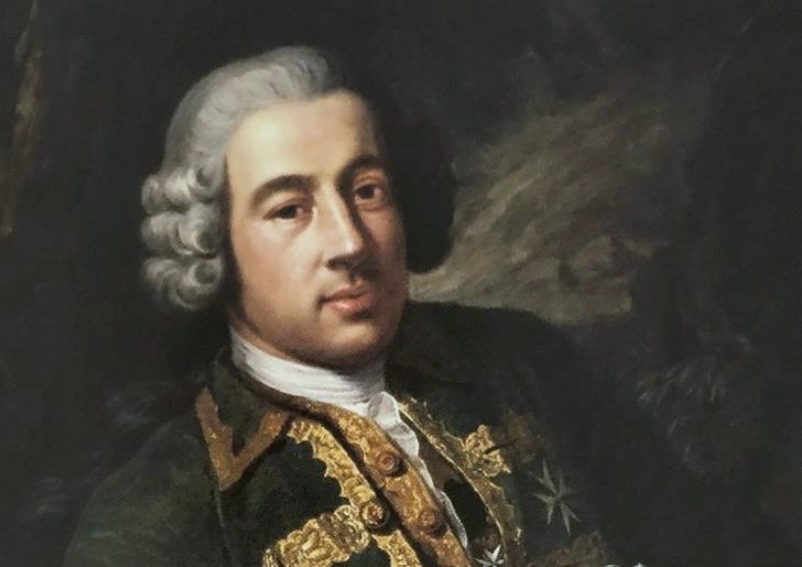
- Portrait of Count Saverio Marchese, by Antoine de Favray.
- Born: Saverio Marchese; 12 September 1757; Valletta, Malta
- Died: 25 November 1833 (aged 76)
- Spouse: Maria Camilleri Bianchi
- Parent(s): Cavaliere Giuseppe Isidoro Marchese; Serafina Marmier de Salins

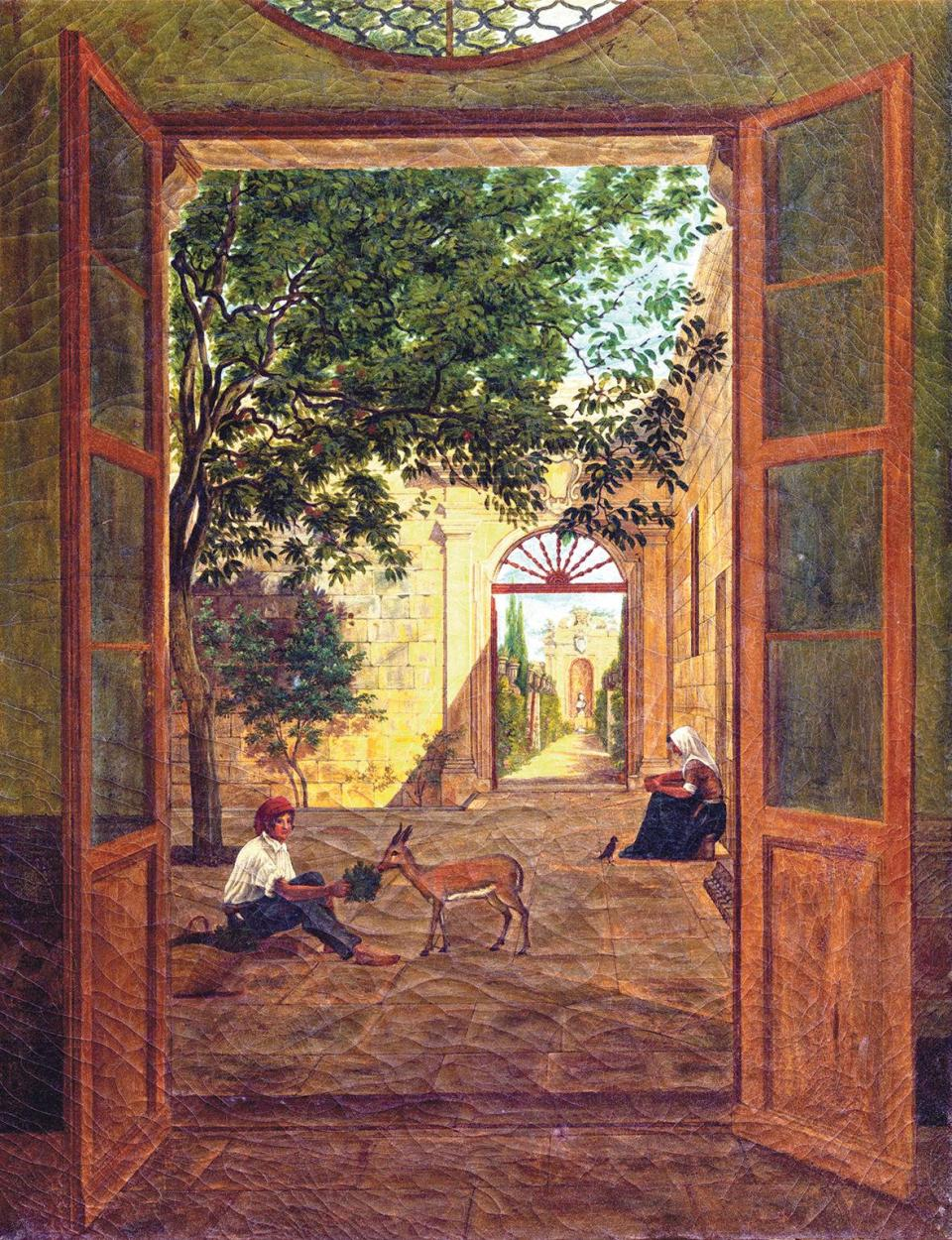
The house of Count Saverio Marchese in Attard, by Anton Shranz.

Count Saverio Marchese (12 September 1757 – 25 November 1833) was a Maltese man of letters and nobleman, known for his contributions to Maltese culture, art history, and education. Marchese cultivated interests in history, archaeology, poetry and the Maltese language, and he was also a great patron, and collector of works of art.

== Early life and education ==
Born on 12 September 1757, in Valletta, he was the fourth son of Cavaliere Giuseppe Isidoro Marchese and Serafina Marmier de Salins. Marchese played a significant role in the cultural and intellectual development of Malta during the 19th century. Marchese was educated in Rome at the prestigious Collegio Novo, run by the Piarists. While studying in Rome, he embarked on a visit to the Abbey of Monte Cassino with his uncle, Giovanni Battista Raimondo.

On 12 January 1784, he married Anna Maria Camilleri Bianchi from Senglea, with the nuptial mass celebrated by the Inquisitor Antonio Felice Zondadari in the chapel of the Holy Office, highlighting Marchese's respected position within Maltese society, and the Church.

== Noble titles and public service ==
On 8 March 1793, Emmanuel de Rohan-Polduc, Prince and 70th Grand Master of the Order of St. John, awarded him the title of Count of Maimon. Between 1805 and 1809, Marchese served as the Commissario Generale dei Beni Pubblici, overseeing public works in Malta. Shortly before his death, he was made a Knight of the Order of St. Michael and St. George.

== Contributions to literature, culture and art ==
Count Saverio Marchese was deeply involved in the cultural scene of his time. His most notable contribution was his extensive art collection, which he meticulously curated throughout his life. Marchese acquired paintings, prints, drawings, and other valuable artifacts, many of which came from prominent European artists and collectors. Among his acquisitions were prints by Albrecht Dürer, and works by Palma il Giovane, Bernardo Strozzi, and Guido Reni. He also took a keen interest in Maltese artists, such as Michele Busuttil and Giuseppe Grech, and commissioned art from painters popular in Malta, like Anton Shranz.

In addition to his contribution as an art collector, Marchese was also a poet and a scholar. His Italian poetry was highly regarded in literary circles, both in Malta and abroad. Over the years, he amassed a substantial library, the contents of which have been dispersed. The contents of this lost library included volumes on classical and contemporary literature and poetry, political theory, history books, the lives of saints and popes, travelogues, museum periodicals, illustrated guides to museums and cities, works on the lives of artists, artist monologues, and books about prints and engravers which Marchese often referred to when giving attributions to the prints he purchased. Marchese transcribed and elaborately annotated a compendium of biographies of Maltese artists and foreign artists who worked in Malta, named ‘Uomini Illustri di Malta’. Marchese was also a linguist. During the French occupation, Saverio remained in Valletta and wrote a Maltese dictionary, also preserving popular verses in Maltese, and writing sonnets. In fact, Marchese was also a poet and member of the Accademia dell’Arcadia.

=== The Cathedral Museum donation ===
Marchese's legacy in the arts is exemplified by his decision to leave his collection to a public institution, the Mdina Cathedral Museum, making him one of the earliest Maltese art collectors to bequeath a significant portion of his collection to the public. His register of purchases, titled 'Primo Costo', is an invaluable document, detailing over 85 paintings, including religious works, landscapes, and still lifes.

Marchese as a sophisticated art connoisseur, collected a vast selection of paintings, drawings and prints over the years. These were bequeathed to the Mdina Cathedral in a will dated 2 May 1831, stipulating that “these paintings, drawings and prints be deposited and preserved forever in the hall and library of the Cathedral”. Marchese is regarded as the founder of the Cathedral Museum Collection, with his donation forming the nucleus of the museum previously housed within the Cathedral itself.

The collection is today housed in the Marchese Hall at the Mdina Cathedral Museum with Marchese being a key donor whose contributions helped establish the Museum's collection. His donations include paintings, old master drawings, and engravings from the 15th and 16th centuries. The hall's centerpiece is the polyptych of St. Paul, Malta's oldest altar painting, commissioned from the Catalan school of Lluís Borrassà. It depicts the enthronement of St. Paul along with various scenes from the saint's life.

== Death and legacy ==
In his later years, Marchese was appointed to several important educational committees, including the committee to reform the University of Studies and the General Council of the university in 1824, under the chairmanship of John Hookham Frere. Saverio Marchese died on 25 November 1833. His death was considered a great loss to Maltese society. He is buried in the family tomb at the parish church in Attard.

The Malta Government Gazette's tribute on his death, marked how "As a nobleman of great erudition and well versed in ancient and modern literature no less than for the urbanity of his disposition and pleasing manners, his friendship was always sought and valued, by the most distinguished residents in Malta, both native and English. In Italian poetry, his compositions have been read in public and private circles, with delight and admiration and his taste for the fine arts attracted to his house visits from the most distinguished foreigners that have from time to time landed in our islands and who never failed to express their high sense of his accomplishments and political refinement."

== Bibliography ==
- Azzopardi, John (1982). Count Saverio Marchese (1757-1833): his Picture-Gallery and his Bequest to the Cathedral Museum (PDF). Malta: Melita Historica.
- Farrugia, Kyrstle (2012). Count Saverio Marchese (1757 - 1833) : art history and artistic preferences in later 18th and early 19th century Malta (Thesis). University of Malta.
- Vella, A. (1969). The University of Malta - A Bicentenary Memorial, Malta.
