= Miguel Juan Balaguer =

Spanish Roman Catholic prelate

His Excellency Miguel Juan Balaguer de Camarasa O.S.Io.Hieros.
- Bishop of Malta
- Church: Roman Catholic
- Diocese: Malta
- Appointed: 12 February 1635
- In office: 1635-1663
- Predecessor: Baldassare Cagliares
- Successor: Lucas Buenos

Orders
- Consecration: 18 February 1635 by Francesco Maria Brancaccio
- Rank: Bishop

Personal details
- Born: 1597 Camarasa, Spain
- Died: 5 December 1663 (age 66) Malta

Miguel Juan Balaguer de Camarasa also known as Miguel Balaguer or Michele Balaguer (1597 – 5 December 1663) was a Spanish Roman Catholic prelate who served as Bishop of Malta from 1635 to 1663.

== Biography ==
Miguel Juan Balaguer Camarasa was born in Camarasa, in Spain. Upon the death of Bishop Baldassare Cagliares, Grandmaster Antoine de Paule and the council recommended that Balaguer be appointed bishop of Malta. Pope Urban VIII accepted Balaguer's nomination and formally appointed him to the see of Malta on February 12, 1635. He was ordained bishop on February 18, 1635 and installed as Bishop of Malta on March 25, 1635.

During his episcopacy Balaguer donated a wooden crucifix by Innocenzo da Petralia Soprano (1592-1648), a Franciscan friar from Sicily which today is found in the Chapel of the Holy Crucifix in St. Paul's Cathedral, Mdina. Also Bishop Balaguer consecrated the oldest bell in Malta dating from Medieval times. The bell, christened Petronilla was, reconsecrated on August 7, 1645 and installed in its place in the cathedral's belfry.

His episcopacy is characterised with accusations and conflict with lay persons, the Inquisitors and the knights. There were numerous occasions where Bishop Balaguer was about to resign though at the same time he was needed to reform the much slacking diocese. He had a rather long episcopacy of 28 years. He died as a result of a stroke on December 5, 1663 at the age of 66.
