= Tomás Gargallo =

Spanish Roman Catholic prelate

His Excellency Tomás Gargallo O.S.Io.Hieros.
- Bishop of Malta
- Church: Roman Catholic
- Diocese: Malta
- Appointed: 11 August 1578
- In office: 1578–1614
- Predecessor: Martín Rojas de Portalrubio
- Successor: Baldassare Cagliares

Orders
- Consecration: 1578
- Rank: Bishop

Personal details
- Born: 1536
- Died: 10 August 1614 (aged 77–78)

Tomás Gargallo (1536 – 10 June 1614) was a Spanish Roman Catholic prelate who became the Bishop of Malta in 1578.

== Biography ==
Gargallo was born in Catalonia, Spain, in 1536. Gargallo was appointed as Bishop of Malta by Pope Gregory XIII on 11 August 1578. He was consecrated bishop in Palermo. Whilst in Malta, Gargallo ruled with fear, to the point where no one dared to stand up to him. Consequently, there were clashes with the Inquisition in Malta and he was suspended by Inquisitor Cefalotto in 1582, as a result of his harsh rule. Gargallo also experienced financial difficulties whilst Bishop of Malta. Gargallo welcomed the newly formed order of the Jesuits to Malta. He also established a number of parishes, notably, St Paul's parish, St Dominic's parish and Our Lady of Damascus Greek Catholic parish, all in Valletta. He also established the parishes of Senglea, Cospicua, Kirkop, Safi, Mqabba, Lija, Mosta, Gharghur, and Tarxien. Gargallo died on 10 June 1614 after an episcopate of 36 years.
