= Baldassare Cagliares =

Maltese Roman Catholic prelate

His Excellency Baldassare Cagliares O.S.Io.Hieros.
- Bishop of Malta
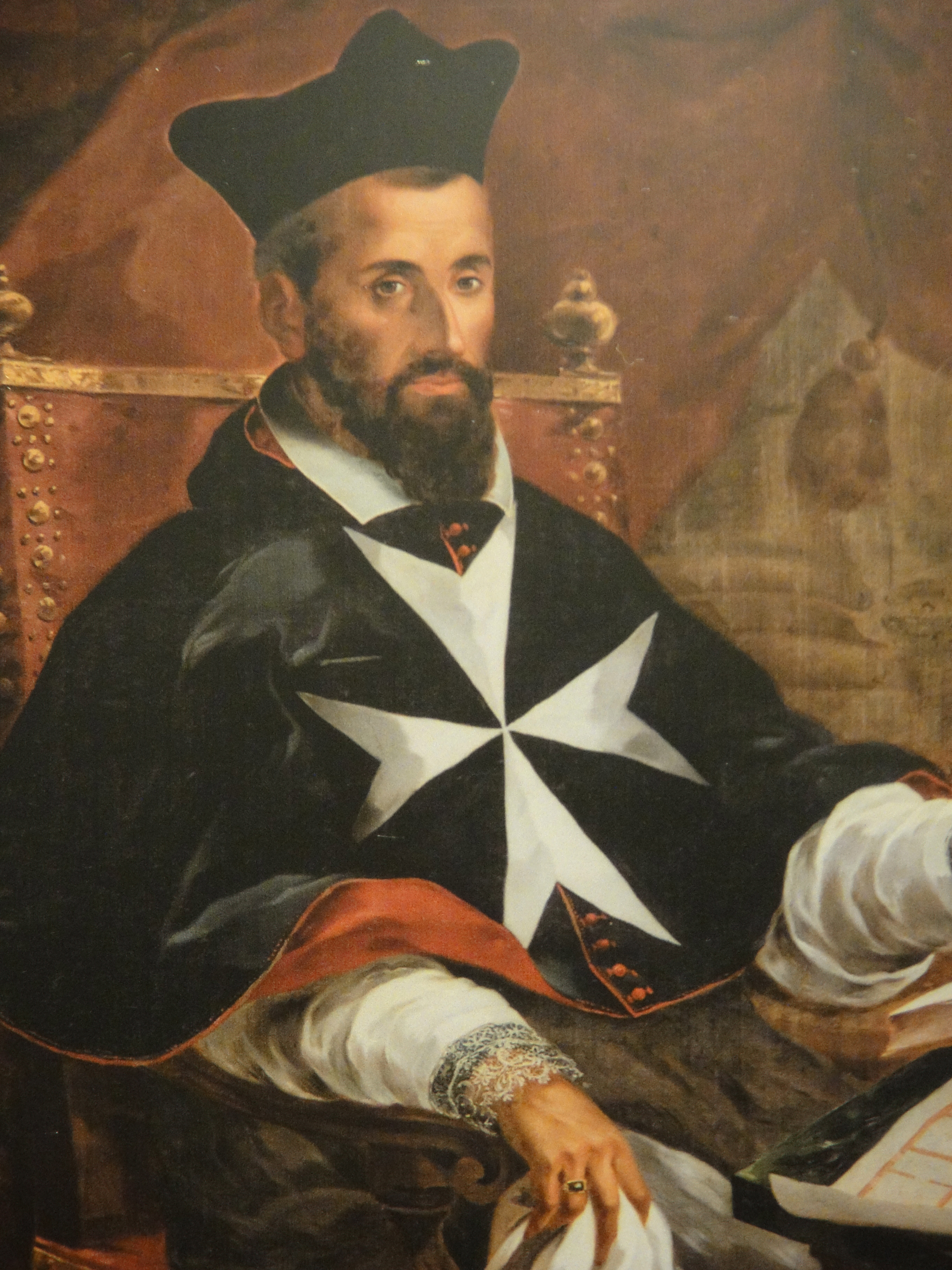
- Church: Roman Catholic
- Diocese: Malta
- Appointed: 18 May 1615
- In office: 1615–1633
- Predecessor: Tomás Gargallo
- Successor: Miguel Juan Balaguer Camarasa

Orders
- Consecration: 1615
- Rank: Bishop

Personal details
- Born: c. 1575 Valletta, Hospitaller Malta
- Died: 4 August 1633

Baldassare Cagliares (c. 1575 – 4 August 1633) was a Maltese Roman Catholic prelate who was the Bishop of Malta from 1615 until his death.

== Biography ==
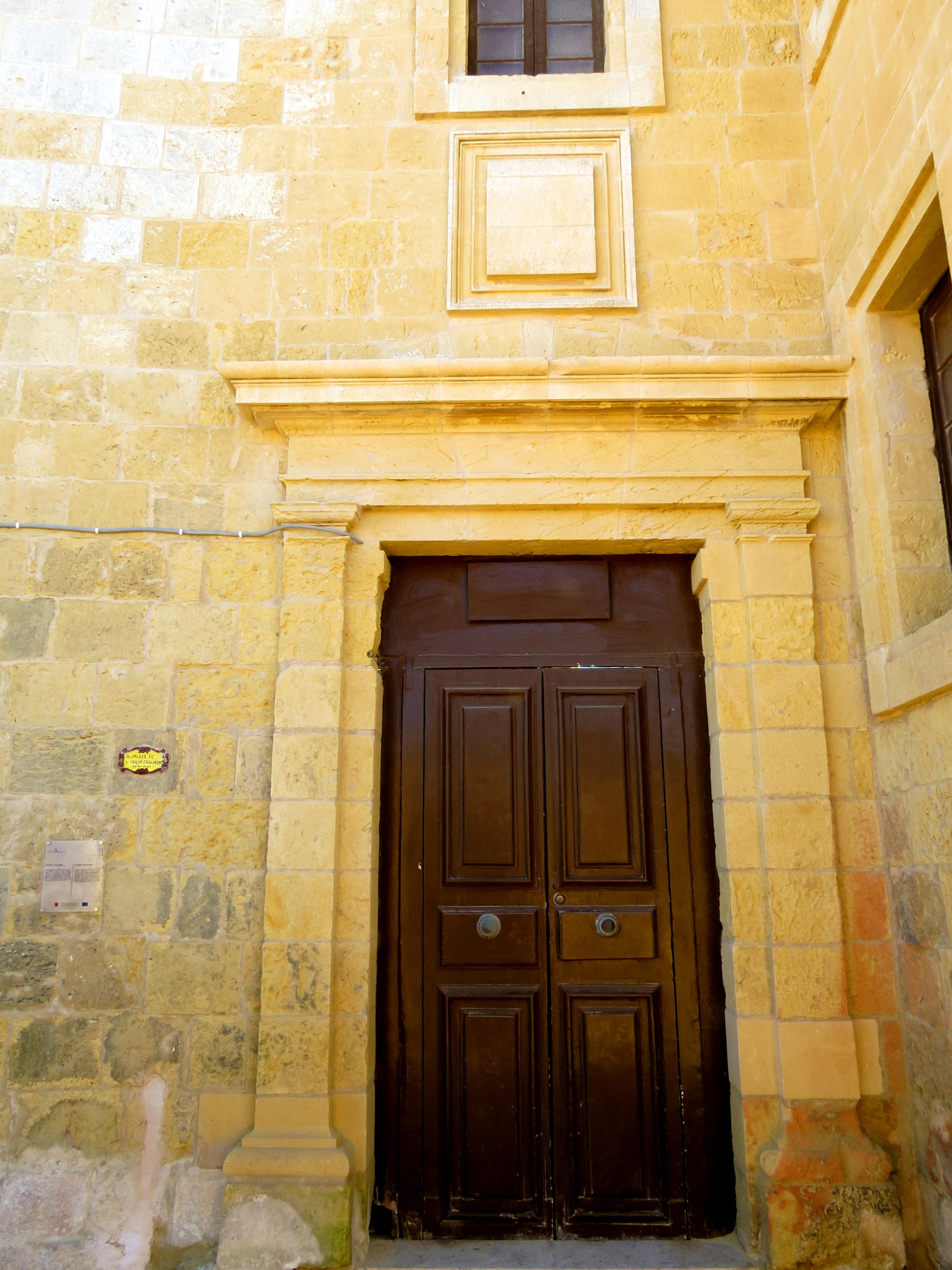
Cagliares Palace at the Cittadella, built in 1620

Baldassare Cagliares was born in Valletta in around 1575; this year is approximate and the exact day and month are not known. His father was of Spanish descent and his mother was a Maltese from Rabat, Gozo.

Cagliares was appointed as Bishop of Malta by Pope Paul V in 1615, when he was 40 years old. Cagliares was a person who loved art and lived in a period when the church and state were competing to carry out the best works of art. He was also the only Maltese Bishop chosen to lead the Diocese of Malta when Malta was under the rule of the Order of St John between 1530 and 1798.

During his episcopate, he built the Bishop's Palace in Valletta and numerous residences in various localities around Malta such as in Żejtun, the Cittadella in Gozo and Buskett.

Cagliares also established a number of parishes such as that of Qrendi in 1618 and restored the parish of Dingli by appointing a rector for the local church of the village which was left without a priest for a number of years.

Cagliares died on 4 August 1633 at the age of 58 after 18 years as bishop.
