= Armed Forces of Malta =

- Forzi Armati ta' Malta
- The coat of arms of the Armed Forces of Malta.

- Flag of the Armed Forces of Malta.
- Founded: 19 April 1973; 53 years ago
- Service branches: Headquarters; 1st Regiment; 3rd Regiment; 4th Regiment; Air Wing; Maritime Squadron
- Headquarters: Safi Luqa barracks, Ħal Luqa
- Website: Official Website

Leadership
- President of Malta: Myriam Spiteri Debono
- Minister for Home Affairs, Security and Employment: Glenn Bedingfield MP
- Commander of the Armed Forces: Brigadier Clinton J O'Neill

Personnel
- Military age: 18 years of age
- Conscription: No
- Active personnel: 1,500

Expenditure
- Budget: €112,6 millions (2023)
- Percent of GDP: 0.52% of the GDP (2023)

Industry
- Foreign suppliers: Czech Republic; France; Germany; Israel; Italy; Poland; Sweden; Switzerland; United Kingdom; United States

Related articles
- History: Military history of Malta; King's Own Malta Regiment; National Congress Battalions
- Ranks: Military ranks of Malta

The Armed Forces of Malta (Maltese: Forzi Armati ta' Malta) is the name given to the combined armed services of Malta. The AFM is a brigade sized organisation consisting of a headquarters and three separate regiments, with minimal air and naval forces. Since Malta is the guardian of the European Union's southernmost European border, the AFM has an active role in border control.

== History ==
In April 1800, while the blockade of Valletta was underway, Thomas Graham raised the first official Maltese Troops in the British Army, which became known as the Maltese Light Infantry. This battalion was disbanded in 1802 and succeeded by the Maltese Provincial Battalions, the Malta Coast Artillery and the Maltese Veterans. In 1815, Lieutenant Colonel Count Francis Rivarola was entrusted with the task of raising the Royal Malta Fencible Regiment following the disbandment of the Provincials, Veterans and Coast Artillery. The Royal Malta Fencible Regiment was converted to an artillery regiment in 1861 and became known as the Royal Malta Fencible Artillery. Twenty-eight years later, the direct predecessors of the modern Armed Forces of Malta came into existence following the formation of the Royal Malta Artillery on 23 March 1889.

The King's Own Malta Regiment was a territorial infantry regiment on the British Army colonial list. It was formed in 1801 as the "Regiment of Maltese Militia" and existed only until the following year. It was reformed as the "Maltese Militia" by Sir Adrian Dingli in 1852 before being disbanded again in 1857. It was raised again, this time as the "Royal Malta Regiment of Militia" in 1889; this regiment was considered to be the successor to the "Maltese Chasseurs" of the early 19th century. The regiment was renamed the "King's Own Royal Malta Regiment of Militia" in 1903 and was disbanded in 1921. The regiment was raised for a fourth time in 1931 as the "King's Own Malta Regiment". Initially, in the British Establishment, in 1951, it was transferred to the Malta Territorial Force before becoming part of the Malta Land Force on Malta's independence in 1964. The regiment was disbanded in 1972.

The AFM was formed upon Malta becoming a republic in 1974, when 1 Regiment Royal Malta Artillery was renamed as 1 Regiment, AFM. This initially continued the artillery role, with 2 Regiment formed as an engineering unit. In 1980, 1 Regiment became a mixed unit, with infantry, aircraft and maritime responsibilities, the artillery element being transferred to 2 Regiment. In 1992, there was a major re-organisation, which led to the formation of 3 Regiment and the current structure.

=== KOMR Battle Honours ===
- 1800 (awarded for services of the Maltese Chasseurs)
- 1882 (Egypt)
- Second World War: Malta 1940–1942

=== Current Modernisation ===
Based on recent budget announcements and military updates for 2025–2026, the Armed Forces of Malta (AFM) is undergoing a significant modernisation phase focused on infrastructure, aerial capabilities, and personnel recruitment. Key upgrades include:

Aerial and Maritime Fleet Expansion: By 2028, the AFM is set to acquire a new helicopter and a new fixed-wing aircraft. Additionally, a contract was announced in late 2025 for a fourth Beechcraft B200GT Super King Air for maritime patrol and a fourth AgustaWestland AW139 helicopter.

Infrastructure Improvements: A major Air Wing Infrastructure Project is nearing inauguration, marking a key milestone in national air defence capability. Ongoing investments are enhancing the basing facilities. Special Operations and Equipment: A new Special Operations Unit (SOU) has been established to consolidate special warfare tasks, with ongoing upgrades to individual weaponry and the disposal of older equipment. The bomb disposal unit is receiving new high-tech robots. Personnel and Training: Recruitment: Intake 261 in January 2026 welcomed 88 new recruits to bolster troop numbers. Training: New pilots have recently completed 2.5-year training courses, and specialized training (such as advanced climbing) is being conducted with foreign partners, including Italy. Compensation: A new sectoral agreement was signed in 2025 to improve pay and conditions for AFM members.

These upgrades are part of a broader "national security investment" exceeding €10 million aimed at enhancing maritime and aerial surveillance capabilities to match evolving regional challenges.

== Organisation ==
=== Headquarters, AFM ===
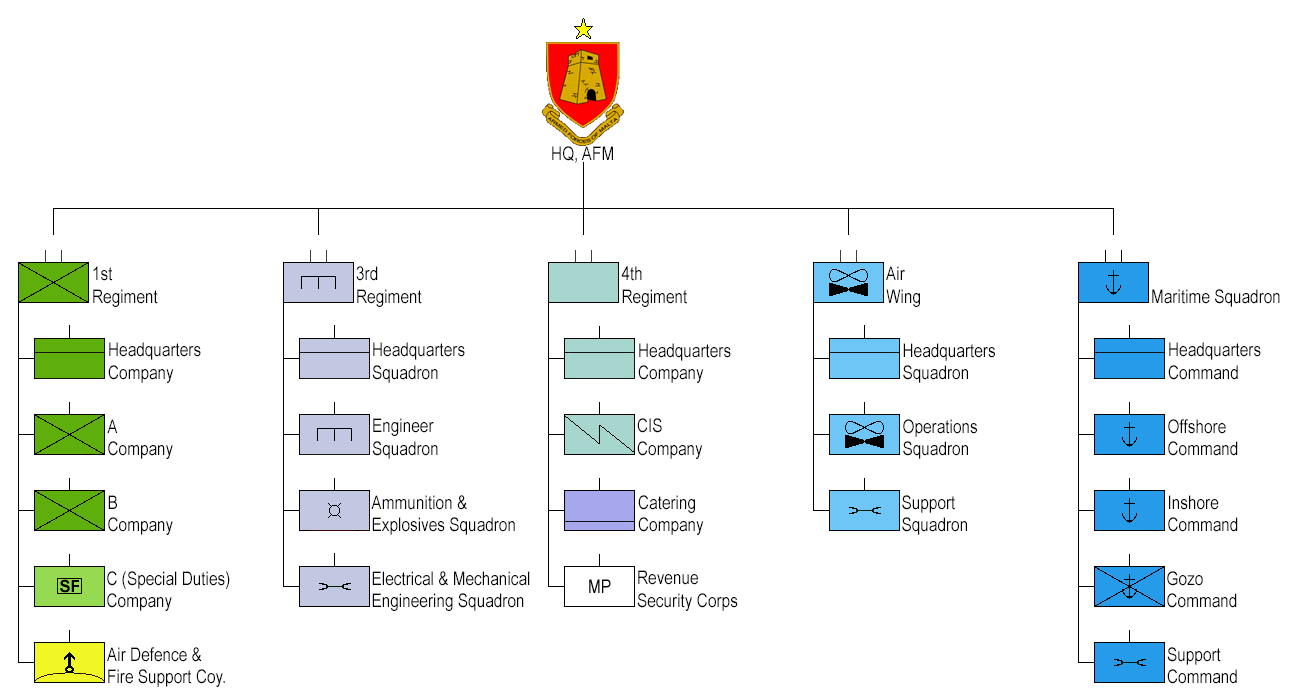
Structure of the Armed Forces of Malta

HQ AFM is the Force Headquarters located at Luqa Barracks, Luqa. It is a joint Headquarters that operates at the military strategic as well as the operational and tactical levels.

HQ AFM is composed of the following branches:

- Human Resources Management Branch
- International Affairs Branch
- Operations, Plans and Intelligence Branch
- Integrated Logistics Branch
- Capabilities and Training Branch
- Financial Management Branch
- Property Management & Development Branch

=== 1st Regiment, AFM ===
1st Regiment

1st Regiment is Malta's infantry unit, and has primary responsibility for the territorial defence of the country. It is divided into three rifle companies, a support company and a headquarters company.

- Headquarters Company – provides combat service support to the other manoeuvre subunits of the unit. The orbat consists of a Company Headquarters (CHQ), Motor Transport section, Pioneer section, Regimental Police section, Signals section, Armoury section and Quartermaster Section.
- A Company – is responsible for airport security in the controlled access role by providing security guards at terminal access points/airfield perimeter gates leading to restricted areas and by conducting patrols in these said areas. They also enforce access passes and visitor movement control assisted with CCTV surveillance and is based at Malta International Airport.
- B Company – is responsible for security duties in various locations. It carries out land patrols and conducts vehicle checkpoints for traffic contraventions, illegal immigrants' identification and apprehension, and anti-narcotics' searches. It liaises very closely with the police in relation to many of their activities. In addition, it is an internal security company, tasked with guarding high-profile/sensitive government establishments, and is based at Ħal Far.
- C Company – is the AFM's Quick Reaction Force, for high-risk operations both internally and as part of the European Union. It also serves as an infantry training unit for the AFM and is based at Ħal Far.
- D Company - a new company was noted on a video released by AFM, not much is known about their purpose but their motto "NUNTRUM COMPARAT ET CUSTODIT" means "Providing and Protecting Information" so it could be recon-oriented company. They seem to be well equipped similar to C Company and can be seen using drones and snipers. More needs to be learned about this new company.
- All the AFM ceremonial activities that involve the firing of the saluting guns are performed by this sub-unit. This sub-unit is also responsible for the administration and training of the Emergency Volunteer Reserve Force.
- Battle Honours
  - Anglo-Egyptian War
  - Operation Atalanta
  - EUTM Somalia

=== 3rd Regiment, AFM ===
3 Regiment is the AFM's main support unit, and consists of three operational sections.

- Engineer Squadron – this provides the engineering support.
- Ammunition and Explosives Company – is responsible for the storage and control of all types of ammunition held by the AFM as well as for the storage and control of blasting material used by civilian contractors for quarry blasting, etc. It includes the Explosive Ordnance Disposal (EOD) section which is responsible for the detection and disposal of bombs and other explosive devices. It is also responsible for the inspection of mail at major post offices, inspection of baggage and aircraft at the airport and security checks at the house of Representative
- Electrical and Mechanical Engineering Squadron – is responsible for the repair and maintenance of all AFM vehicles, generators, plant and other service equipment.

=== 4th Regiment, AFM ===
Established with the AFM review of 30 October 2006, it includes:

- HQ Company
- Armed Forces of Malta Ceremonial Drill Team – Since its re-establishment on 1 August 2014, the AFM Ceremonial Drill Team has performed synchronized drill displays in different events in events connected with the AFM. The team is platoon sized and is composed of 21 soldiers from different units within the AFM.
- The AFM Band – Established in 1970, the AFM Band takes part in official engagements, performing at ceremonial parades, band displays and other band programmes in Malta and Gozo. Besides their duties as bandsmen, the personnel also perform all military duties.
- Revenue Security Corps – assists Government in the prevention of smuggling, the protection of revenue and, when necessary, the investigation of contraventions relating to fiscal and monetary laws. The RSC is also responsible for the security and cash escort duties of commercial banks.
- C2S Company – responsible for the entire communication of the Armed Forces of Malta. Operates the operation center for S&R, internal & external communications, landlines, & IT services.
- Training School – Training and Development. Initial training (BMT & Cadetship) and career development (JNCOs & SNCOs).

=== Air Wing of the Armed Forces of Malta ===
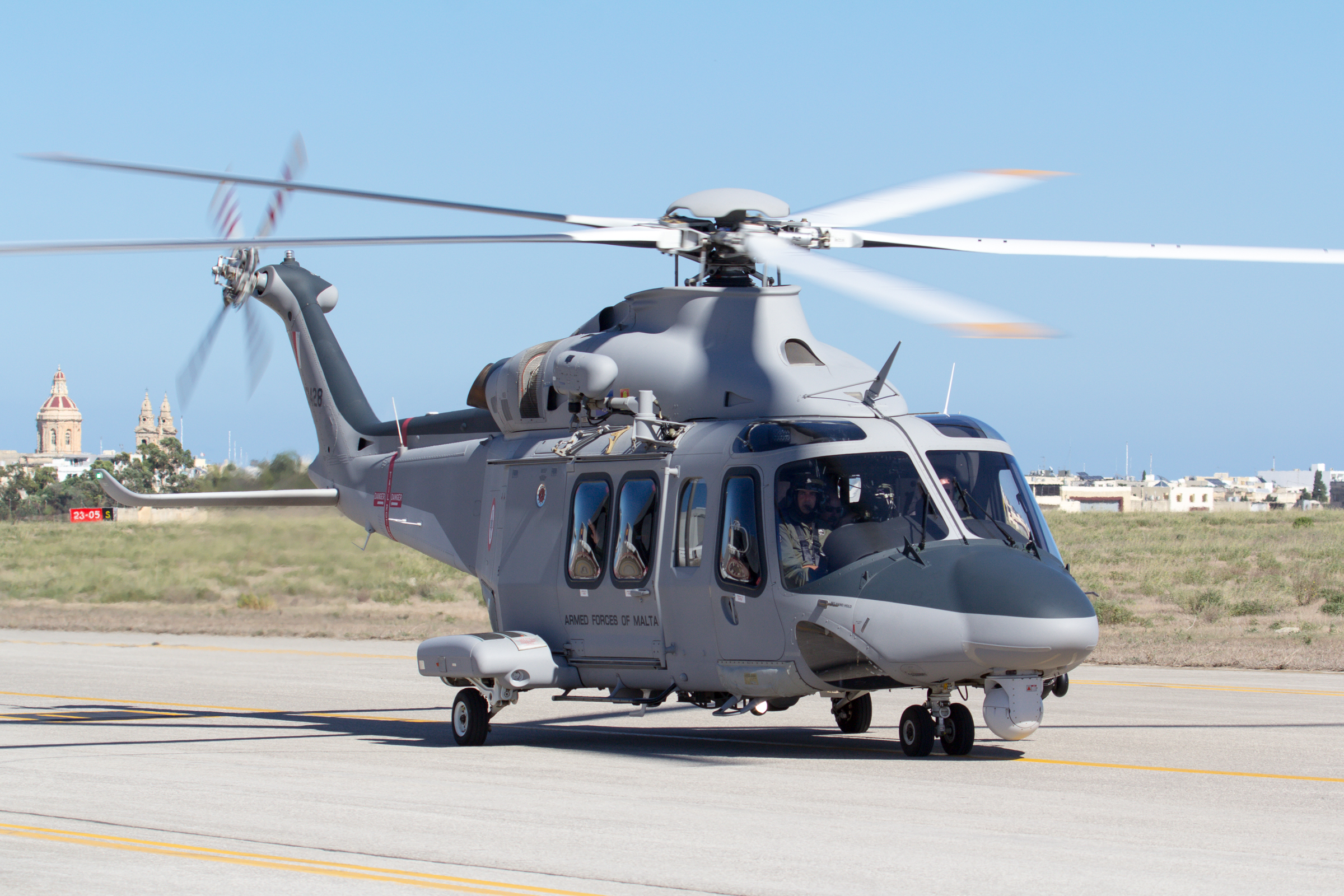
Armed Forces of Malta AgustaWestland AW139 AS1428 at the 2015 Malta International Airshow

The Air Wing of the Armed Forces of Malta is the aerial component of the current Maltese military. The Air Wing has responsibility for the security of Maltese airspace, conducts maritime patrol and search and rescue duties, and provides military assistance to other government departments of Malta. The Air Wing is based at Malta International Airport.

=== Maritime Squadron ===
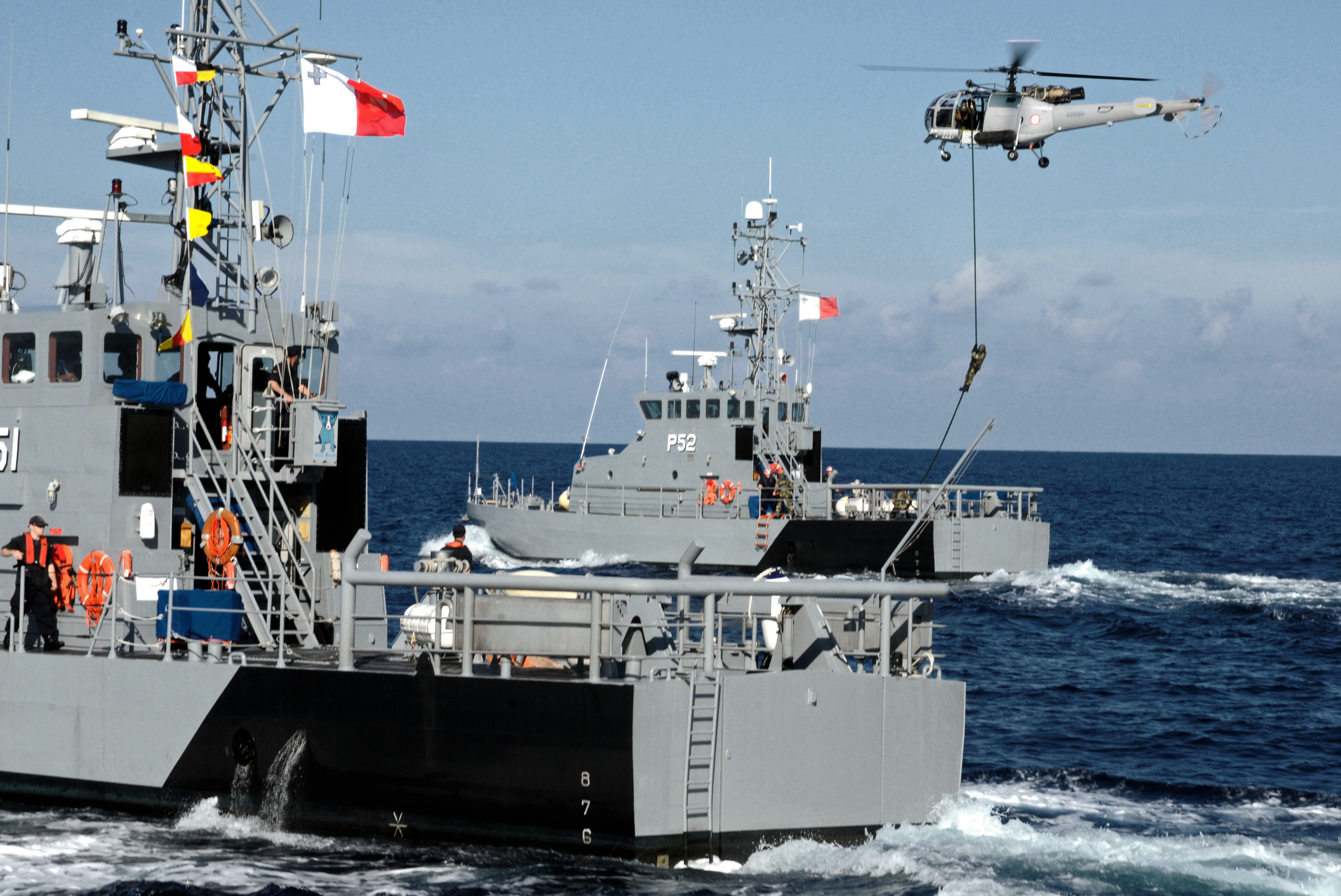
Protector-class patrol boats on anti-piracy training mission in 2011

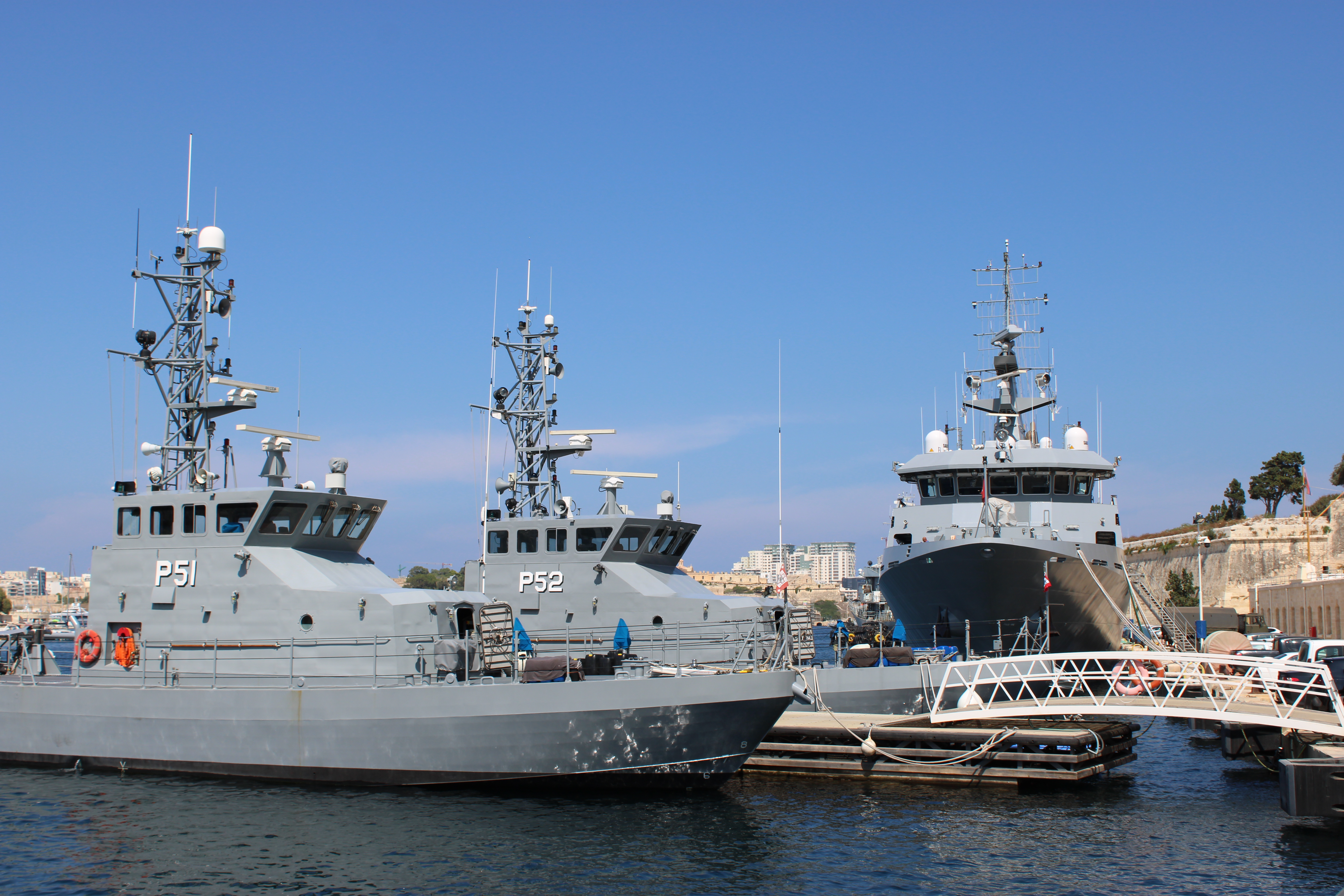
Malta armed forces ships

The Maritime Squadron of the Armed Forces of Malta is the naval component of the current Maltese military. The Maritime Squadron has responsibility for the security of Maltese territorial waters, maritime surveillance and law enforcement, as well as search and rescue. It is based at Hay Wharf (Xatt it-Tiben) in Floriana. It currently operates 10 patrol vessels and 6 other boats.

=== Volunteer Reserve Force ===
In addition to the regular forces, there is also the Volunteer Reserve Force, which consists of part-time volunteers to support the regulars.

=== Italian Military Mission Malta ===
The presence of the Italian Military Mission (IMM) in Malta has taken form in the shape of technical assistance spread over three periods of time; firstly, between 1973 and 1979, then between 1981 and July 1988, and lastly from July 1988 to 7 November 2016, when its last helicopter left Malta.

IMM personnel resources in Malta totalled 12 officers and 35 NCOs from the three service branches of the Italian Armed Forces. It was also equipped with two AB 212 helicopters, 15 heavy plant vehicles, 60 light all-purpose utility vehicles, radio telecommunications, and weapons.

== Personnel ==
The Armed Forces of Malta mainly consist of professional soldiers. There are also a small number of reserve soldiers. Malta does not employ conscription. Volunteers, who want to enlist, need to be citizens of Malta, and between 18–30 years old. In 2017, there were roughly 1,950 active personnel and 180 reservists.

== Operations ==
Since Malta's entry in the European Union, the AFM has become more engaged in peacekeeping missions. The AFM has participated in 7 overseas operations.

- United Nations
  - UNIFIL, 2007, 2018–2026 (Lebanon)
- European Union
  - EUMM Georgia, since 2008 (Georgia)
  - EUNAVFOR Atalanta, since 2008 (Gulf of Aden)
  - EUBAM Rafah, since 2009 (Gaza–Egypt border)
  - EUTM Somalia, since 2010 (Somalia)
  - EUFOR Libya, 2011 (Libya)
  - EUNAVFOR Med, since 2015 (Mediterranean Sea)
  - Frontex Joint Operation (JO) NAUTILUS, 2006 (Mediterranean Sea)
  - Frontex Joint Operation (JO) POSEIDON, since 2007 (Greece)
  - Frontex Joint Operation (JO), 2013 (Bulgaria)
  - Frontex Situation Centre, 2018 (Poland)
- Turkey
  - Maritime Control Operation and Maritime Safety Training with Turkish Armed Forces, July 2020

== Equipment ==
On land, 1 Regiment is the designated home of the Maltese Infantry with C (Special Duties) Company being at the cutting edge of this unit. The company is being trained and equipped to be able to contribute a platoon for overseas humanitarian and rescue missions attached to an Italian regiment on missions mandated by the UN or the OSCE. Malta has to ensure that the troops are trained and equipped up to Italian army standards for integration within an Italian regiment, able to tackle any foreseeable problems for up to a year. C (Special Duties) Company is also being geared for a quick reaction role, ready for action at a moment's notice should an emergency situation arise.

The kit used by the Maltese foot soldier has changed drastically in recent years. The fiat for change was given to C Company prior to its successful participation in the multi-national Partnership for Peace exercise in 1996. Following Malta's pledge towards the EU's Military Headline Goal in 2000, procurement received another boost.

With funding being a perennial problem, over the years the Force had to rely on varied equipment transferred or financed by several countries. Standardisation was a headache. But matters have improved considerably, especially with regard to light infantry weapons. At one time there were as many as eight different types of pistol and associated ammunition, now there are two, principally the Beretta FS and some Makarov. The army has also bought Heckler and Koch sub-machine guns and, thanks to Chinese assistance, all infantrymen now have their own individual AKM rifle.

The Maltese Infantry soldier is equipped with the latest British Army issue Personal Load Bearing Equipment including both the webbing and bergen as well as the woodland pattern battle dress uniform, Avon S10 respirator and Kevlar ballistic helmet. Protective ballistic vests and night vision goggles are carried when required.

Infantry soldiers have a number of weapons at their disposal including the Kalashnikov AK-47 and AKM rifles, the Heckler and Koch MP-5 sub-machine guns, the Beretta 92 FS pistols, the PKM machine gun, as well as the General Purpose Machine Gun L7A1. Sniper teams are equipped with the Accuracy International sniper rifle while the anti-tank troops embedded within the infantry platoons carry the RPG-7 rocket launcher.

Several variants of the AKM rifle have been modernized by FAB Defense, along with the use of renewable personnel combat equipment from the UK. In addition, the 1st Regiment also adopted the SIG MCX, a new assault rifle for use in special operations. Considering that the AK assault rifle is too powerful and is considered less suitable for CQB.

Eight-man sections are deployed either on Land Rovers or Iveco VM-90 trucks. The AFM also operates a number of Bedford trucks which, despite their age, still give excellent service. Suffice to say that these trucks were driven in convoys all the way to Kosovo and back three times in 2001 and not one of them broke down. The Explosives Ordnance Disposal Unit is equipped with two remote controlled Explosive Ordnance Disposal Vehicles – robots used to disable a bomb from a safe distance. The first was bought in 1989 and a second, much more sophisticated one, was bought last year.

The Air Defence Battery forms part of 1st Regiment and operates Bofors 40L/70 anti-aircraft guns and four barrelled ZSU-4 heavy machine guns. The Bofors guns can be operated either manually or electrically and they can be laid on their targets either visually or through radar. The 14.5mm machine guns can only be operated manually but they provide a high rate of fire. Air defence posed particular problems because of the passage of time on the Bofors guns, built in the early 1950s.

=== Aircraft ===
See: AFM aircraft

=== Maritime patrol vessels ===
See: AFM maritime patrol vessels

=== Small arms ===
Name	Image	Caliber	Type	Origin	Notes
Pistols
TT-30/33		7.62×25mm	Semi-automatic pistol	Soviet Union	
PM		9×18mm	Semi-automatic pistol	Soviet Union	
Beretta 92FS		9×19mm	Semi-automatic pistol	Italy	
Glock		9×19mm	Semi-automatic pistol	Austria	Glock 17 and 19 variants
Submachine guns
Uzi		9×19mm	Submachine gun	Israel	
Beretta M12		9×19mm	Submachine gun	Italy	
Heckler & Koch MP5		9×19mm	Submachine gun	Germany	MP5A4, MP5A5 and MP5K variants
Sterling		9×19mm	Submachine gun	United Kingdom	
Rifles
AKM		7.62×39mm	Assault rifle	Soviet Union	
Type 56		7.62×39mm	Assault rifle	China	
Type 58		7.62×39mm	Assault rifle	North Korea	
SIG MCX		5.56×45mm	Assault rifle Carbine	United States	Used by 1st Regiment C Company
FN FAL		7.62×51mm	Battle rifle	Belgium	
L1A1		7.62×51mm	Battle rifle	United Kingdom	Used as a ceremonial weapon
SKS		7.62×39mm	Semi-automatic rifle	Soviet Union	Mostly limited to use as a ceremonial weapon
Lee-Enfield		.303 British	Bolt-action	United Kingdom	Mostly limited to use as a ceremonial weapon
Sniper rifles
Heckler & Koch HK417		7.62×51mm NATO	Designated marksman rifle	Germany	
AWSM		.338 Lapua Magnum.300 Winchester Magnum	Bolt-action; Sniper rifle	United Kingdom	
Machine guns
RPD		7.62×39mm	Squad automatic weapon	Soviet Union	
RPK		7.62×39mm	Squad automatic weapon	Soviet Union	
FN Minimi		5.56×45mm NATO	Light machine gun	Belgium	
Type 80		7.62×54mmR	General-purpose machine gun	China	
L7A1		7.62×51mm	General-purpose machine gun	Belgium; United Kingdom	
Browning M1919		7.62×54mmR	Medium machine gun	United States	
Browning M2		.50 BMG	Heavy machine gun	United States	
KPV		14.5×114mm	Heavy machine gun	Soviet Union; North Korea	
DShK		12.7×108mm	Heavy machine gun	Soviet Union	
Rocket propelled grenade launchers
RPG-7		40mm	Rocket-propelled grenade	Soviet Union	

=== Utility vehicles ===
Name	Image	Type	Origin	Quantity	Notes
Land Rover Defender		Utility vehicle	United Kingdom	Unknown	110 and 300TDI
Isuzu D-Max 4WD		Utility vehicle	Japan	23	
Iveco VM 90		Utility vehicle	Italy	Unknown	
Trucks
Iveco ACM 90		Utility truck	Italy	Unknown	
Iveco Daily		Utility van	Italy	Unknown	
Ford F-350		Utility truck	United States	2	Delivered by United States

=== Artillery ===
Name	Image	Type	Origin	Quantity	Notes
Mortars
Type 53		Infantry mortar	Soviet Union; China	26	Delivered by China
L16		Mortar	United Kingdom; Canada	Unknown	
Field artillery
QF 25		Field gun	United Kingdom	Unknown	Ceremonial purposes/in reserve

=== Air defence systems ===
Name	Image	Type	Origin	Quantity	Notes
ZPU-4		Anti-aircraft gun	Soviet Union	50	Delivered by North Korea from 1986
Bofors L/60		Autocannon	Sweden	Unknown	

=== Uniform and personal equipment ===
Make	Origin	Type
US MultiCam	United States	Battledress
US Woodland	United States	Battledress
Desert Camouflage Uniform	United States	Battledress
Multi-Terrain Pattern	United Kingdom	Battledress
No. 7: Warm weather barrack dress	United Kingdom	Barrack dress
58 pattern webbing	United Kingdom	Webbing
Personal load carrying equipment	United Kingdom	Webbing used by C(SD)Company
Arktis webbing	United Kingdom	Webbing used by C(SD)Company
No. 2: Service dress (temperate parade uniform)	United Kingdom	Parade uniform
No. 3: Warm weather ceremonial uniform	United Kingdom	Parade uniform
Navy blue beret	United Kingdom	Beret
SPECTRA helmet	France	Helmet
Sistema Compositi SEPT-2 PLUS	Italy	Helmet
S10 NBC Respirator	United Kingdom	Gas mask

The AFM wears a single cap badge, based on that of the Royal Malta Artillery, which consists of a gun, similar to that worn by the Royal Artillery but without the crown, superimposed onto a Maltese Cross, with the motto "Tutela Bellicæ Virtutis" underneath.
