= Maltese Veterans =

- Active: 1803–1815
- Country: United Kingdom of Great Britain and Ireland: Malta Protectorate/Colony
- Branch: British Army
- Type: Veterans
- Role: Guards
- Size: Four companies

Commanders
- Commander: Pandolfo Testaferrata (1803–11); Pietro Paolo Testaferrata (1811–15)

The Maltese Veterans, also known as the Corps of Veterans, was a corps in the British Army which existed from 1803 to 1815 in Malta, then a British protectorate and later a colony.

According to the Treaty of Amiens of 1802, Britain was to evacuate Malta and restore the islands to the Order of St. John. The treaty also stated that at least half of Malta's garrison had to consist of 2000 Maltese soldiers led by native officers. Although the treaty was not implemented and the British did not evacuate Malta, the garrisons were readjusted, with the existing Maltese Light Infantry, Maltese Militia and Maltese Militia Coast Artillery being disbanded.

The Maltese Veterans were set up in accordance with the treaty in 1803. The unit consisted of four companies with a total of 300 men. Their roles included acting as guards for government offices, military facilities and public spaces. The veterans consisted of the oldest and most experienced Maltese recruits, most of them who had been soldiers during Hospitaller rule or the French occupation. The unit was meant to provide employment for old men, while also encouraging younger men to enlist in other units so that they would be able to join the Veterans when they are older. The unit was commanded by the Marquis Pandolfo Testaferrata until 1811, when he was succeeded by Baron Pietro Paolo Testaferrata. All the officers were Maltese, with the exception of English adjutants who were transferred from British regiments.

The Maltese Veterans assisted civil authorities in the efforts to contain the 1813 plague epidemic in Malta.

The Maltese Veterans were amalgamated with the Maltese Provincial Battalions and the Malta Coast Artillery to form the Royal Malta Fencible Regiment on 16 February 1815.
