= Military ranks of Malta =

The Military ranks of Malta are the military insignia used by the Armed Forces of Malta. Malta shares a rank structure similar to that of the United Kingdom, but has no sleeve insignia for its air wing. The Maltese armed forces inherited the rank system of the Royal Malta Artillery through its conversion to the 1st Regiment of the then Malta Land Force.

== Commissioned officer ranks ==
The rank insignia of commissioned officers.

Rank group	General / flag officers	Senior officers			Junior officers
Army of Malta
Army of Malta	Brigadier; Brigadier	Colonel; Kurunell	Lieutenant colonel Logutenent kurunell	Major; Maġġur	Captain; Kaptan	Lieutenant; Logutenent	Second lieutenant Sekond logutenent
Maritime Squadron of Malta
Maritime Squadron of Malta	Brigadier; Brigadier	Colonel; Kurunell	Lieutenant colonel Logutenent kurunell	Major; Maġġur	Captain; Kaptan	Lieutenant; Logutenent	Second lieutenant Sekond logutenent
Rank group	General / flag officers	Senior officers			Junior officers

== Other ranks ==
The rank insignia of non-commissioned officers and enlisted personnel.

Rank group	Senior NCOs				Junior NCOs		Enlisted
Army of Malta							No insignia
Army of Malta	Warrant Officer Class 1 Uffiċjal tal-warrant tal-klassi 1	Warrant Officer Class 2 Uffiċjal tal-warrant tal-klassi 2	Staff Sergeant; Surġent tal-istaff	Sergeant; Surġent	Bombardier; Bumbardier	Lance Bombardier; Bumbardier tal-lanċa	Gunner; Artiller
Maritime Squadron of Malta							No insignia
Maritime Squadron of Malta	Warrant Officer Class 1 Uffiċjal tal-warrant tal-klassi 1	Warrant Officer Class 2 Uffiċjal tal-warrant tal-klassi 2	Staff Sergeant; Surġent tal-istaff	Sergeant; Surġent	Bombardier; Bumbardier	Lance Bombardier; Bumbardier tal-lanċa	Gunner; Artiller
Rank group	Senior NCOs				Junior NCOs		Enlisted

Rank group	Senior NCO
Army of Malta
Army of Malta	Garrison sergeant major Surġent Maġġur tal-Gwarniġjun	Regimental sergeant major Surġent Maġġur Reġimentali
