= Malta Coast Artillery =

- Active: 1802–1815
- Country: United Kingdom of Great Britain and Ireland: Malta Protectorate/Colony
- Branch: British Army
- Role: Coastal artillery
- Size: Three companies
- Garrison/HQ: St. Paul's Bay and Marsa Scirocco

Commanders
- Captain: John Vivion

The Malta Coast Artillery was a coastal artillery unit in the British Army which existed from 1802 to 1815 in Malta, then a British protectorate and later a colony.

According to the Treaty of Amiens of 1802, Britain was to evacuate Malta and restore the islands to the Order of St. John. The treaty also stated that at least half of Malta's garrison had to consist of 2000 Maltese soldiers led by native officers. Although the treaty was not implemented and the British did not evacuate Malta, the garrisons were readjusted, with the existing Maltese Light Infantry, Maltese Militia and Maltese Militia Coast Artillery being disbanded.

The Malta Coast Artillery was set up in accordance with the treaty in 1802, taking over the role of the Maltese Militia Coast Artillery which had been set up in 1801. The unit manned the batteries located at St. Paul's Bay and Marsa Scirocco, while detachments manned the coastal towers. Their duties included anti-smuggling operations. In February 1803, the Malta Coast Artillery consisted of 170 men. By 1804, this had increased to three companies of 100 men each, raised to 150 men in 1806. The unit was commanded by Captain John Vivion of the Royal Artillery, who had set up the Maltese Militia Coast Artillery.

Men from the Malta Coast Artillery wore the same uniform as that of the Royal Artillery, consisting of dark blue coats with red facings.

The Malta Coast Artillery was amalgamated with the Maltese Provincial Battalions and the Maltese Veterans to form the Royal Malta Fencible Regiment on 16 February 1815.
