= Maltese Provincial Battalions =

- Active: 1802–1815
- Country: United Kingdom of Great Britain and Ireland: Malta Protectorate/Colony
- Branch: British Army
- Type: Infantry
- Size: Two battalions (1802–06); One battalion (1806–15)
- Garrison/HQ: Fort Manoel and Fort Ricasoli, later Cottonera

Commanders
- Commanders: Colonel Marquis Paolo Parisi; Conte Luigi Maria Gatto

The Maltese Provincial Battalions were infantry battalions in the British Army which existed from 1802 to 1815 in Malta, then a British protectorate and later a colony.

According to the Treaty of Amiens of 1802, Britain was to evacuate Malta and restore the islands to the Order of St. John. The treaty also stated that at least half of Malta's garrison had to consist of 2000 Maltese soldiers led by native officers. Although the treaty was not implemented and the British did not evacuate Malta, the garrisons were readjusted, with the existing Maltese Light Infantry, Maltese Militia and Maltese Militia Coast Artillery being disbanded.

The Maltese Provincial Battalions were set up by Civil Commissioner Sir Alexander Ball in 1802 to take over the role of the Maltese Militia. The original plan was to have two infantry battalions of 1000 men each, but eventually two battalions of 700 men each were set up. In addition, two other corps were also raised at the same time: the Malta Coast Artillery and the Maltese Veterans. The 1st Provincial Battalion was headquartered at Fort Manoel, while the 2nd Provincial Battalion was based at Fort Ricasoli. The Provincials' roles included serving as a police force and a coast guard. At times, the men also repaired roads, fences and fortifications.

According to the treaty, the battalions' officers were to be Maltese nobles appointed by the Grand Master. However, Ball himself chose two Maltese pro-British nobles, the Marquis Paolo Parisi and Conte Luigi Maria Gatto, as the commanding officers of the 1st and 2nd Battalions respectively. He did not grant them commissions so as not to violate the treaty. This move was criticized by the French, and eventually the Napoleonic Wars broke out in 1803 after multiple violations of various terms of the treaty by both the British and the French.

The number of recruits in the Provincials severely depleted in 1805, when many men resigned to volunteer in the newly established Royal Regiment of Malta. 23 men of the 2nd Provincials died in a gunpowder magazine explosion in Birgu on 18 July 1806. What remained of the two battalions were merged into a single battalion based at Fort Manoel and commanded by Parisi in October 1806. Since the men had agreed to a maximum of five years of service, there were plans to disband the Provincials. However, Ball was against this and the terms of service were renewed in 1807 and again in 1812. Parisi resigned his commission in 1811, and he was succeeded by the Conte Luigi Maria Gatto, former commander of the 2nd Battalion. By the following year, the unit was based at Cottonera.

During the plague epidemic of 1813–14, the Provincial Battalion assisted the civil authorities in trying to contain the outbreak. This led to a drastic decrease in the number of new recruits, who did not want to risk getting infected themselves. The battalion's reduction and disbandment was seen as inevitable by late 1813. By 1815, the unit consisted of four companies.

The Maltese Provincial Battalions were amalgamated with the Coast Artillery and the Veterans to form the Royal Malta Fencible Regiment on 16 February 1815.
