= Siege of Porto Ferrajo =

Part of the French Revolutionary Wars

- Part of the French Revolutionary Wars
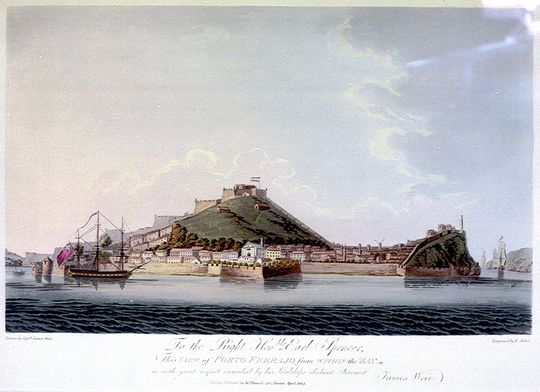
- An engraving of Porto Ferrajo in the early nineteenth century
Date	May – October 1801
Location	Porto Ferrajo, Elba, Tuscany 42°49′N 10°19′E
Result	Anglo-Tuscan victory

Belligerents
Tuscany; United Kingdom	France

Commanders and leaders
Carlo de Fisson; George Airey	Jean Victor Tharreau; François Watrin

The siege of Porto Ferrajo was a French attempt to force the surrender of the Tuscan fortress town of Porto Ferrajo (now Portoferraio) on the island of Elba following the French occupation of mainland Tuscany in 1801 during the French Revolutionary Wars. The Tuscan garrison was heavily outnumbered, but received significant support from British Royal Navy forces who controlled the Mediterranean Sea and ensured that supplies reached the garrison and that French supply convoys were intercepted. The French began the siege with 1,500 men in May 1801, later reinforced to more than 5,000, but could not make an impression on the fortress's defences, instead seeking to starve the defenders into submission with the support of a squadron of French Navy frigates operating off the coast.

The presence of a small British naval squadron in the region rendered this plan impractical and additional British reinforcements under Rear-Admiral Sir John Borlase Warren and Lieutenant Colonel George Airey strengthened the defenders to the point that sallies could be made against French offensive positions. The French subsequently lost all of the frigates sent to blockade the port to patrolling British warships in a series of one-sided engagements, giving the British local dominance that allowed them to maintain the fortress. Despite a number of naval actions and one significant land engagement, the siege dragged on inconclusively for the summer and early autumn of 1801, and when the first articles of the Treaty of Amiens were signed in October, the town was still under Tuscan control, although the provisions of the final agreement, signed in March 1802, granted the island to France.

== Background ==
In 1800, French First Consul Napoleon Bonaparte advanced into Italy, achieving victories against the Austrian Empire at the battle of Marengo. After a year of warfare, the French and Austrians signed the Treaty of Lunéville on 9 February 1801, which divided Northern Italy between the states and awarded the Grand Duchy of Tuscany to the French. Included in this division was the island of Elba in the Ligurian Sea off the Western Italian coast, which at that time was shared between Tuscany and the Kingdom of Naples. On 28 March 1801, the Treaty of Florence was signed between Naples and France, officially turning the entirety of Elba over to French control, although it had not yet been surrendered by its Neapolitan and Tuscan commanders.

Although the Ligurian Sea was by this stage largely French territorial waters, after the Royal Navy had destroyed the French Mediterranean Fleet at the Battle of the Nile off Egypt in 1798, the British in fact controlled it and the whole Mediterranean Sea. By 1801 British bases at Gibraltar, Menorca and Malta allowed British naval forces to cruise throughout the sea largely unopposed; their presence forced the remnants of the French fleet based at Toulon to make short journeys between French bases to avoid interception and capture. It was therefore not until a large French squadron under Rear-Admiral Honoré Ganteaume briefly asserted regional naval superiority that a French expeditionary force was able to secure Elba.

=== Invasion of Elba ===
They sailed from Piombino on 2 May 1801 with 1,500 men under General Jean Victor Tharreau, who landed unopposed at the Neapolitan town of Porto Longone.

The invasion force rapidly spread across the island, meeting no resistance as the entire Neapolitan portion and almost all of the Tuscan region surrendered before them. Soon, all that remained in Tuscan hands was the fortress port town of Porto Ferrajo on the northern coast. This was a powerful defensive position, and the Tuscan commander Carlo de Fisson rejected Tharreau's demands that he surrender. The presence of two British frigates, HMS Phoenix and HMS Mermaid, off the port, buttressed de Fisson's position.

== Siege ==
Tharreau responded by laying siege to the fortress. The sudden departure of Phoenix and Mermaid in the face of Ganteaume's squadron, which bombarded the town on 6 May before being forced to retire following the outbreak of typhus on board the squadron, encouraged Tharreau. The small French frigate Badine subsequently blockaded Porto Ferrajo, with the intention of starving the defenders into surrender. Three more frigates Carrère, Bravoure and Succès, under the overall command of Captain Jacques-François-Ignace Bretel, soon arrived to augment Badine's blockade.

=== Reinforcements ===
For the next three months the siege continued with little significant activity on either side, until the arrival at the end of July of General François Watrin with 5,000 additional men and instructions from General Joachim Murat to prosecute the siege more vigorously. However, the arrival off Porto Ferrajo on 1 August of a powerful British squadron under Rear-Admiral Sir John Borlase Warren in HMS Renown, whose ship chased Bravoure and Succès as far as Leghorn and reopened the sea passage into the port, almost immediately frustrated Watrin's ambitions. At the same time, a small British force under Captain Gordon landed at Porto Ferrajo to augment the Tuscan garrison.

Then at 14:30 on 3 August, three of Warren's patrolling frigates, Phoenix under Captain Lawrence Halsted, HMS Pomone under Captain Edward Leveson-Gower and HMS Pearl under Captain Samuel James Ballard, discovered a sail off the western shore of Elba and gave chase. The ship was the 38-gun Carrère under Captain Claude-Pascal Morel-Beaulieu, carrying 300 barrels of powder and escorting a convoy of small coastal vessels carrying military supplies from Porto Ercole to Porto Longone. Although Carrère turned away from the British pursuit and actively engaged the lead ship Pomone with her stern-chasers (cannon mounted in the rear of the frigate), Carrère was too laden to escape her opponents. After a ten-minute chase as Pearl cut off the route to Porto Longone and Pomone manoeuvered into a firing position, Captain Morel-Beaulieu surrendered. Losses on Pomone were limited to two killed and four wounded, two of whom subsequently died; Carrère had suffered "tolerably severe" casualties in the engagement from a complement of 352. The delay caused by the brief chase however had allowed the coastal ships to disperse and flee so that all of them avoided capture and some even reached Porto Longone.

Carrère was a modern ship seized from the Republic of Venice after the Treaty of Campo Formio in 1797. The Royal Navy took her into service under her existing name, although the Admiralty retired her from active service within a year.

Although Warren departed soon afterwards leaving just a frigate squadron behind, the siege continued throughout August. French forces dominated Elba but were unable to make an impression on the walls of the fortress while Royal Navy forces controlled access to the island by sea, providing supplies for the defenders and denying them to the French. Halsted and Phoenix maintained a blockade of the port of Piombino on the Italian mainland, ensuring the interception of French supplies.

At the end of August, Watrin learned that Phoenix was alone off the port and sent a message to Leghorn, where the remainder of the French squadron still lay at anchor, instructing them to attack the isolated British warship. Succès and Bravoure sailed on 31 August and arrived off Piombino at 06:30 on 2 September to discover that the frigates Pomone and HMS Minerve, under Captain George Cockburn, had joined Phoenix. Halsted had received an intelligence report detailing Watrin's demand that the French ships sail from Leghorn and had summoned reinforcements.

Minerve was the closest to the arriving French vessels and immediately gave chase, Cockburn signalling to Halsted and Leveson-Gower to join him. On sighting the British frigates Bretel turned back northwards towards Leghorn, but by 09:00 all three British warships were gaining on his small squadron. Unable to escape pursuit and with Minerve rapidly approaching, Bretel drove Succès ashore at Vada beach near Cecina in the hope of luring Minerve away from Bravoure, but Cockburn instead simply fired on the grounded vessel in passing before continuing towards the remaining ship while Bretel surrendered to Pomone. Captain Louis-Auguste Dordelin made desperate attempts to reach Leghorn before he was overtaken, but a northerly wind drove him back repeatedly and eventually he was forced to drive his frigate ashore under the Antignano battery, 4 nautical miles (7.4 km) south of Leghorn harbour. Waves battered Bravoure, causing all three masts to fall overboard and the ship to become a total wreck. The small British force under Lieutenant William Kelly that boarded Bravoure was only able to bring off a few prisoners before heavy fire from batteries ashore forced them to quit her. Kelly ignored his instructions to burn Bravoure in order to spare the lives of the many French sailors still trapped on the ship. To the south, the British dragged Succès off the beach. The French had captured her in February 1801, and after repairs she returned to service in the Royal Navy under her former name of HMS Success.

=== Counter attack ===
With the French threat by sea eliminated, the Royal Navy was free to go on the offensive, and command of the Porto Ferrajo garrison was placed in the hands of Lieutenant Colonel George Airey while Warren had returned with his powerful squadron. Plans were then drawn up for a force of seamen, Royal Marines and Tuscan auxiliaries to launch an amphibious operation against the French batteries that overlooked the mouth of the harbour. The British assembled a landing party of 449 Marines and 240 seamen from Renown, HMS Gibraltar, HMS Dragon, HMS Alexander, HMS Genereux, HMS Stately, Pomone, Pearl and the brig HMS Vincejo, all under the command of Captain George Long of Vincejo and Captain John Chambers White of Renown. Approximately 1,000 Tuscan troops joined them. Landings took place on the morning of 14 September. The troops then moved inland against the batteries in two columns while Dragon and Genereux bombarded a fortified tower at Marciana.

The attack began well as the British destroyed several batteries and took 55 prisoners of war, but soon the greater French numbers began to tell and the landing parties were pushed back to their beachheads in some confusion, having lost 32 killed, including Captain Long, 61 wounded and 105 missing, of which 15 dead, 33 wounded and 77 missing were British troops. General Watrin claimed this as a victory, inflating the numbers engaged and inaccurately claiming to have caused 1,200 casualties to the allies as well as having captured 200 men. Watrin also claimed to have dismasted a frigate and destroyed several smaller craft with fire from his batteries; none of the British warships reported any damage.

Although Warren departed the region soon afterwards with most of his squadron, Watrin was still unable to make an impression on the walls of Porto Ferrajo, and Airey held the town against the French for the last few weeks of the war until news arrived of the ceasefire that accompanied the provisional signing of the Treaty of Amiens on 1 October.

== Aftermath ==
On 11 October, volunteers from the Maltese Light Infantry arrived to relieve the garrison at Porto Ferrajo. In March 1802 under Article XI of the final terms of the Treaty, the British turned over the entire island to the French and Elba remained in French hands throughout the Napoleonic Wars. The Maltese detachment returned to Malta in April 1802.

== Bibliography ==
- Chandler, David (1999) [1993]. Dictionary of the Napoleonic Wars. Wordsworth Military Library. ISBN 1-84022-203-4.
- Clowes, William Laird (1997) [1900]. The Royal Navy, A History from the Earliest Times to 1900, Volume IV. London: Chatham Publishing. ISBN 1-86176-013-2.
- Gardiner, Robert, ed. (2001) [1996]. Nelson Against Napoleon. Caxton Editions. ISBN 1-86176-026-4.
- Musteen, Jason R. (2011). Nelson's Refuge: Gibraltar in the Age of Napoleon. Naval Investiture Press. ISBN 978-1-59114-545-5.
- James, William (2002) [1827]. The Naval History of Great Britain, Volume 3, 1800–1805. London: Conway Maritime Press. ISBN 0-85177-907-7.
- Woodman, Richard (2001). The Sea Warriors. Constable Publishers. ISBN 1-84119-183-3.
