= Maltese Cannoneers =

- Active: 1794–1802
- Country: Kingdom of Great Britain (1794–1800); United Kingdom of Great Britain and Ireland (1801–02)
- Branch: British Army
- Type: Artillery
- Role: Cannoneers
- Size: One company of 140 men
- Engagements: French Revolutionary Wars

The Maltese Cannoneers was an artillery company within the British Army which existed from 1794 to 1802. It was the first Maltese military unit in British service.

== History ==
The unit was raised covertly while Malta was still ruled by the Order of St. John. It was recruited by the Chevalier De Sade on the orders of the Viceroy of Corsica, Sir Gilbert Elliot. De Sade arrived in Malta in December 1794, with the aim of acquiring ordnance requirements and raise a company of artillerymen. De Sade and the company of 140 military artificers and engineers returned to Corsica in May 1795, taking with them 230 half-barrels of powder. Elliot was impressed with the men and stated that:

They prove a most valuable acquisition. The artificers are extremely good and they are all obedient, laborious men, likely to be good soldiers in any service they may be attached to.

The Maltese Cannoneers were amalgamated with a company of French Marine Refugee Artillery in 1796. They served in Portugal until June 1802, and the unit was disbanded the following August at East Cowes on the Isle of Wight. The men returned to Malta, which by then had become a British protectorate.
