= Air Wing of the Armed Forces of Malta =

Air warfare branch of Malta's military

Armed Forces of Malta Air Wing
- L-Iskwadra tal-Ajru tal-FAM
- Malta Air Wing emblem
- Active: 1973–present
- Country: Malta
- Type: Air force
- Role: Aerial warfare
- Size: 7 aircraft
- Part of: Armed Forces of Malta
- Decorations

Commanders
- Commanding Officer: Lt Col Nicholas Grech AFM

Insignia
- Roundel

- Fin flash

Aircraft flown
- Reconnaissance: Beechcraft Super King Air, Britten-Norman BN-2 Islander
- Transport: AgustaWestland AW139

The Air Wing of the Armed Forces of Malta (Maltese: L-Iskwadra tal-Ajru tal-FAM) is the aerial component of the current Maltese military, the Armed Forces of Malta (AFM). The Air Wing has responsibility for the security of Maltese airspace, conducts maritime patrol and Search and Rescue duties, medical evacuation, VIP transport and provides assistance to other government departments of Malta.

The Air Wing of the Armed Forces is based at the AFM terminal at the Malta International Airport.

== History ==
While Malta has a rather long tradition of military aviation within its territory, including the housing of Royal Air Force bases and squadrons during World War II, the nation had no official military aviation of its own until gaining independence in 1964 (and the building of an independent national military that followed).

The Air Wing was founded as an operational branch of the Armed Forces of Malta in the early 1970s. The Air Wing serves primarily as a support branch of the ground forces (for troop transport, security escort, and fire support) and the Maritime Squadron of the AFM (for maritime surveillance and border control missions), and has never operated combat aircraft to date. The Air Wing's current Commanding Officer is Lt. Col Nicholas Grech.

On 13 December 2013, the Air Wing of the AFM was awarded the 'Midalja għall-Qadi tar-Repubblika' (MQR) in recognition of its distinguished service toward safety at sea, humanitarian assistance to people in distress and to the welfare of Maltese people.

In a bilateral agreement with Italy, the Italian Air Force provided two AB 212 helicopters to perform SAR duties with Maltese rescuers on board. These were operated under the name of Italian Military Mission in Malta which was initially intended to help the Maltese Government establish and maintain a modern military force as well operate a SAR detachment. This lasted more than 40 years with the Italian AB212s and their predecessors, the AB 204 logging over 15,000 flight hours in both training and SAR missions whilst saving over 270 people. By 2015, the intended role of this mission had been fulfilled, with the Maltese Air Wing able to operate a modern SAR force. Due to Italian budget cuts (the Italian Military Mission in Malta was an Italian mission with Italian equipment, aircraft and financing), the mission started to wind down, and eventually, the final chapter of service was closed in 2016, with the Italian AB212s being retired.

== Structure ==
The main divisions of the Air Wing are:

- The Air Wing Headquarters – Tasked with command, control, and coordination of the air wing's divisions and sub-units, to ensure unit readiness for responding to various operational requirements, both locally and overseas.
- The Headquarters Squadron – Provides logistical and service support to the other sub-units of the AFM Air Wing. It is responsible for transport management, logistics procurement, and human resources administration required for the air wing's daily duties and commitments. The Integrated Logistics Division within the Headquarters Squadron is tasked with ensuring the stocking up of all aircraft parts and aircraft maintenance documentation.
- The Operations Squadron – The main operations element of the AFM's Air Wing, in charge of utilising the aircraft inventory. It consists of three subdivisions:
  - The Fixed Wing Flight – In charge of coastal and offshore patrolling, sighting and reporting of irregular migration at sea and interdiction, fisheries patrols, and several other varied flight duties.
  - The Rotary Wing Flight – Handles all helicopter operations, ranging from offshore casualty evacuation and rescue to air ambulance, as well as patient transfer between the Islands' two main hospitals. It also assists other government entities as required.
  - The Rescue Section – A small unit of soldiers and rescue personnel specially trained for rescue operations on land and at sea. Each rescue swimmer is qualified in first aid, life saving, and other specialist skills. Membership in the unit requires a high level of physical fitness.
- The Support Squadron – By far the largest of the Air Wing's divisions, the Support Squadron is in charge of the maintenance of the aircraft inventory. The ground crew personnel are also responsible for aircraft and equipment handling on the ground, emergency firefighting, aircraft marshalling, aircraft towing, aircraft refuelling, and other essential line duties.

== Aircraft ==
Below is a list of aircraft operated by the Armed Forces of Malta Air Wing. The Air Wing operates 4 fixed-wing aircraft and 3 helicopters. Since its founding, the Air Wing has never operated jet-powered or combat aircraft.

The Armed Forces of Malta (AFM) has expanded its Air Wing in response to a significant rise in operational demands, with activity increasing by 40% over the past six years. To address this, the AFM has invested €50 million in acquiring a new Beechcraft King Air aircraft and an AgustaWestland AW139 helicopter, both expected to arrive next year.

Chief Commander Clinton O’Neill explained that this expansion supports a broader range of responsibilities, including search and rescue missions, medical evacuations, border control, surveillance, and intelligence gathering for national security. The AFM is also focusing on standardisation and strengthening its existing capabilities to improve overall efficiency and effectiveness.

=== Current inventory ===
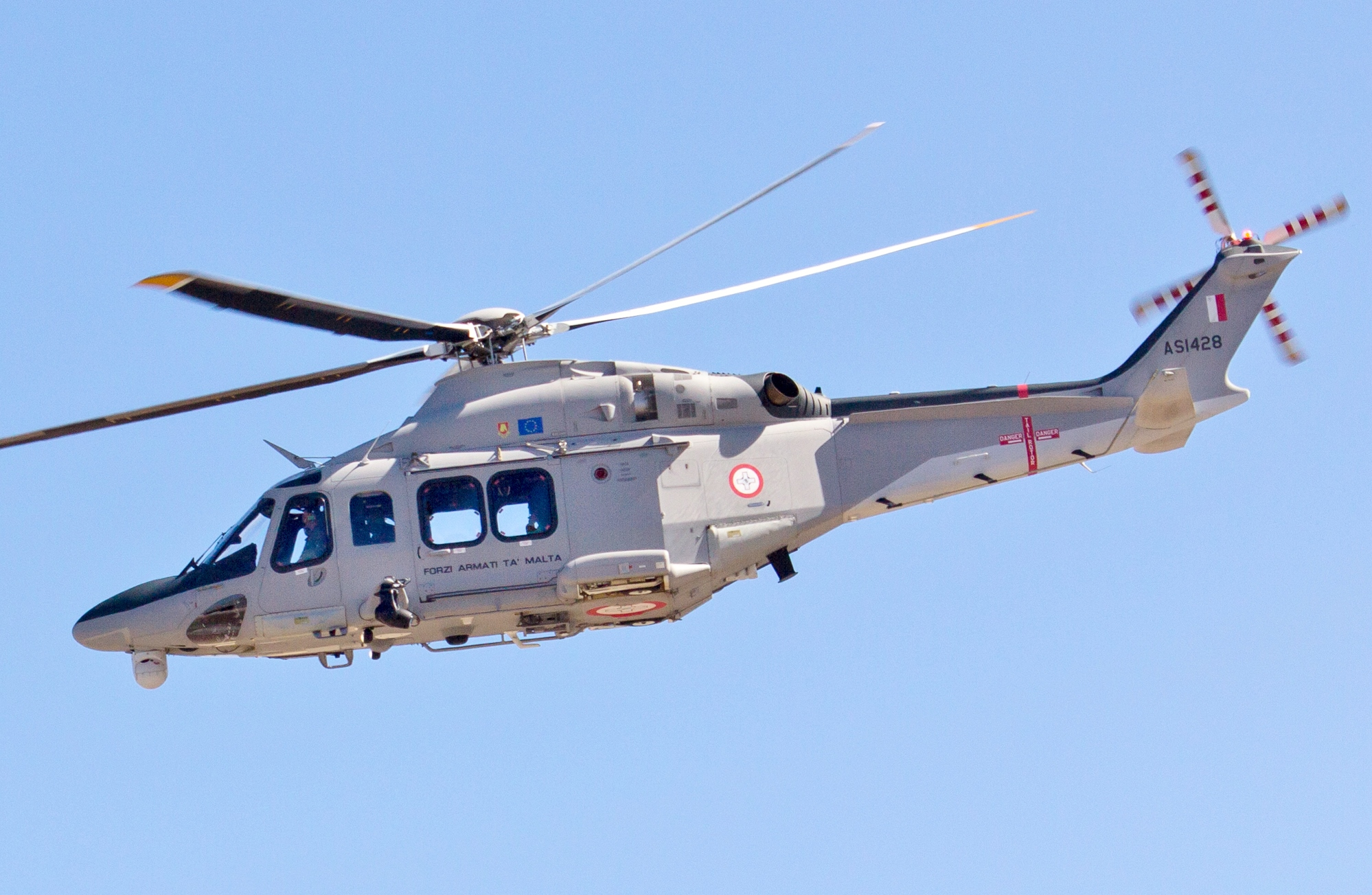
An AFM AW139 over Malta International Airport.

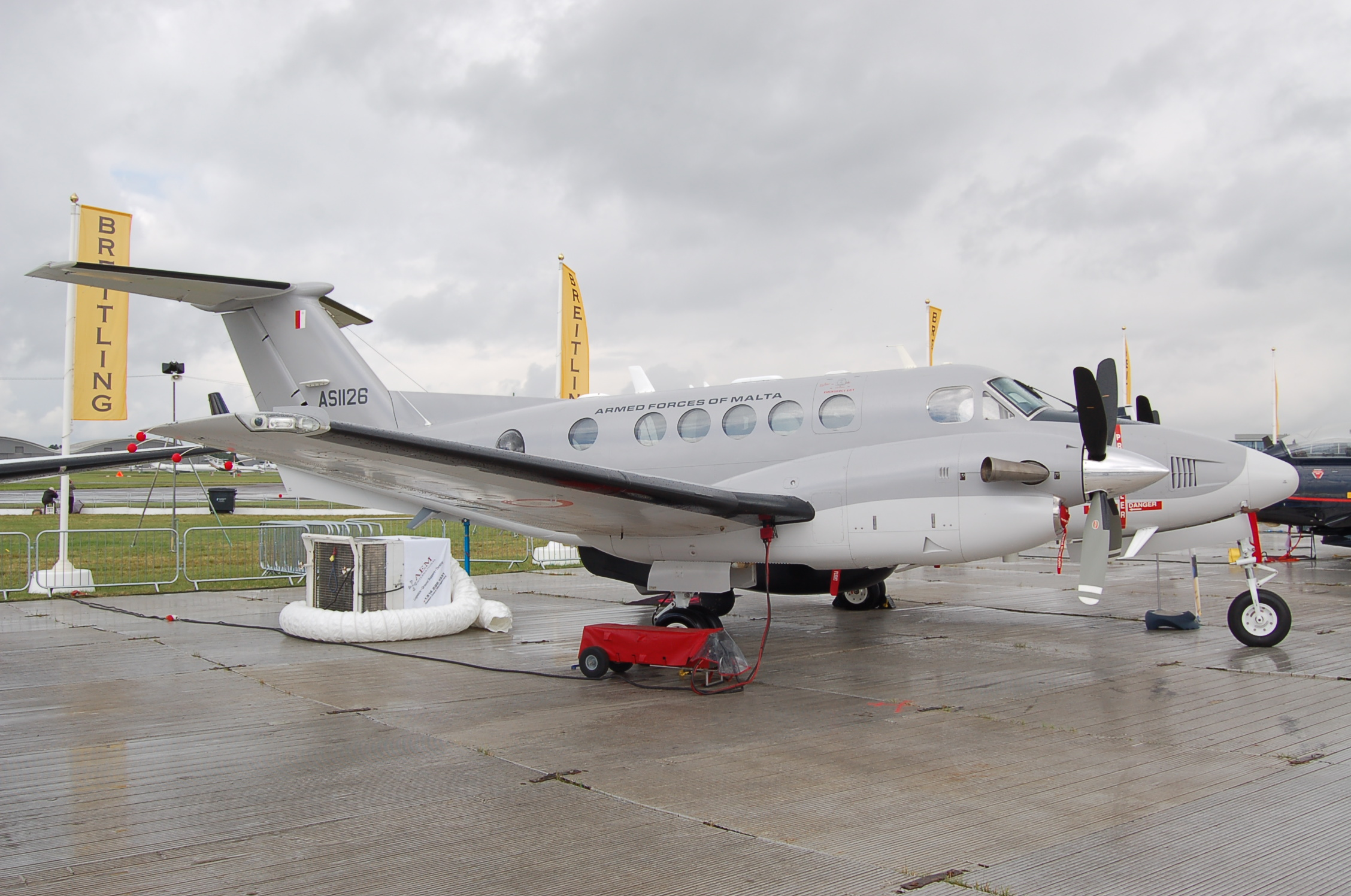
A Maltese King Air 200 on display at the Farnborough Air Show.

Aircraft	Origin	Type	Variant	In service	Notes
Maritime patrol
BN-2 Islander	United Kingdom	Maritime patrol	BN-2B/T	1	
Super King Air	United States	Maritime patrol	B200	3 (+1 on order)	Three in service. A fourth on order (order announced 17 December 2025). Fitted with a maritime surveillance radar.
Helicopters
AgustaWestland AW139	Italy	Maritime patrol / SAR		3 (+1 on order)	A fourth on order (order announced 22 December 2025).
UAVs
IAI Heron	Israel	Surveillance		1	

=== Retired ===
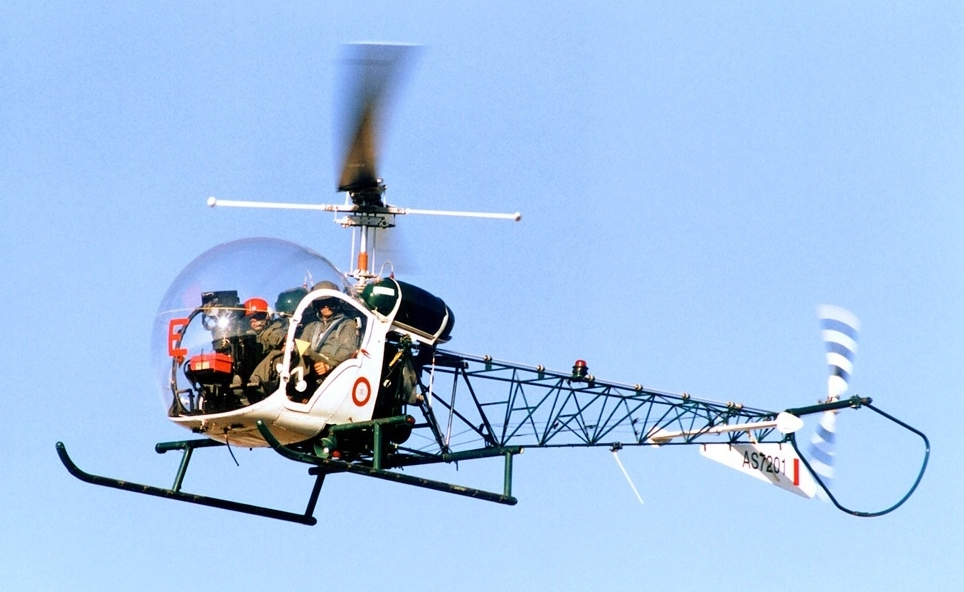
An Agusta-Bell 47G-2 over Malta International Airport.

Aircraft	Origin	Type	Variant	In service	Notes
Maritime patrol
BAe Bulldog	United Kingdom	Patrol / Trainer	Model 121	5	Removed from service
CASA C-212	Spain	Maritime patrol / SAR		1	3-month lease from CAE Aviation of Luxembourg
Surveillance
Cessna O-1	United States	Liaison / Observation	O-1E	5	Retired from service
Helicopters
Agusta-Bell 47	Italy	Maritime patrol	47G2/G	3/1	Three G2s were former West German Army aircraft
Agusta-Bell 206	Italy	SAR / Utility	Agusta-206A	1	
MD 500	Italy	SAR / Utility	NH-500M	2	Licensed built Hughes 500 by Breda Nardi
Alouette III	France	SAR / Utility	SA316B	5	Three ex-Libyan and two ex-Netherlands.
