= Maltese Militia Coast Artillery =

- Active: 1801–1802
- Country: United Kingdom of Great Britain and Ireland: Malta Protectorate
- Branch: British Army
- Type: Militia
- Role: Coastal artillery
- Size: Two companies
- Garrison/HQ: St. Paul's Bay and Marsa Scirocco

Commanders
- Captain: John Vivion

The Maltese Militia Coast Artillery was a coastal artillery militia unit in the British Army which existed from 1801 to 1802 in Malta, then a British protectorate.

After the French blockade ended and the British took over Malta in September 1800, many of the British regiments stationed on the island left to fight in the Egyptian Campaign. This led to a shortage of troops on the islands, and since the High Command was unable to send reinforcements. The Commander-in-Chief of British forces in Malta, General Henry Pigot, was allowed to raise a local militia force to supplement the Maltese Light Infantry.

On 1 January 1801, Pigot issued a proclamation calling on men from the former National Congress Battalions to join the Maltese Militia. At the same time, the Maltese Militia Coast Artillery was set up as the coastal artillery portion of the militia, augmenting the Royal Artillery. It consisted of two companies manning the batteries located at St. Paul's Bay and Marsa Scirocco, along with detachments manning the coastal towers. The unit was raised and commanded by Captain John Vivion.

The men wore uniforms consisting of a cotton jacket and trousers, and a leather shako with a blue sash.

In 1802, the Maltese Militia Coast Artillery was disbanded in accordance with the Treaty of Amiens, and its roles were taken over by the Malta Coast Artillery.
