= 1st Regiment (Malta) =

- L-Ewwel Reġiment
- Active: 1974 – present
- Country: Malta
- Branch: Armed Forces of Malta
- Type: Regiment
- Role: HQ Company - Combat Service Support; A Company – Airport Security; B Company – Public Duties; C (SD) Company -Special Forces; D Company - Artillery
- Garrison/HQ: Lyster Barracks, Ħal Far

Commanders
- Current commander: Lieutenant Colonel Chris Vella
- Notable commanders: Lieutenant Colonel Eric Parnis

The 1st Regiment (Maltese: L-Ewwel Reġiment tal-Forzi Armati ta' Malta) is a light infantry battalion of the Armed Forces of Malta. The Regimental Headquarters is at Lyster Barracks in Ħal Far. Lyster Barracks was a former Royal Navy and Royal Air Force barracks and originally named after Vice Admiral Sir Arthur Lumley St George Lyster. Admiral Lyster commanded the Fleet Air Arm force that protected the Operation Pedestal convoy force to Malta during World War 2. The current barracks site includes some of the original British military architecture and four of the accommodation blocks are named after famous Royal Navy aircraft carriers, some of whom were frequent visitors to Malta; i.e. Glorious, Courageous, Eagle and Hermes.

The 1st Regiment is task organised into a Headquarters Company, three Infantry Companies and an Air Defence and Support Company. It is the AFM's main land manoeuvre unit. Its tasks are based on public duties, security, crisis management operations and peacekeeping missions.

== History ==
The 1st Regiment's predecessor The Royal Malta Artillery was set up on 15 March 1889, with the specific aim of manning the guns around the Grand Harbour, which apart from being the point of connection with the rest of the world, was also important as a base for the Royal Navy. In time, more roles were created to cater for the great advances in warfare, especially during World War I, so that by the beginning of World War II the R.M.A consisted of 4 Regiments. There was also the Dockyard Defence Battery, composed of workers at the Admiralty Dockyard who alternated between manning their guns and working at their trade.

In 1970 the 1 Regiment of the Royal Malta Artillery was renamed as 1 Regiment, AFM. Initially, this continued their artillery role, with 2 Regiment formed as an engineers unit. In 1980, 1 Regiment became a mixed unit which included infantry, light army aviation and maritime responsibilities The light anti-aircraft artillery element was transferred to the 2 Regiment. In 1992, there was a major re-organisation, which led to the formation of 3 Regiment, which remains predominantly reflected in its structure till today.

== Organization ==
The battalion has the following organizational structure:

- HQ Company
- A Company
- B Company
- C Company
- D Company

=== HQ Company ===
The Headquarters Company provides combat service support to the other manoeuvre subunits of the unit. The orbat consists of a Company Headquarters, Motor Transport section, Pioneer section, Regimental Police section, Signals section, Armoury section and Quartermaster Section.

=== A Company ===
A Company is responsible for airport security in the controlled access role by providing security guards at terminal access points/airfield perimeter gates leading to restricted areas and by conducting patrol in these said areas. They also enforce access passes and visitor movement control assisted with CCTV surveillance and is based at Malta International Airport.

=== B Company ===
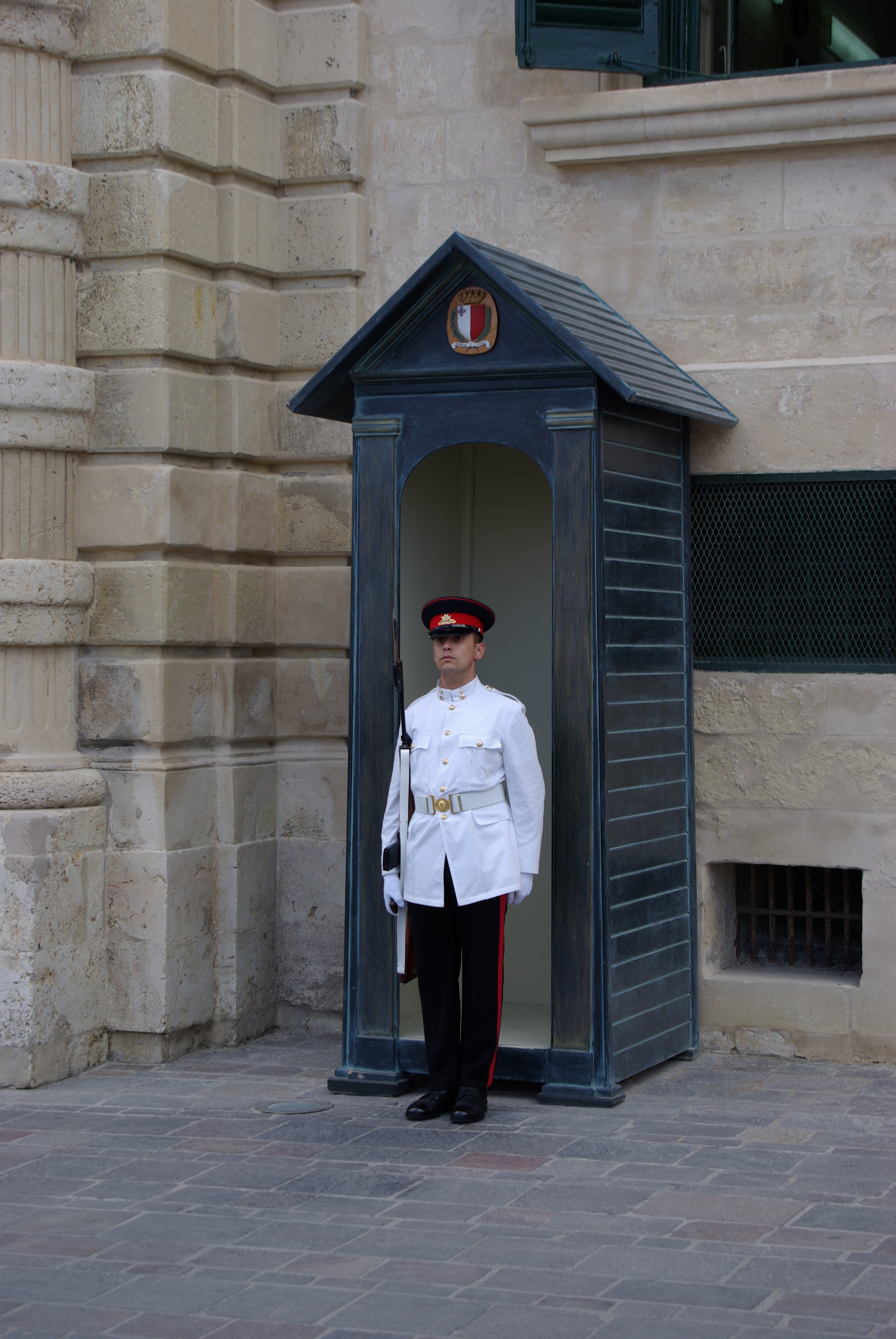
A soldier from B Company standing guard at the Grandmaster's Palace.

B Company is responsible for security duties in various locations. It carries out land patrols and conducts vehicle checkpoints for traffic contraventions, illegal immigrants' identification and apprehension, and anti-narcotics' searches. It consists of a Company Headquarters and five infantry platoons. B Company personnel are often engaged in ceremonial and security tasks when foreign dignitaries visit. In addition, it is an internal security company, tasked with guarding high-profile/sensitive government establishments. It is based at Ħal Far.

=== C Company ===
C (Special Duties) Company is the AFM's Quick Reaction Force, for high-risk operations both internally and as part of the European Union. It consists of a Company Headquarters and three infantry platoons, also maintaining sustainable sniper and close protection teams. It also serves as an infantry training unit for the AFM and is based at Hal-Far.

=== D Company ===
D (Air Defence & Support) Company provides Malta's primary air defence capability, armed with the Bofors 40mm L70 and ZPU-4 14.5mm AAMG as well as 81mm mortars, Type 69 RPGs and Browning .50 HMGs for ground support. Its primary role is the light anti-aircraft defence of Luqa Airport and other vulnerable points on the Maltese islands. Gunnery training and battery shooting practices are regularly held at Pembroke Ranges, St. Andrews. This sub-unit runs a training school conducting Junior Non-commissioned Officers Leadership development courses, Infantry trade courses, Ceremonial Saluting guns courses and AAMG courses. All the AFM ceremonial activities that involve the firing of the saluting guns are performed by this sub-unit. This sub-unit is also responsible for the administration and training of the Emergency Volunteer Reserve Force.

== Alternate HQ AFM Operations Centre ==
Lyster Barracks has also acted as an alternate Operations Centre for HQ AFM when the main Operations Centre at Luqa was out of action.

== Migrant Detention Facility ==
Hermes Black within Lyster Barracks, is a temporary secure detention facility for migrants awaiting administrative processing. The Hermes Block Detention Centre is managed by the government's Detention Service (DS) and not the AFM. The DFS is controlled by Malta's Ministry for Home Affairs, National Security and Law Enforcement.
