= Maltese Militia =

- Active: 1801–1802; 1852–1857
- Country: Great Britain; United Kingdom
- Branch: British Army
- Type: Militia
- Size: Three divisions (1801–02); Six or seven companies (1852–57)

The Maltese Militia or Malta Militia was a militia unit in the British Army which existed from 1801 to 1802, and again from 1852 to 1857. The first incarnation was a volunteer unit of 900 men raised in the British protectorate of Malta. The second establishment of the militia was as a compulsory service for the entire Maltese male population while the island was a British crown colony.

== 1801–1802 ==
After the French blockade ended and the British took over Malta in September 1800, many of the British regiments stationed on the island left to fight in the Egyptian Campaign. This led to a shortage of troops on the islands, and since the High Command was unable to send reinforcements. The Commander-in-Chief of British forces in Malta, General Henry Pigot, was allowed to raise a local militia force to supplement the Maltese Light Infantry.

Pigot wanted to build up the former National Congress Battalions, an irregular military which had been partially trained by the British, into a militia based on that already in existence in Britain. He issued a proclamation on 1 January 1801 calling on the men who had fought in the insurgent battalions to join the new militia of 900 men. The proclamation was read out in the villages nine days after it was issued, and the militia was at full strength soon afterwards. Maltese nobles were given officers' ranks in the militia. The militia consisted of three divisions split into three companies each:

- First Division (Central)
  - Valletta Company
  - Burmola Company
  - Senglea Company
- Second Division (East)
  - Zeitun and Gudia Company
  - Zabbar and Tarxien Company
  - Zurrico and Siggieui Company
- Third Division (West)
  - Notabile and Naxaro Company
  - Birchircara Company
  - Zebbug and Casal Lia Company

The First Division was commanded by Count de Gatto, the Second Division by Simeone Spiteri Gana and the Third Division by Marquis Parisi.

Simultaneously, two companies of coastal artillerymen were set up to form the Maltese Militia Coast Artillery.

The men were armed with muskets and bayonets, and their uniforms consisted of a cotton jacket and trousers, and a leather shako with a red sash. The arms, ammunition and uniforms were kept at each company's headquarters.

Militiamen were given several privileges, including being exempt from the taxes on carts and straw. This was done to improve support for the new British administration among the local population, so as to prevent a rebellion.

The militia was disbanded in 1802 in accordance with the Treaty of Amiens, and its role was taken over by the Maltese Provincial Battalions. The establishment of a country militia was approved in 1806 but it did not materialize.

== 1852–1857 ==
On 5 May 1852, Governor Sir William Reid reestablished the Maltese Militia. All Maltese men aged from 16 to 60 formed part of the Militia, and were obliged to attend at least 18 drills a year in their own districts, up to a total of 90 drills after which 3 drills a year were enough. Target practice took place on weekdays, while infantry and gun drills took place on Sundays. The men did not receive any pay or allowances for being part of the militia, and its establishment was met with strong opposition and resentment among the Maltese.

The militia was organized into six companies: two companies of 200 men each at Valletta for the defence of the Grand Harbour and Marsamuscetto Harbour, and a company of 100 men each for Floriana, Vittoriosa, Senglea and Cospicua. A company at Rabat, Gozo was later also established, while planned companies in the villages never materialized. Officers, including a captain commandant, surgeons, captains and subalterns were appointed directly by the Governor. Men from the Royal Malta Fencible Regiment instructed the militiamen.

The compulsory nature of the militia was abandoned in October 1854, and the unit was disbanded in 1857 since attendance at the drills was not satisfactory.

== See also ==
The King's Own Malta Regiment
