= Royal Malta Fencible Regiment =

- Active: 1815–1861
- Country: United Kingdom of Great Britain and Ireland: Crown Colony of Malta
- Branch: British Army
- Type: Mainly Infantry
- Role: Local infantry and coastal artillery defence
- Size: Up to ten companies deployed throughout the island

Commanders
- Colonel of the Regiment: The Most Noble Francesco, Count Rivarola, KCMG, KCH

The Royal Malta Fencible Regiment was an infantry battalion of the British Army which existed from 1815 to 1861 in Malta, then a British colony. The regiment was recruited and organised by Francesco Rivarola in 1815; Rivarola had proved himself loyal to the British Crown in fighting France. In 1861 the regiment was disbanded as an infantry unit and designated as a coastal artillery defence regiment, becoming the Royal Malta Fencible Artillery.

== Uniform ==
The regiment was clothed in the same uniform as the rest of the British army and all ranks dress uniform was a close-fitting scarlet tunic with tails, blue facings and gold lace for officers, dark blue/grey trousers or white overalls and headgear being the standard black infantry shako of various patterns issued to the British Army during the time of the unit's establishment. The shako badge was modelled on the British infantry standard eight-pointed facetted star with a Maltese crest at the centre and an immediate surrounding regimental title. In 1989 a set of Maltese commemorative stamps (the 4 Cent stamp) included an illustration of an officer of the regiment in dress uniform of 1839.

== Unit role ==
British Army units designated Fencibles were normally local forces raised for defence of an immediate locality and were commonplace in the United Kingdom. Many of Malta's noble families would provide the regiment with its officers

== Unit organisation and deployment ==
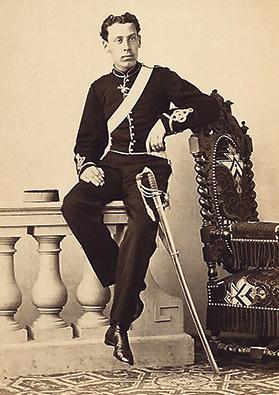
Leandro Preziosi, Portrait photo of Walter Sciortino, Royal Malta Fencible Artillery, ca. 1860

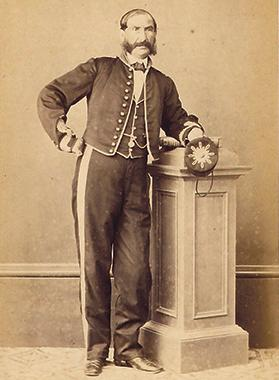
Leandro Preziosi, Officer in the Royal Malta Fencible Artillery

The regiment initially consisted of ten companies of Maltese soldiers and these were spread over the main island of Malta, with seven based in garrison areas within the greater Valletta area. Three of the companies were trained as coastal artillery, and were located in fixed defensive points in and around St Julian’s, Marsaxlokk and St Paul's Bay.

In 1817 the unit would be reduced to six companies, each under the command of a captain. The regiment augmented the island's police force and provided young officers to act as adjutants to local police force commanders. However by 1821 the unit was tasked with general military duties, giving up its police tasks.

In 1835 an article in the United Services Magazine put the total strength of the unit at 468; in 1836 Statistics of the Colonies of the British Empire gave far more detail on the Royal Malta Fencible Regiment's establishment as:

- One colonel commanding
- One major
- One lieutenant Adjutant
- Six captains
- Six lieutenants
- Six ensigns
- One paymaster
- One quartermaster
- One surgeon
- One assistant surgeon
- One sergeant-major
- Six colour sergeants
- One drum-major
- One sergeant paymaster's clerk
- One sergeant school master
- Four staff sergeants
- Fourteen sergeants
- Twenty four corporals
- 11 drummers
- 444 privates.

On 21 November 1838 Lieutenant General Sir Henry F Bouverie (Governor of Malta and commanding the Malta Garrison), presented the regiment with a set of colours on the Floriana Parade Ground. The regiment parading was commanded by Lieutenant Colonel the Marquess de Piro.

Between 1829 and 1839 the unit's officer manning levels remained fairly stable at:

- A regimental colonel - in 1829 and 1839 it was the Count Francesco Rivarola (who had seen active service with the Royal Sicilian Regiment)
- A regimental major/lieutenant colonel - in 1829 and 1839 it was the Marquis Giuseppe de Piro
- Six captains
- Seven to eight lieutenants (including an adjutant)
- Six to seven ensigns
- A paymaster
- A quarter-master
- A surgeon and an assistant surgeon

In 1856 Imperial account returns record that the "Royal Malta Fencibles" cost the Crown just under £12,197, less £1,099 in pay stoppages.

On 3 January 1862 the New York Times reported on a lecture given by Captain Petrie at United Service Institution in London that confirmed that the regiment still consisted of six line companies, plus staff. By the time the report was filed the regiment had ceased to exist as infantry and had become a static garrison artillery force - the Royal Malta Fencible Artillery.

== See also ==
- Maltese Militia
- Maltese Provincial Battalions
- Royal Malta Artillery
- Armed Forces of Malta
- Xlendi Tower
- History of Malta
- French invasion of Malta
