= Maltese Light Infantry =

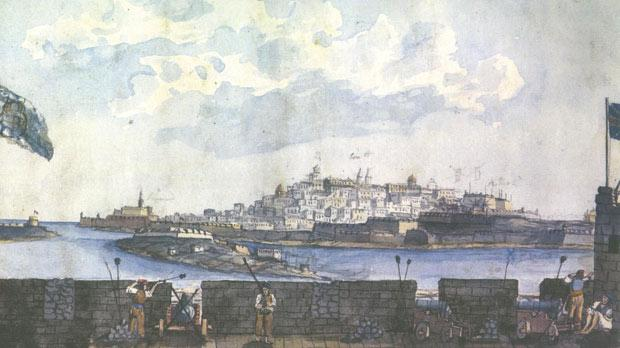
- A view of Valletta, taken from the Għargħar Battery (overlooking Manoel Island), during the Siege of 1800. Watercolour by Major James Weir
- Active: 1800–1802
- Country: Great Britain; United Kingdom
- Branch: British Army
- Type: Infantry
- Role: Light infantry
- Size: Eight companies
- Engagements: French Revolutionary Wars: Siege of Malta (1798–1800); Siege of Porto Ferrajo

Commanders
- Captain: James Weir
- Brigadier-General: Moncrieff

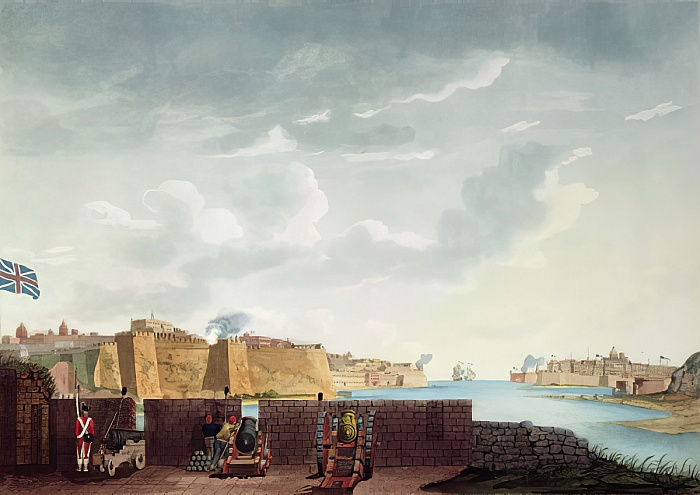
View of La Valletta, taken from the Marsa Battery during the Siege in 1800, engraved by Francis Chesham 1803, after Captain James Weir

The Maltese Light Infantry was a light infantry battalion of the British Army which existed from 1800 to 1802 in Malta, then a British protectorate. It consisted of eight companies of Maltese soldiers, and it saw action in the French Revolutionary Wars. It was the second Maltese unit in British service, after the Maltese Cannoneers.

British troops first arrived in Malta in 1798 in order to aid the Maltese in their rebellion against the French. On 10 December 1799, the 30th and 89th Regiments of Foot arrived from Sicily in order to enforce the blockade of Valletta, which was being held by the French. By February 1800, the commander of the British forces in Malta Brigadier-General Thomas Graham informed his superiors that he was intending to raise a Maltese force to fight in the blockade.

The first two companies of the Maltese Light Infantry were set up on 2 April 1800, and by May the unit had eight companies of 100 men each. It was temporarily commanded by Captain James Weir of the Royal Marines, before being transferred to Brigadier-General Moncrieff on 9 June 1800. Sergeants from the 30th and 89th Regiments became subaltern officers in the Maltese Light Infantry. Soldiers in the battalion were paid 8d a day, and their uniforms consisted of blue-grey coats which had red facings and gold lace, along with nankeen trousers.

The battalion fought in the blockade alongside both Maltese irregular forces and British regular troops, until the French surrendered in September 1800. By the beginning of 1801, the battalion had 747 men garrisoned at Fort Manoel and Fort Ricasoli, with a detachment at Fort St. Angelo. Although the battalion was intended for local service, 300 volunteers were sent to Elba on 22 September 1801 on board HMS Athenienne. They arrived on 11 October, relieving the besieged British garrison during the Siege of Porto Ferrajo.

The detachment in Elba returned to Malta in April 1802, and the battalion was disbanded upon the expiration of the two-year period for which its men had enlisted. Many of the soldiers re-enlisted in the newly formed Maltese Provincial Battalions.

The regimental colours of the Maltese Light Infantry were presented to Major Weir. In 1884, his son returned them to Malta and Governor Arthur Borton presented them to the Royal Malta Fencible Artillery. They were then deposited in the Palace Armoury in Valletta.
