= List of disasters in Malta by death toll =

This list of Maltese disasters by death toll includes disasters that occurred either in Malta or incidents outside of the country in which a number of Maltese citizens were killed. It does not include death tolls from war.

== List ==
Deaths	Date	Incident	Type	Location	Notes
11300	24 December 1675 – 15 July 1676	1675–1676 Malta plague epidemic	Epidemic	Malta	The plague outbreak was the worst epidemic in Maltese history.
4487–4668	28 March 1813 – 8 September 1814	1813–1814 Malta plague epidemic	Epidemic	Malta and Gozo	The plague outbreak, imported from Alexandria in Egypt, killed about 5% of Malta's population.
3000	7 May 1592 – 1593	1592–1593 Malta plague epidemic	Epidemic	Malta and Gozo	The plague outbreak was imported from Tuscan galleys.
600+	23 September 1551 (or 1556)	Grand Harbour of Malta tornado	Tornado	Grand Harbour	The tornado destroyed a number of ships in the harbour with great loss of life.
500+	11 September 2014	2014 Malta migrant shipwreck	Shipwreck	Mediterranean	A boat carrying hundreds of migrants capsized and sank, possibly deliberately, killing the vast majority of the people on board.
871	7 March 2020 – ongoing	COVID-19 pandemic	Pandemic	Malta and Gozo	As of 14 April 2026 .
150–240	18 July 1806	1806 Birgu polverista explosion	Explosion	Birgu	A gunpowder magazine located dangerously close to residential areas accidentally blew up, killing many soldiers and civilians and causing extensive property damage.
118+	25 November 1908	SS Sardinia	Ship fire	off Fort Ricasoli	The ship caught fire soon after leaving the Grand Harbour, resulting in a number of explosions and causing it to run aground. This is Malta's worst peacetime maritime disaster.
110	11 February 1823	Carnival tragedy of 1823	Human crush	Valletta	A human crush occurred among boys who were being given bread at a convent during carnival, killing around 110 people.
60	23–24 November 1985	EgyptAir Flight 648	Aircraft hijacking	Luqa	An EgyptAir aircraft en route from Egypt to Greece was hijacked by terrorists and landed in Malta. Egyptian commandos stormed the aircraft, resulting in 60 people being killed.
53	21 May 2007	2007 Malta migrant shipwreck	Shipwreck	Mediterranean	An overloaded boat carrying migrants went missing off Malta and no survivors were found.
50	18 February 1956	1956 Scottish Airlines Malta air disaster	Air crash	Żurrieq	The aircraft crashed shortly after takeoff from Luqa Airport, killing all fifty people on board.
40–45	1623	1623 Malta plague outbreak	Disease outbreak	Malta	The plague outbreak was contained without a very high death toll.
23	30 October 1948	1948 Gozo luzzu disaster	Shipwreck	off Qala	The overloaded boat capsized and sank, killing 23 of the 27 people on board.
22	12 September 1634	1634 Valletta explosion	Explosion	Valletta	A gunpowder factory exploded, causing 22 deaths and significant property damage.
22	June 1945 – June 1946	1945–1946 Malta plague outbreak	Disease outbreak	Malta	The plague outbreak was confined to the harbour area.
20	1655	1655 Malta plague outbreak	Disease outbreak	Malta	The plague outbreak was contained without a very high death toll.
20	4 April 1946	1946 Rabat Vickers Wellington crash	Air crash	Rabat	The bomber crashed into a street in Rabat, killing 4 crew members and 16 civilians on the ground.
12	April 1936 – May 1937	1936–1937 Malta plague outbreak	Disease outbreak	Malta	The plague outbreak was confined to Qormi, Żebbuġ, Rabat, Marsa and Attard.
9	3 February 1995	Um El Faroud	Explosion	Malta Dockyard	The tanker exploded while in dry dock, killing nine dockyard workers.
7	7 September 1984	C23 tragedy	Explosion	off Qala	A patrol boat dumping illegal fireworks at sea exploded, killing five soldiers and two policemen on board.
6	14 October 1975	1975 Żabbar Avro Vulcan crash	Air crash	Żabbar	The bomber crashed in Żabbar after an aborted landing at RAF Luqa, killing five crew members and a civilian on the ground.
6	3 December 1995	1995 Mediterranean Sea Piper Lance crash	Air crash	Mediterranean	The aircraft was en route from Tunisia to Malta when it went missing over the Mediterranean Sea. All 6 people on board, including 3 Maltese citizens, are presumed dead.
5	1 October 2005	Rabat–Żebbuġ road vehicle collision	Road accident	Rabat/Żebbuġ	Five teenagers were killed in a vehicle collision which is Malta's worst traffic accident.
5	24 October 2016	2016 Malta Fairchild Merlin crash	Air crash	Kirkop	The aircraft crashed shortly after takeoff from Malta International Airport, killing all five people on board.
4	29 March 1903	Fort Delimara explosion	Explosion	Marsaxlokk	Defective bombs stored at the fort detonated after children tampered with a bomb in an attempt to open it, killing four.
4	2 March – 2 April 1917	1917 Malta plague outbreak	Disease outbreak	Kalkara	The plague outbreak was confined to a group of dockyard workers.
4	30 December 1952	1952 Luqa Avro Lancaster crash	Air crash	Luqa	The bomber crashed in Luqa, killing 3 crew members and 1 civilian on the ground.
4	11 July 2008	Simshar incident	Shipwreck	Mediterranean	A fishing vessel exploded, leaving the five people on board stranded on a makeshift raft. Four of them subsequently died, with the only survivor being rescued a week after the explosion.
2	29 July 1955	MV Star of Malta	Shipwreck	off St. Julian's	The passenger ferry ran aground and capsized, killing one crew member and one passenger.
2	June 1982	1982 Tal-Virtù air crash	Air crash	Rabat	A light aircraft crashed into the seminary at Tal-Virtù, killing both people on board.

== See also ==
- List of accidents and disasters by death toll (worldwide)
