= 1655 Malta plague outbreak =

Disease outbreak in Malta

- Disease: Plague
- Pathogen: Yersinia pestis
- Location: Malta
- Date: 1655
- Deaths: 20

The 1655 Malta plague outbreak was a minor outbreak of plague (Maltese: pesta) on the island of Malta, then ruled by the Order of St John. The outbreak appeared in Kalkara and some cases were reported in Żabbar and the urban area around the Grand Harbour. Restrictive measures were imposed and the outbreak was contained after causing 20 deaths.

== Background ==
At the time of the outbreak, Malta was ruled by the Order of St John. In 1592–1593 a plague epidemic had killed about 3,000 people on the island and there was a small outbreak in 1623.

== Outbreak ==
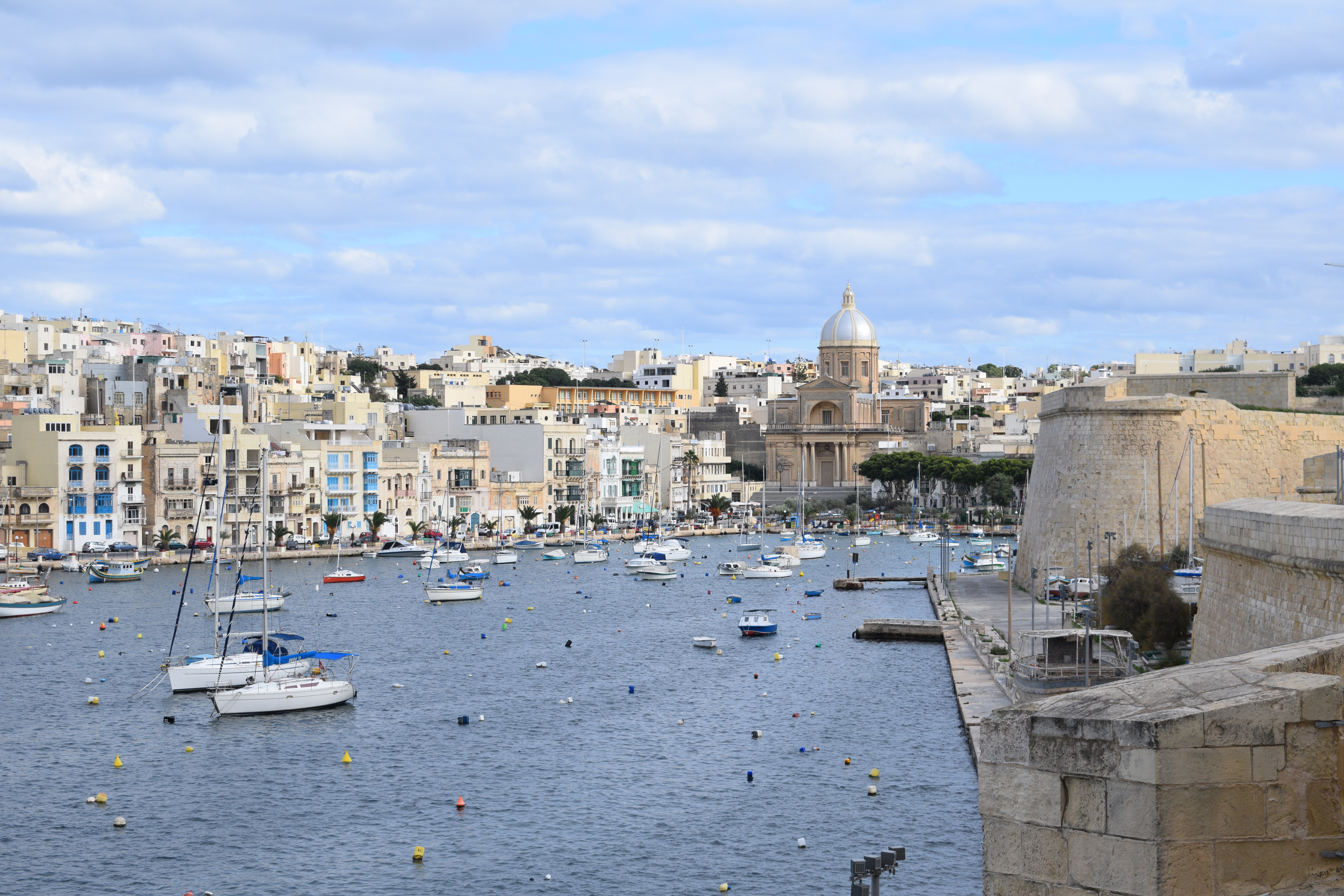
Kalkara Creek and the eponymous village, where the first cases were reported

In 1655 the plague was introduced to Malta through ships which had travelled from the Eastern Mediterranean to the island. They were anchored in Kalkara Creek, and the disease was first detected in a man from the village of Kalkara who had contact with them. The plague spread to other family members in Żabbar, and physicians were informed of the possibility of a contagious disease. Some cases later appeared in the urban area around the Grand Harbour: in Valletta, Birgu, Senglea and Bormla.

=== Containment measures ===
A medical commission was set up to investigate when the outbreak was detected, and it concluded that the disease was contagious and recommended the setting up of containment measures. Those who were infected were isolated at the Lazzaretto on Bishop's Island and those who had been in contact with them were quarantined. Their house and its contents were burnt down, and a cordon sanitaire was imposed on the town of Żabbar. When the disease appeared in the other Grand Harbour settlements, similar restrictions on movement were imposed and through these measures the outbreak was successfully contained.

During the 1655 outbreak, contact between Malta and Sicily was limited due to restrictions imposed by the Viceroy of Sicily.

== Impact ==
The outbreak caused the deaths of 20 people over a period of three months.

== See also ==
- Plague epidemics in Malta
