= 1592–1593 Malta plague epidemic =

Disease outbreak in Malta

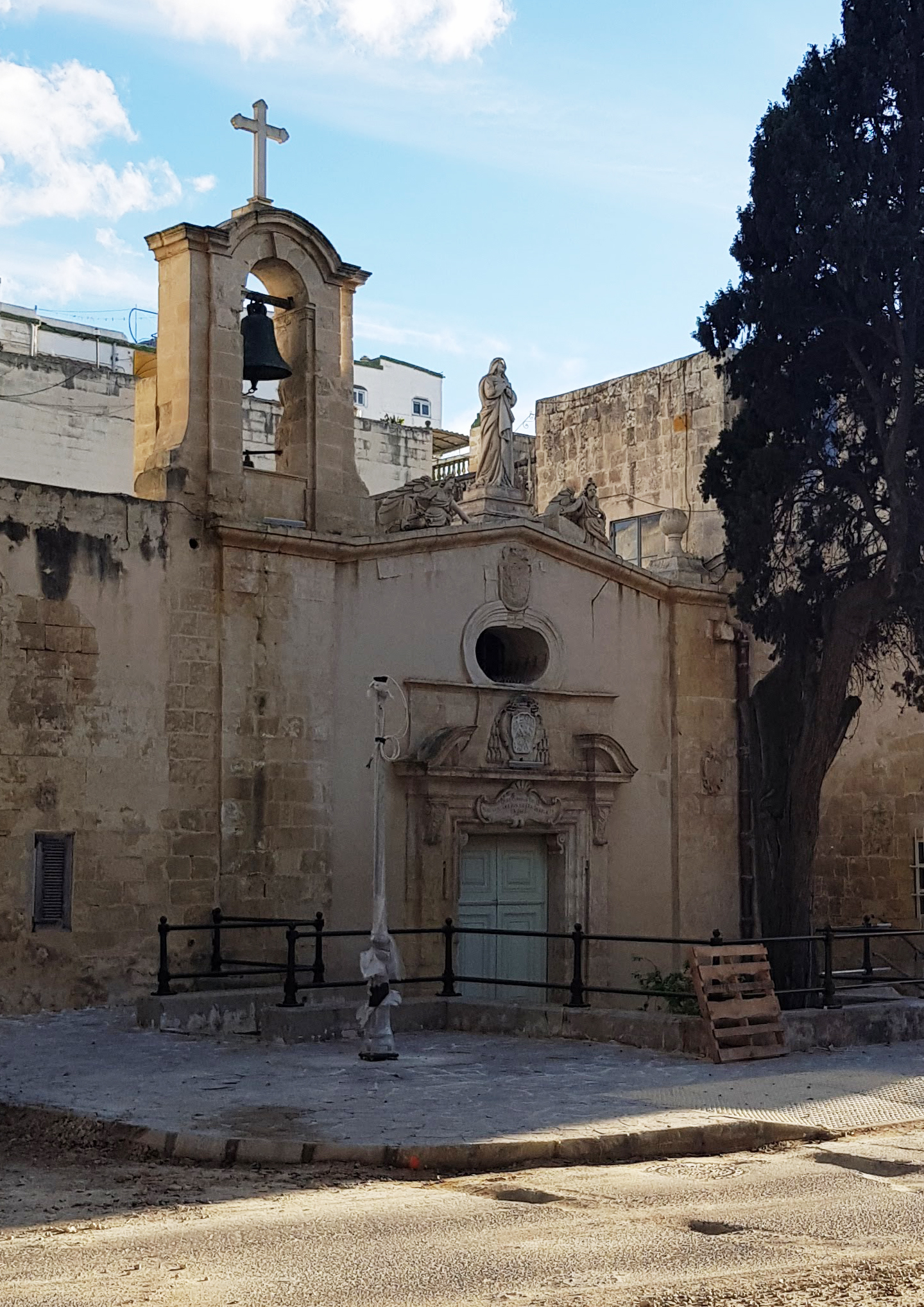
- The Church of Our Lady of Sorrows in Pietà, which was built adjacent to a cemetery for victims of the 1592–1593 epidemic
- Disease: Plague
- Pathogen: Yersinia pestis
- Location: Malta
- First outbreak: Alexandria, Egypt
- Arrival date: 7 May 1592
- Deaths: c. 3000

The 1592–1593 Malta plague epidemic was a major outbreak of plague (Maltese: pesta) on the island of Malta, then ruled by the Order of St John. It occurred in three waves between June 1592 and September 1593, during the second plague pandemic, and it resulted in approximately 3000 deaths, which amounted to about 11% of the population. The disease was imported to Malta by Tuscan galleys that had captured vessels from Alexandria. In 1593, the Order requested assistance from Sicily to deal with the epidemic, and the measures taken were effective in containing plague.

== Background ==
At the time of the outbreak, Malta was ruled by the Order of St John. Some sources state that plague was introduced in Malta in about 1575, but there are records of outbreaks of the disease in Malta before the arrival of the Order. Epidemics had occurred in 1427–1428 and 1523, with the latter being confined to the town of Birgu.

== Epidemic ==
The plague epidemic which began in 1592 arrived in Malta indirectly from Alexandria in Ottoman-ruled Egypt. Four galleys of the Grand Duchy of Tuscany or the Order of Saint Stephen had captured two vessels from Alexandria, and took their cargo and about 150 Turkish captives with them to Malta. While en route to Malta, an outbreak of the plague began on board the ships, killing 20 crew members. The galleys arrived in Malta on 7 May 1592.

The plague spread in Malta in various waves, the first of which began in June 1592. When the outbreak occurred, it was initially mistaken to be a venereal disease. The epidemic subsided by September, but a second wave began in November. This had subsided by January 1593, and it was believed that the epidemic was over. A third and final wave began in March 1593, and this was the most severe and spread quickly throughout the island. The outbreak finally ended by September 1593.

=== Containment measures ===
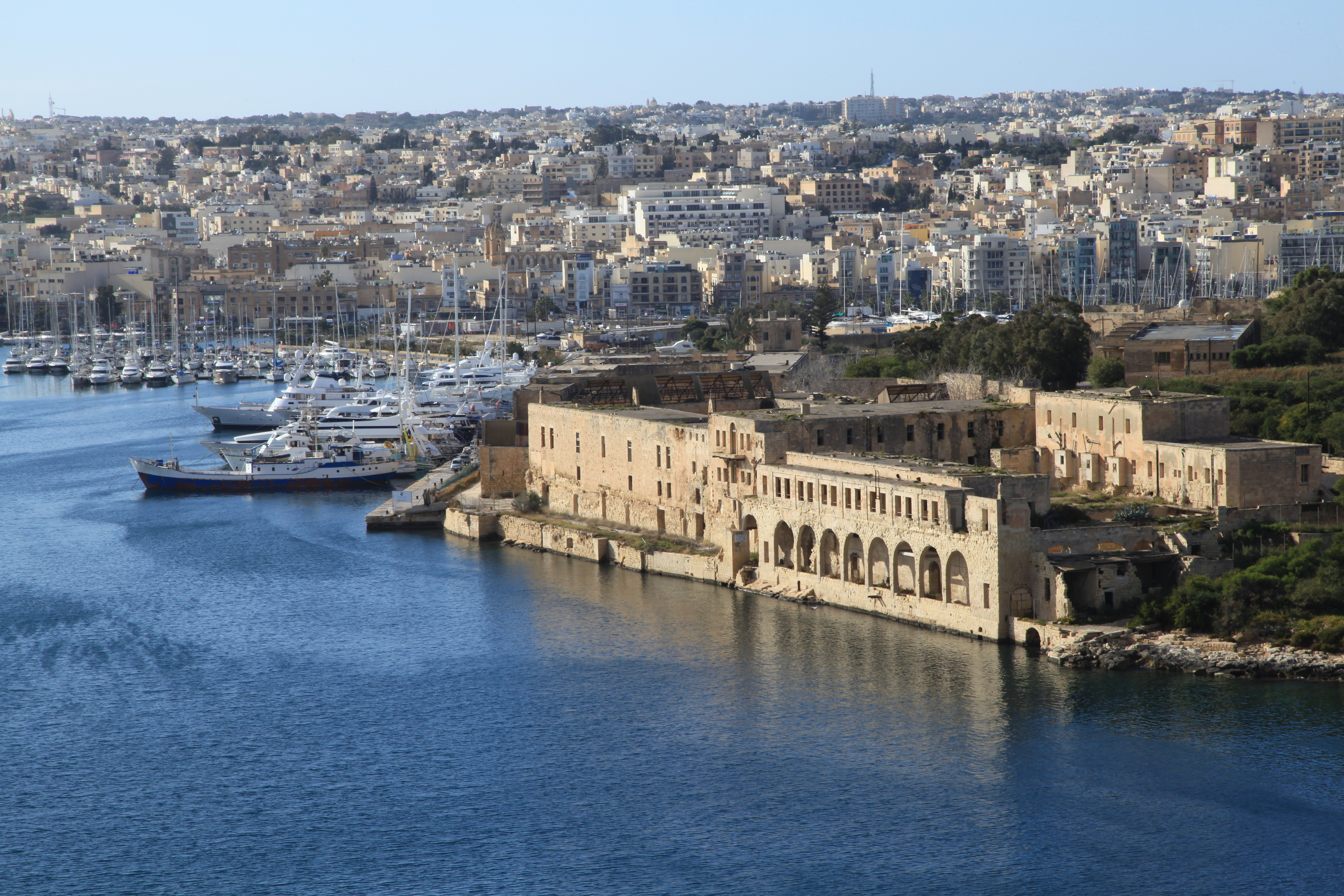
The Lazzaretto on the Isolotto (now Manoel Island), which was built in the 17th century on the site of an isolation hospital used in the 1592–1593 plague

In 1592, the Infermeria delle Schiavi of Birgu, a hospital for galley slaves which had previously housed the Sacra Infermeria before its transfer to Valletta in 1575, was converted into an isolation hospital. When the epidemic was on the decline by early 1593, its patients were transferred into a private house and the temporary hospital was closed in February.

After the outbreak became more severe in March, Grand Master Hugues Loubenx de Verdalle requested assistance from the Viceroy of Sicily, who sent the Pietro Parisi from Trapani, a doctor who had experience with contagious diseases. Upon the latter's arrival on 15 May, he took control of dealing with the outbreak along with the Health Commissioners and the Maltese doctor Gregorio Mamo. A temporary isolation hospital was set up on the island in Marsamxett Harbour known as the Isolotto (which later became known as Manoel Island). 900 suspected and confirmed cases were sent there, and they were kept separate from each other. The rest of the population was told to self-isolate in their own houses, with only one person per family being allowed to go out daily for errands. These measures was enforced with harsh penalties including flogging and death.

Washing places near the sea were set up in Valletta, Birgu and Senglea allowing suspected cases to wash in an attempt to purify themselves and their clothes. Walls of houses with confirmed or suspected cases of the disease were washed with seawater and whitewashed with lime, and similar measures were undertaken in burial grounds. In the capital, dogs were killed but cats were not, since they were seen as useful in controlling the rat population, even though at the time it was not known that rats were the cause of the disease.

The epidemic began to subside by June 1593, and attempts were made to purify the island to remove any traces of the disease which might have been left. The temporary hospital was demolished in October 1593, and pratique was granted in January 1594.

== Impact ==
=== Death toll and demographic impact ===
The death toll from the epidemic is believed to be about 3000 people, which amounted to 11% of the islands' population.

A number of small villages or hamlets lost most of their populations during the epidemic, and were later abandoned or absorbed into nearby settlements.

=== Cemeteries ===
During the plague of 1592–1593, the deceased were not buried in churches but in extramural plague cemeteries which were specially set up to deal with the epidemic. This was the first recorded instance that such cemeteries were established in Malta, and similar ones would also be set up in later major outbreaks of the disease, such as in 1675–1676 and 1813–1814.

== Legacy ==
Plague broke out again in Malta in 1623, although this outbreak was much smaller than the 1592–1593 epidemic. The outbreak began in the household of the Port Chief Sanitary Officer, and it is possible that it was caused by handling refuse from the earlier epidemic. Strict measures were taken and the 1623 outbreak was contained with only 40 deaths. Two further outbreaks would occur in Hospitaller-ruled Malta, a limited outbreak in 1655 which killed 20 people and a massive epidemic in 1675–1676 which killed some 11,300 people, a considerable part of the island's population.

In the 17th century, a permanent Lazzaretto was built on the Isolotto, on the site of the temporary plague hospital of 1592–1593.

== See also ==
- Epidemics in Malta
