= 1623 Malta plague outbreak =

Disease outbreak in Malta

- Disease: Plague
- Pathogen: Yersinia pestis
- Location: Malta
- Date: 1623
- Deaths: 40–45

The 1623 Malta plague outbreak was a minor outbreak of plague (Maltese: pesta) on the island of Malta, then ruled by the Order of St John. It was probably caused by infected materials from a major epidemic in 1592–1593, and it was successfully contained after causing 40 to 45 deaths.

== Background ==
At the time of the outbreak, Malta was ruled by the Order of St John. Between 1592 and 1593, a plague epidemic had killed about 3,000 people on the island.

== Outbreak ==
The first cases of plague in this outbreak were detected in the capital Valletta, among family members of Paulus Emilius Ramadus, the Port Chief Sanitary Officer. It is suspected that the latter had handled refuse material from the 1592–1593 epidemic which might have been infected, causing the 1623 outbreak. The disease subsequently spread to a number of other households.

=== Containment measures ===
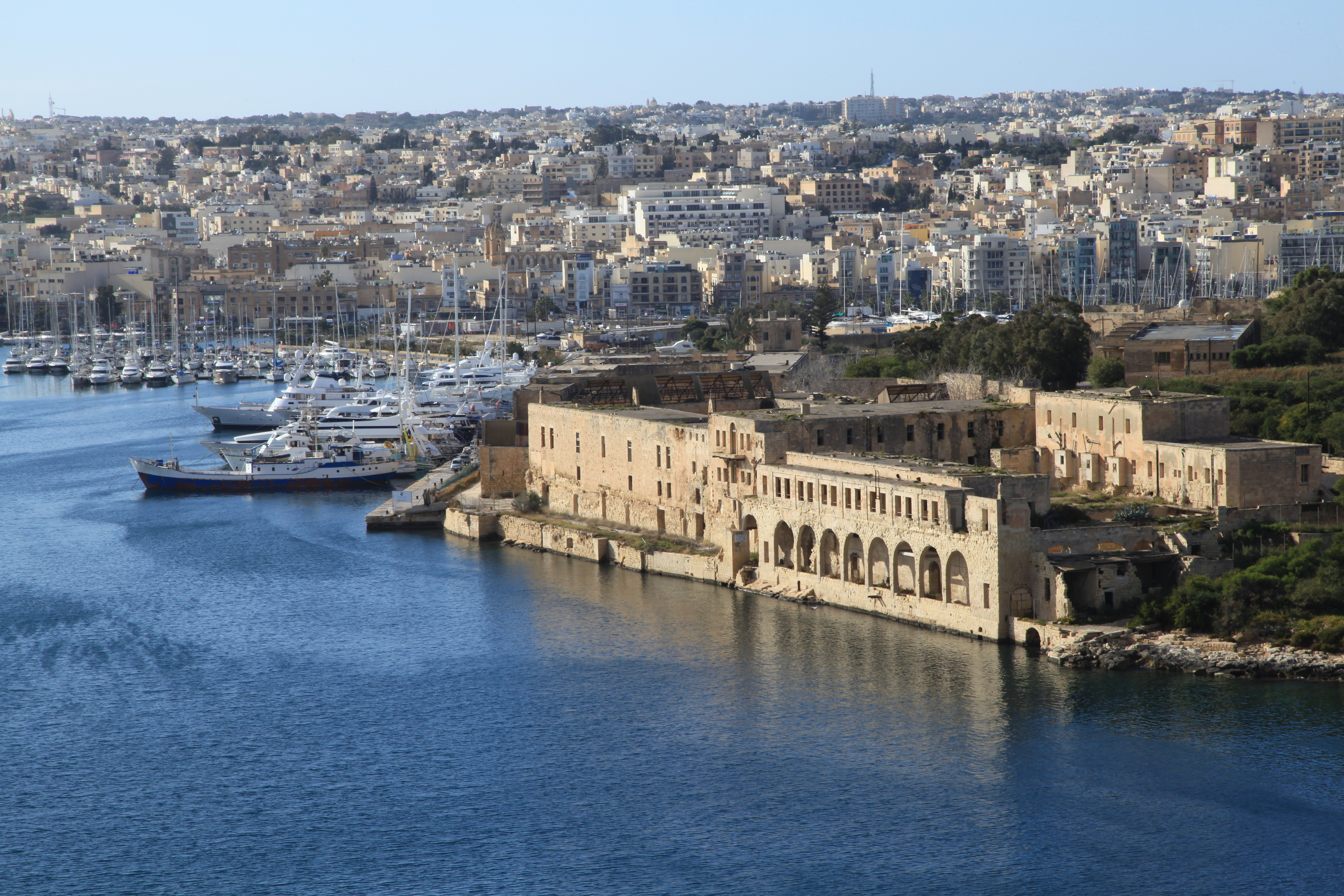
The Lazzaretto of Manoel Island (formerly Bishop's Island), a quarantine facility which was established in 1643 on the site where patients were isolated in the 1623 plague

In the 1623 outbreak health authorities implemented strict measures which managed to successfully contain the spread of the disease. Sanitary Commissioners isolated people who had been infected and those who came in contact with them on Bishop's Island in Marsamxett Harbour. Houses of infected people were guarded, and restrictions were imposed on movement between Valletta and the rest of the island. Congregations were prohibited, and other containment measures included the banning of cloaks, which were believed to facilitate contact between people.

== Impact ==
The outbreak caused the deaths of either 40 or 45 people.

== See also ==
- Plague epidemics in Malta
