= Lazzaretto of Manoel Island =

Lazzaretto
- Lazzarett
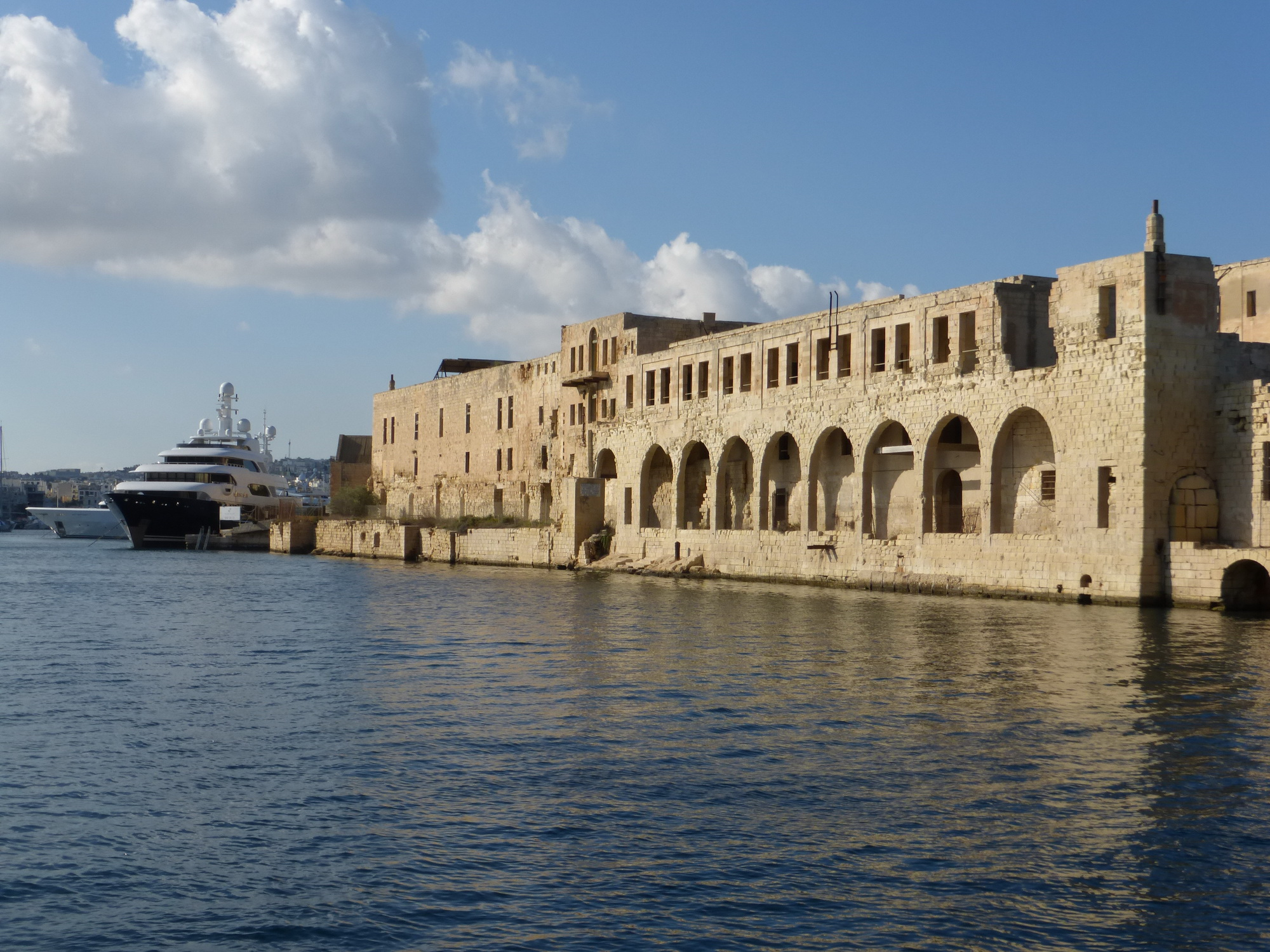
- View of the Lazzaretto
- Interactive map of the Lazzaretto area

General information
- Status: Derelict
- Type: Quarantine station
- Location: Manoel Island, Gżira, Malta
- Coordinates: 35°54′4.9″N 14°30′16″E
- Construction started: 1592 (temporary structure); 1643 (present building)
- Renovated: 1670, 1683, 1701, 1726, 1797
- Owner: Government of Malta

Technical details
- Material: Limestone

The Lazzaretto (Maltese: Lazzarett) is a former quarantine facility and hospital on Manoel Island in Gżira, Malta. It is a complex of various buildings dating back to between the 17th and 19th centuries. Most of the structures still exist, although they are in a bad state due to damage sustained during World War II and over 30 years of abandonment. It is planned that the Lazzaretto be restored.

== History ==
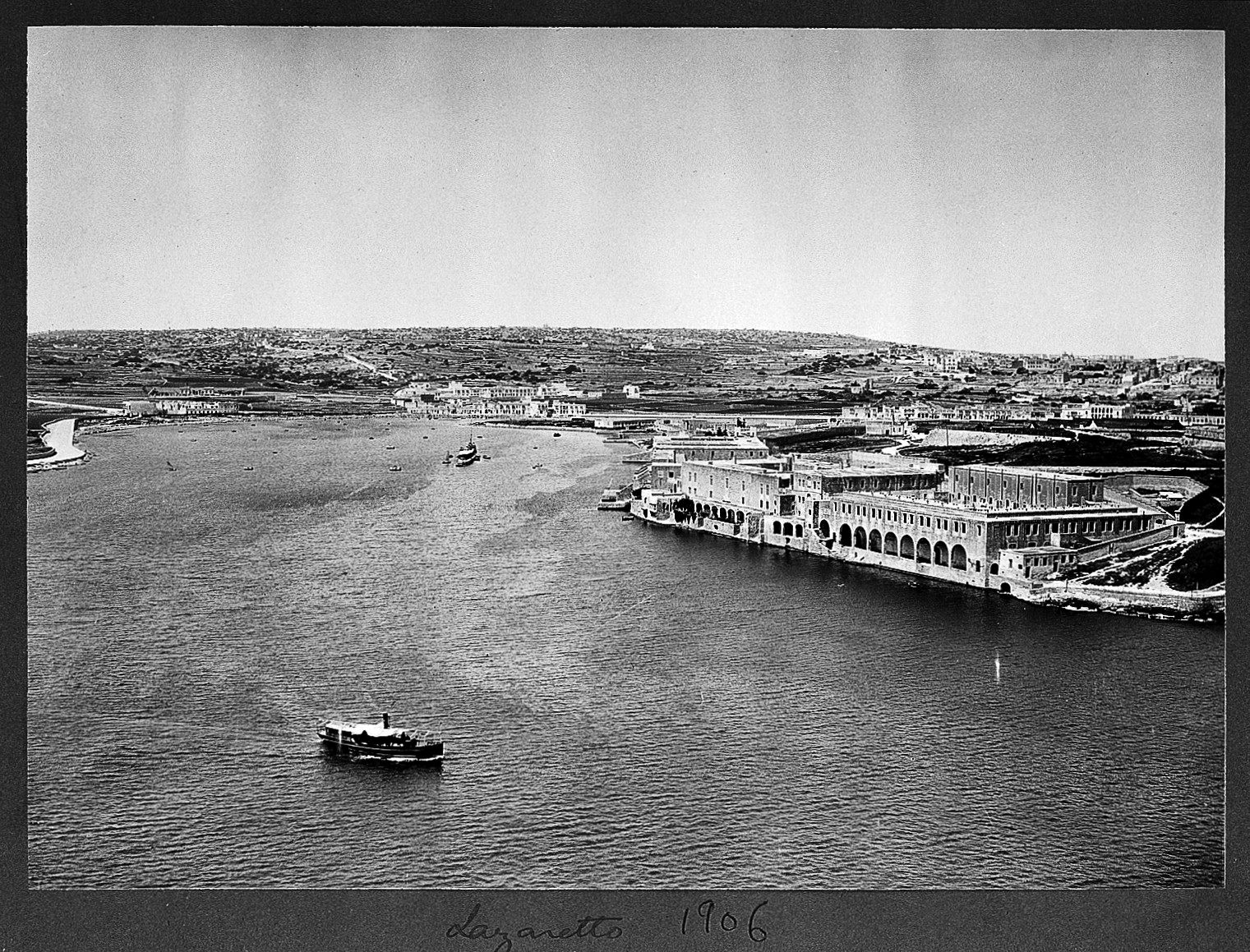

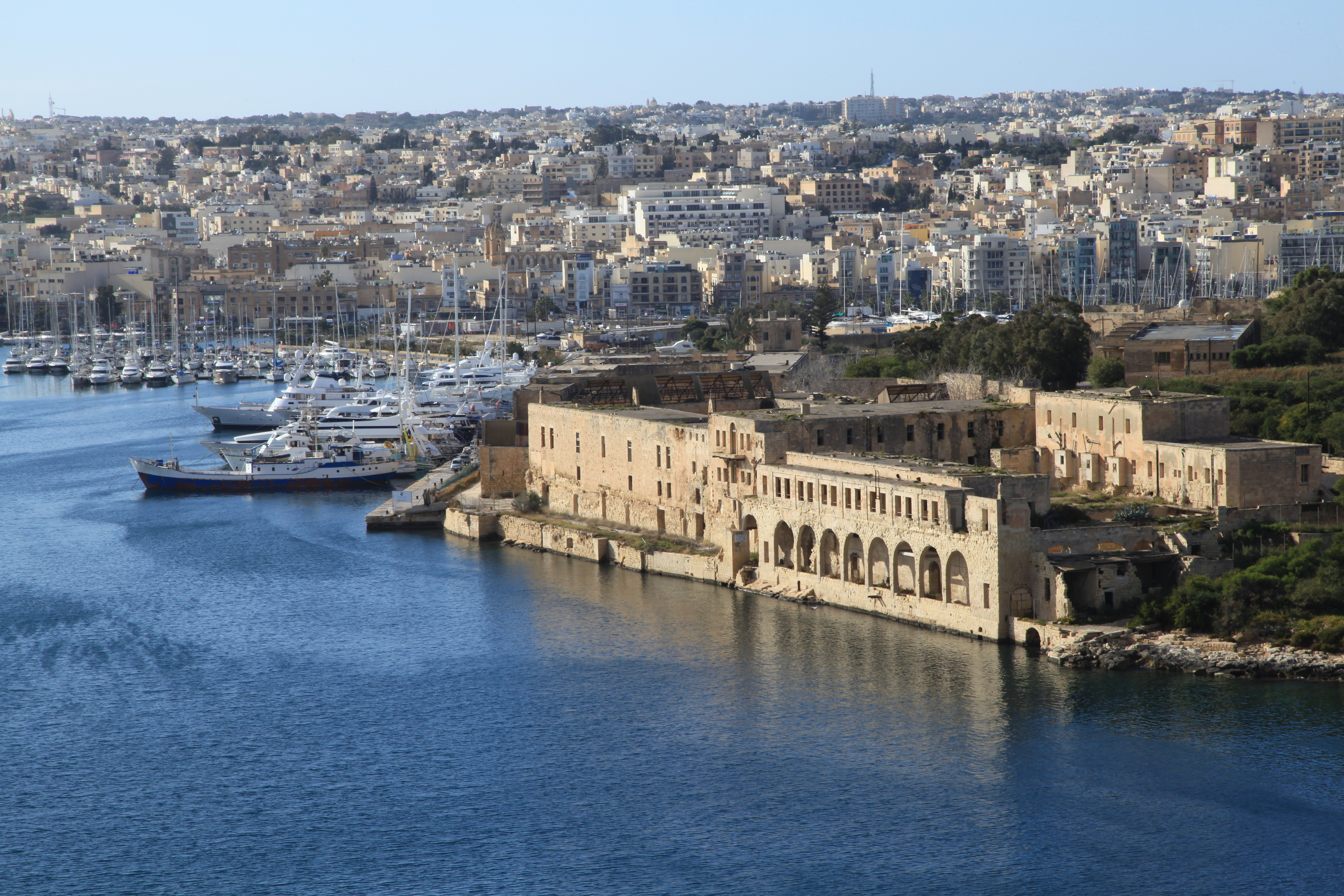
Views of the Lazzaretto complex from the bastions of Valletta in 1906 and 2013

From 1526 onwards, Marsamxett Harbour began to be used for quarantine purposes. During the plague of 1592–93, a temporary lazzaretto was constructed on the island in the middle of the harbour, then known as the Isolotto and now called Manoel Island. Some warehouses and a chapel dedicated to Saint Roch were also built at this point, but they were demolished in the late 18th century. The island was also used to isolate patients during a minor plague outbreak in 1623.

In 1643, the Grand Master of the Order of St. John, Giovanni Paolo Lascaris, decided to build a permanent lazzaretto due to fears of an epidemic. The Order acquired the island from the Church by exchanging it with some property at Tal-Fiddien. The Lazzaretto as built by Lascaris consisted of a single building, but a second block was built and expanded by Grand Masters Nicolas Cotoner in 1670, Gregorio Carafa in 1683, Ramon Perellos y Roccaful in 1701 and António Manoel de Vilhena in around 1726. In 1797, Grand Master Emmanuel de Rohan-Polduc built a new block and some warehouses in the Lazzaretto.

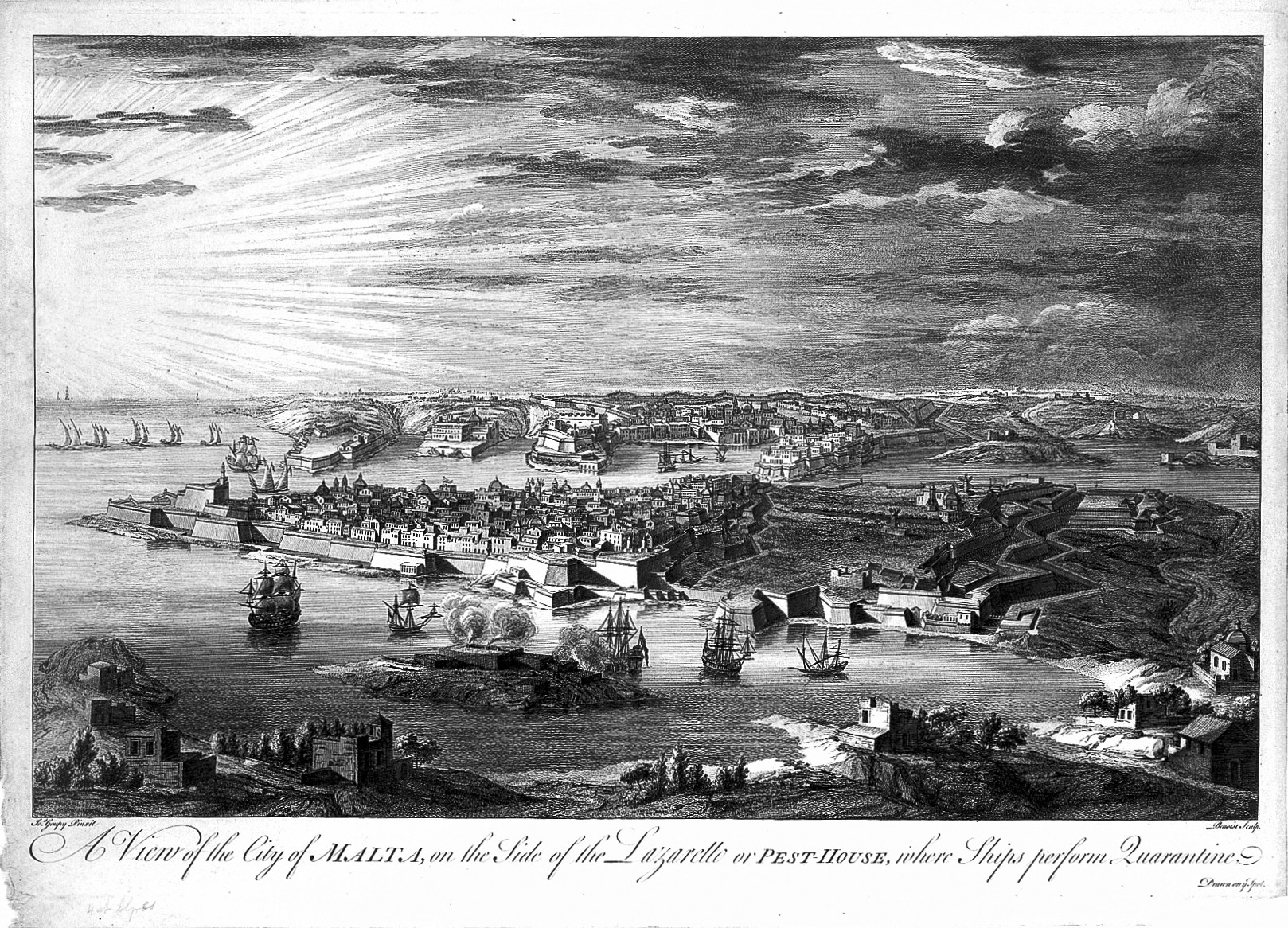
View of Manoel Island in 1720

The Lazzaretto was also used as a hospital, and it saw a lot of use during the plague epidemic of 1813–14, the cholera epidemic of 1865 and the plague epidemic of 1937. It also served as a military hospital for British, French and Italian soldiers during the Crimean War. In 1922, some refugees from the Burning of Smyrna were housed at the Lazzaretto. Several notable figures stayed in the Lazzaretto throughout its history, including Lord Byron, Sir Walter Scott, Horace Vernet, Benjamin Disraeli and Alphonse de Lamartine.

Part of the Lazzaretto which was known as the Profumo Office was used to fumigate incoming mail. Disinfected mail was marked with red wax seals from around 1816 to 1844, while a variety of cachets were used later on. Disinfection of mail on a large scale lasted until the 1880s, but was used in rare cases up to 1936.

The Lazzaretto remained in use by the health authorities until 1939, when it was requisitioned by the Admiralty to be used for military purposes during World War II. Between 1941 and 1942, it was used as a submarine depot, and the buildings were bombed a number of times by Italian or German aircraft. Many buildings were destroyed by this aerial bombardment, and some other structures had to be demolished due to the damage they had sustained.

The Lazzaretto reopened as a hospital in 1949, and remained so until the departure of the Royal Navy from Malta in the 1970s. It was subsequently abandoned, and it fell into a state of disrepair.

Since its closure, part of the Lazzaretto was also used as a shelter for abandoned dogs.

=== Present day ===
Today, the Lazzaretto is in a state of neglect, and parts of it have collapsed while others are in danger of collapsing.

The Lazzaretto is set to be restored by the development company MIDI plc, who also restored the nearby Fort Manoel and Fort Tigné. The planned restoration would include treatment of the existing stonework and reconstruction of destroyed structures. After restoration, the complex is to be converted into residences, offices, restaurants, a casino and a boutique hotel. An underground car park is also planned.

The complex is a Grade 2 national monument, and it is listed on the National Inventory of the Cultural Property of the Maltese Islands.

== Architecture ==
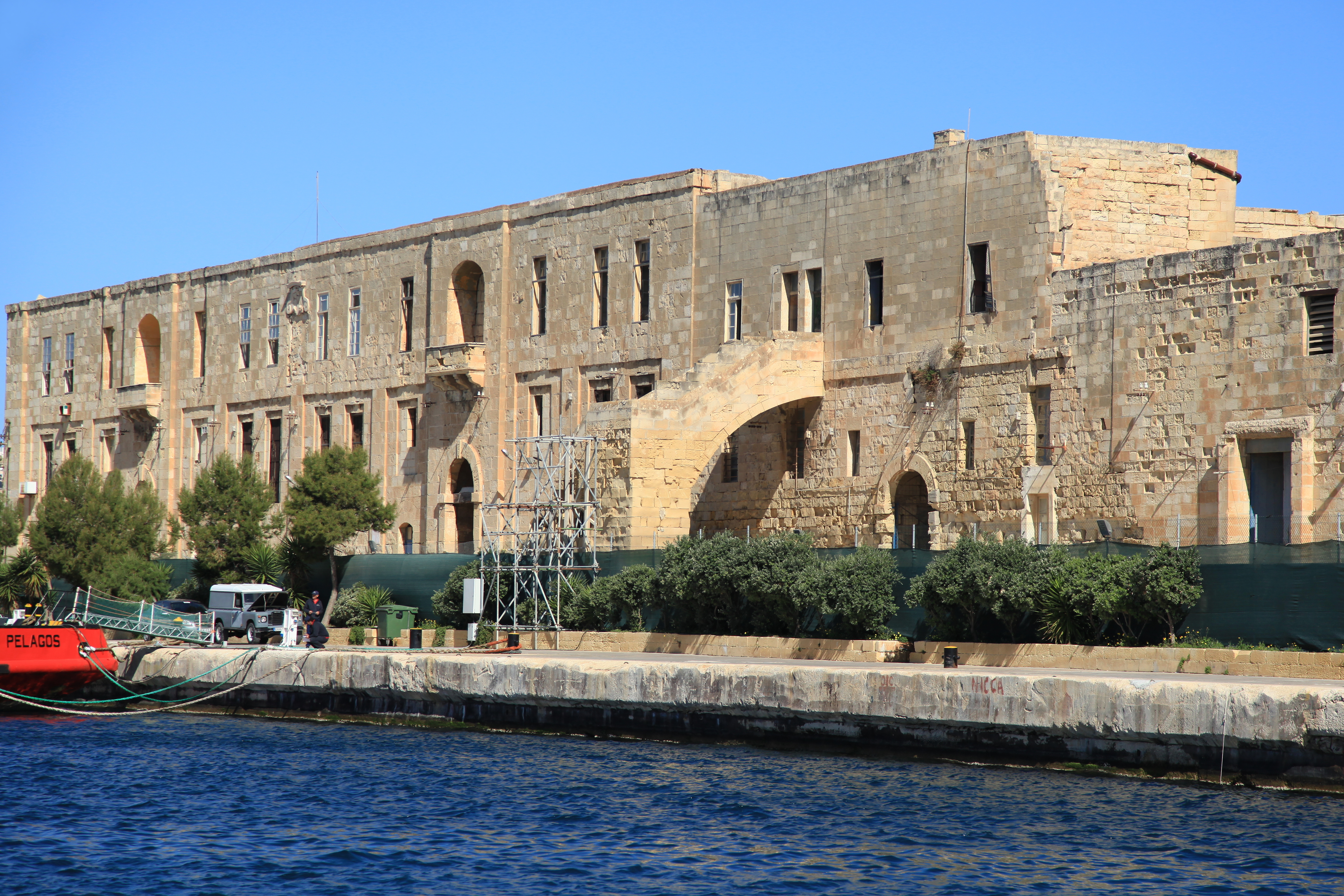
Old Palace

The Lazzaretto consists of a complex of buildings dating back to the 17th to 19th centuries. Nothing remains of the original 16th century temporary structure, and the oldest extant building within the complex is that built in 1643 during the magistracy of Grand Master Lascaris. This structure, which is known as the Palazzo Vecchio (Old Palace), the Palazzo Grande (Great Palace) or simply il-Palazz (the Palace), is two stories high and consists of eight halls built around a central courtyard. This building had a number of coats of arms on its façade, but these were defaced probably during the French occupation of Malta. The building also has two marble inscriptions, one undated and another dated 1787, while a third inscription dated 1797 was removed in the late 1960s. A copy of marble inscription dated 1814 is also affixed on the western façade of the building. The original inscription was affixed on a gallows in front of Fort Manoel, and it is now in storage in Valletta.

The complex also contains a building known as the New Palace, which was built in stages between the 1670s and the early 18th century. This block consists of warehouses built around two courtyards, and the façade facing the sea contains a series of high arches. The easternmost warehouse was demolished after it was bombed in World War II.

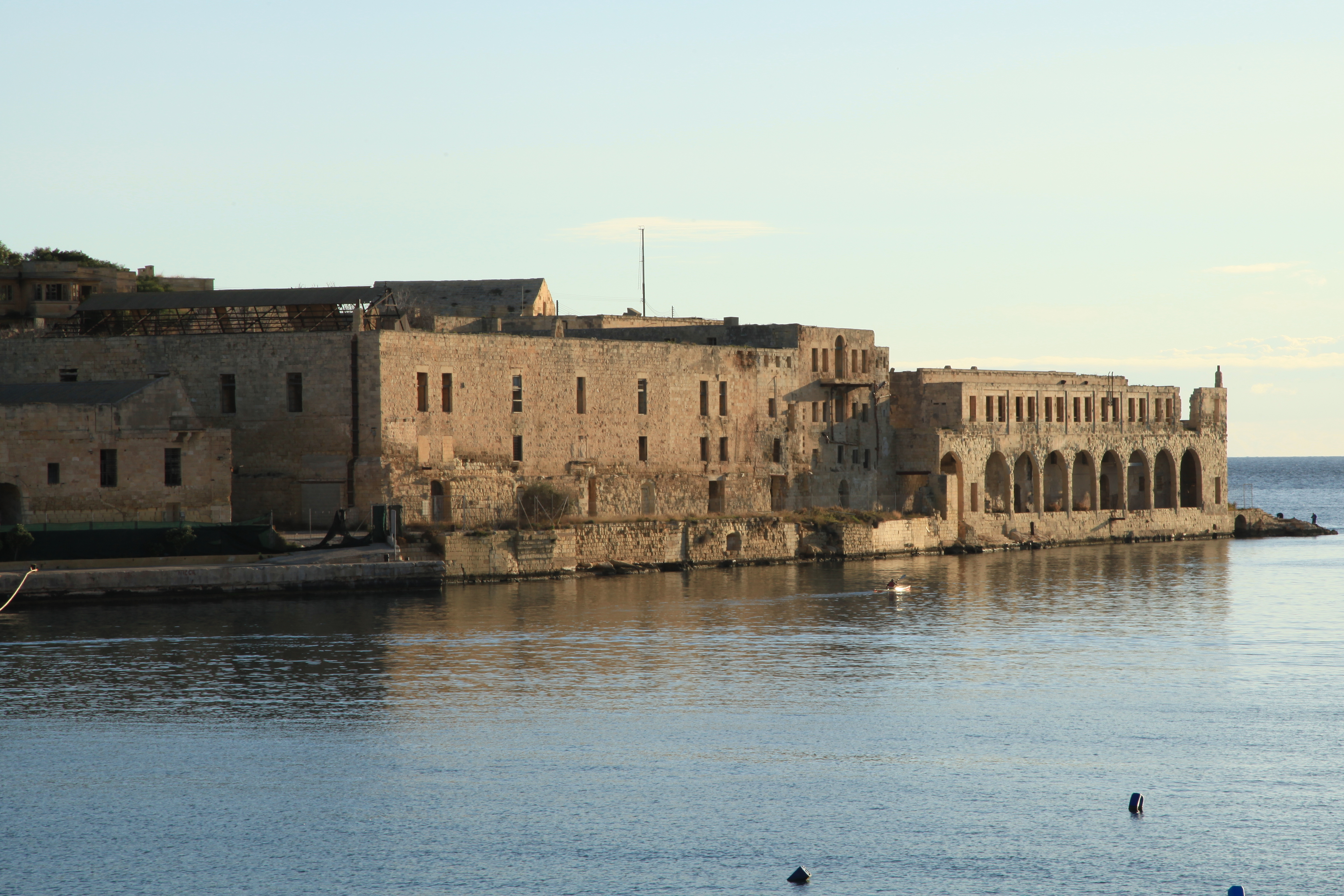
New Palace

In the 18th century, a Pest House was built near the Old Palace for the isolation of patients with the plague. A number of cattle sheds for the quarantining of animals were also built nearby. The Pest House was demolished to make way for a Disinfection Station, while the cattle sheds were destroyed in the war.

Between the Pest House and the Old Palace, there is the De Rohan Block which was completed in 1797. The Profumo Office was located near the De Rohan Block, but the building was destroyed in the war.

The Lazzaretto complex was surrounded by a high wall to prevent people from escaping. Six cemeteries were located in the area, but only one still exists today.

A number of historical graffiti can be found within the Lazzaretto, with the earliest dated 1681 and the latest 1947.
