= Plague epidemics in Malta =

Disease outbreaks in Malta

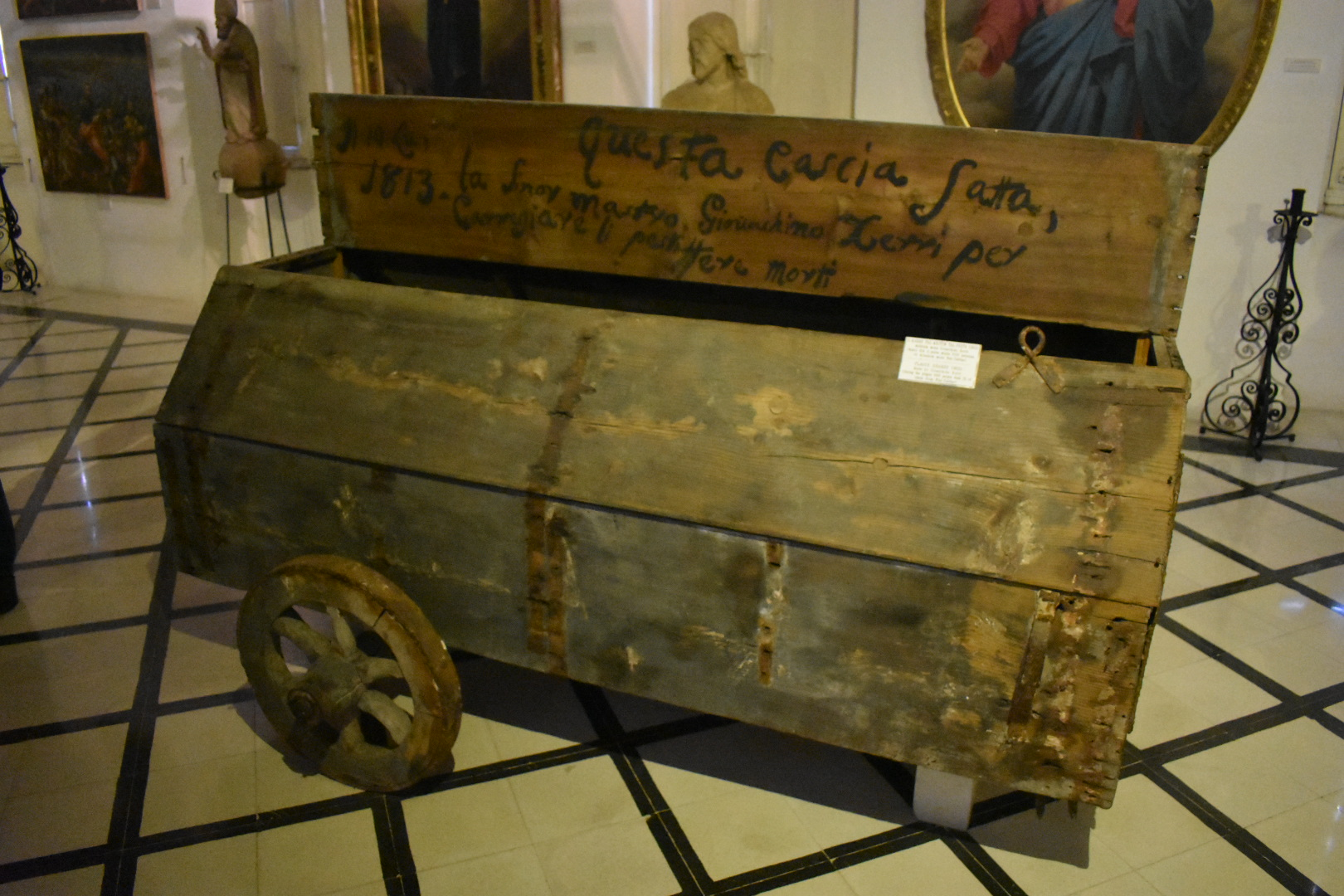
Hearse used to carry the dead during the 1813 plague epidemic, now at the Żabbar Sanctuary Museum

Several epidemics from the plague struck Malta from the medieval era until 1945, claiming almost 20,000 victims in at least ten epidemics over 350 years. After the first epidemics, preventive measures were installed, including a very active lazaret which issued patents of non-contagion for many ships plying the Mediterranean.

== Epidemics before 1530 ==
During the medieval period a number of epidemics are known to have impacted the Maltese Islands, but little information is known about them. The first plague epidemic in Malta might have occurred in the late 13th century, and a cemetery in Rabat, Gozo might have contained remains of victims from this plague.

The Black Death pandemic spread throughout Europe starting from October 1347, when a Genoese ship brought the plague to Messina in Sicily. The pandemic is believed to have reached Malta in 1348, due to the close economic and maritime relations between the two islands. The details of how the pandemic affected Malta are not known.

Other plague epidemics are known to have occurred in 1427–28, 1453, 1501, 1519 and 1523. In the latter, the disease was introduced by a galleon which had been captured. When the disease was discovered, the municipal authority of Mdina tried to isolate the crew, submerge the ship and burn its cargo. Its owners refused, and the ship was burnt. Despite this, plague still broke out in the town of Birgu and the settlement was cordoned off and isolated from the rest of the country.

Epidemics of other diseases apart from the plague also occurred. Between 1453 and November 1455, an epidemic of morbus di la gula et di la punta, possibly scarlet fever, resulted in many deaths.

== Epidemic of 1592–1593 ==
This epidemic is the first documented in Malta. The disease arrives by a ship coming from Alexandria. Around 3,300 victims are counted, more than 12% of the total population of the archipelago. Mismanagement of the disease leads to the implementation of more effective quarantine measures.

== Outbreak of 1623 ==
The disease broke out in the house of Paolo Emilio Ramucci, the guardian of the port of Malta. The disease then quickly spreads to surrounding homes. Authorities quickly isolate the infected and take quarantine measures. The disease is quickly circumscribed but still causes the death of 40 people.

== Creation of the lazaretto ==
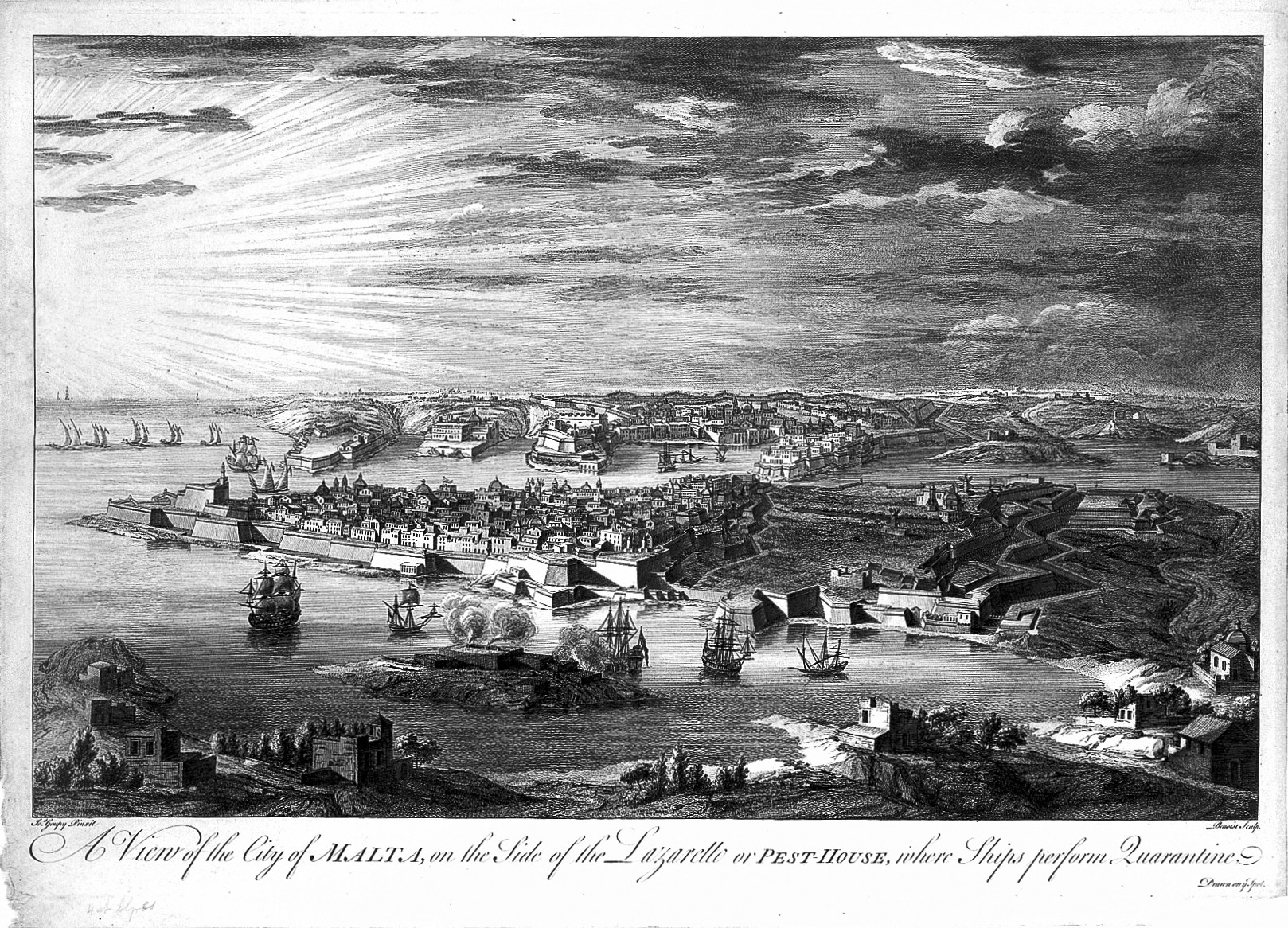
Engraving from 1770 showing in the foreground the quarantine district of Manoel Island

Malta acquired a lazaret in 1643 on the island of Marsamxett Harbour long after the installations of the lazaretto of Venice in 1403 and the Marseille in 1526. This lazaret's organization quickly made Malta one of the safest ports in the Mediterranean. The Maltese non-contagion license, issued after quarantine and controlled by health authorities, allows Maltese ships to dock directly at ports in Western Europe. The sanitary stopover in Malta continues to contribute to Maltese economic development.

== Outbreak of 1655 ==
The third epidemic began in September 1655 in a house near the "Porta Maggiore" (today the "Victoria Gate") near a place of anchoring of ships coming from the Levant. The owner is said to have had contact with a crew member of an infected vessel, and to have transmitted the disease to his sister inhabiting Żejtun. When the disease spreads to other family members, the authorities immediately take quarantine measures by isolating people in contact with the lazaretto. The epidemic was quickly brought under control with around a hundred patients, 52 of whom survived thanks to effective medical care. The assessment is of fifty victims.

== Epidemic of 1675–1676 ==
This fourth epidemic of unknown origin is the deadliest known in Malta. It killed 11,300 persons, about a quarter of the Maltese population, and even more in the Grand Harbour area, many of which are knights. The help of French doctors and surgeons from Marseille will prove very useful.

== Epidemic of 1813–1814 ==
This epidemic, the first under British administration, has been carried by ship since Alexandria. The disease first spreads slowly to Valletta before ravaging the countryside, and in particular the cities of Ħaż-Żebbuġ and Qormi where about 15% of their inhabitants died. Late draconian measures will eventually put an end to the scourge, which briefly reaches Gozo at the end of the epidemic.

Between April 1813 and September 1814, the epidemic killed 4668 of a Maltese population estimated at about 100,000, with a total mortality of 4 to 6%.

== Outbreak of 1917 ==
A small epidemic of plague infected 8 dockers at the Grand Harbor in 1917, with 4 deaths between 2 March and 2 April 1917. The disease stems from the opening of a box from Mesopotamia, where an epidemic raged.

== Outbreak of 1936–1937 ==
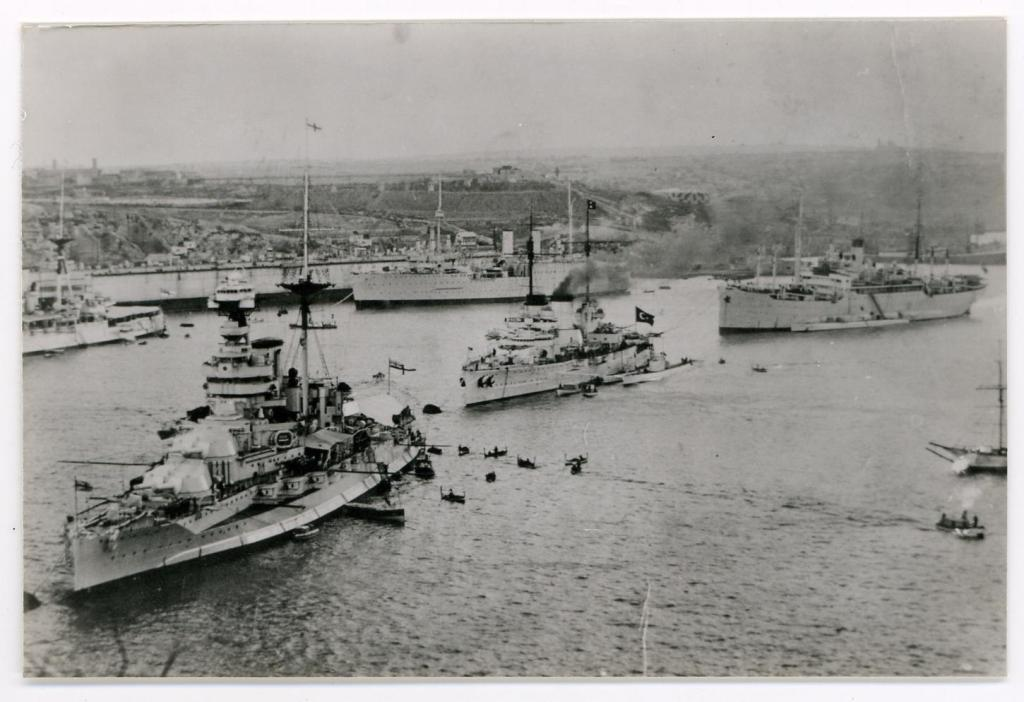
The port of Malta in 1936

A plague began in 1936 in Qormi with the Grech family, a family of bakers from Raffaella Street. The grandfather first presented buboes and a high fever before dying on April 8. It was then the turn of his 42-year-old son on April 13. The 20-year-old grandson was also reached and transferred to the lazaretto and survived. Then neighbours begin to be reached. The origin remains unclear, perhaps from hay bales and straws imported from Tunisia. In total in Qormi, eight people will be affected in 13 months of the epidemic, four of whom will die. A health barrier around Qormi is installed, but proves to be ineffective. The plague soon spreads to the neighboring village of Żebbuġ where eleven people are infected with three deaths, including a girl aged 7. The disease was also found in Rabat, Mtaħleb, Marsa, Attard, Mosta and maybe Gozo. The plague lingers until 1937 with another five cases in Luqa including one fatal and one case in Qrendi.

Significant research was carried out by Themistocles Zammit, who succeeded in isolating plague bacillus cultures from 15 of the 1,500 rats studied. He discovers that the main vector is the Black Rat (Rattus rattus), fairly recently established on the Maltese Islands, whose proliferation was making it take the place of the former local rat, the brown rat (Rattus norvegicus).

In total, and according to the different counts, between 25 and 33 people were infected, killing between eight and twelve people.

== See also ==
- Cholera epidemics in Malta
