= Manoel Island =

Island of Malta

Native name: Il-Gżira Manoel
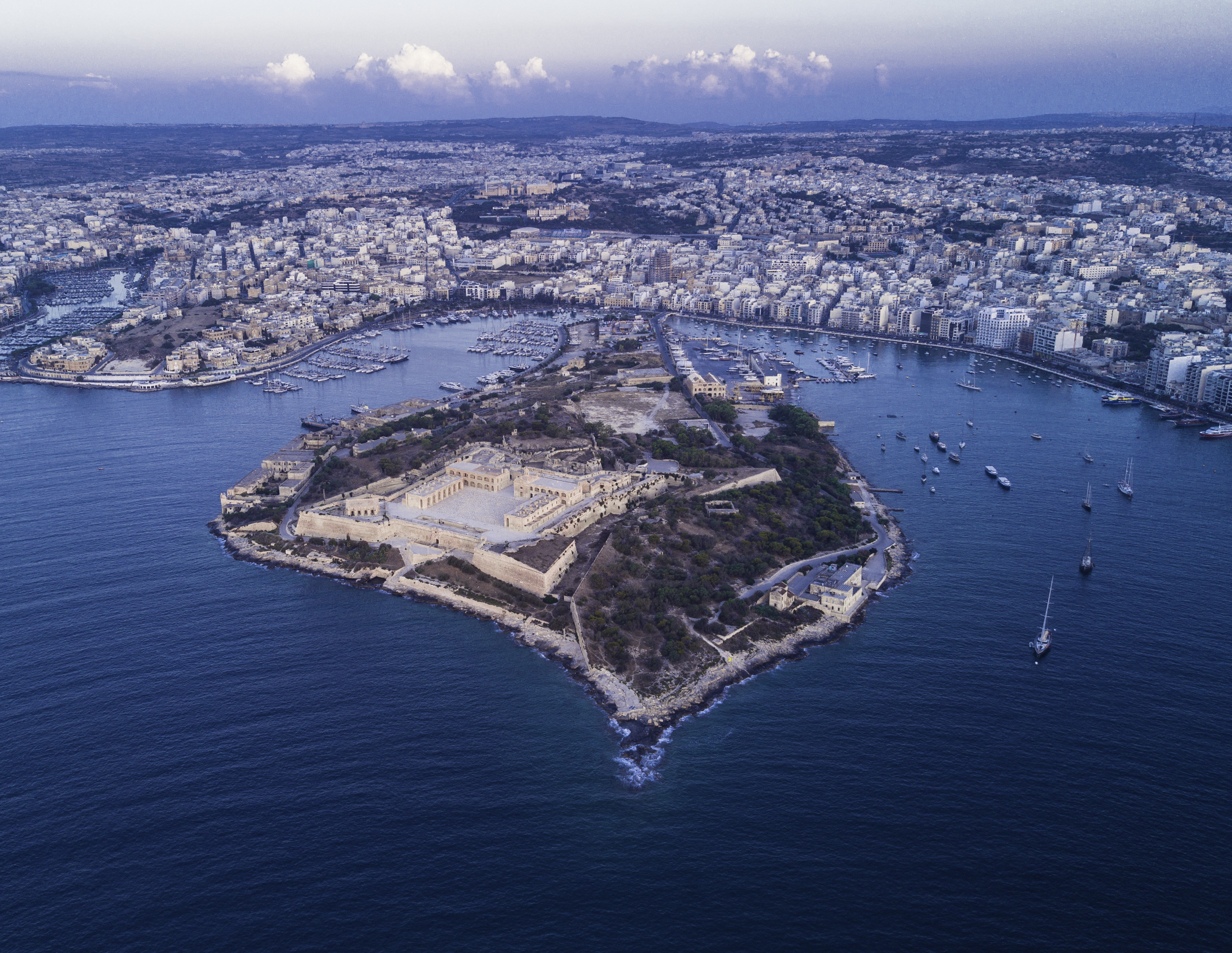
- Aerial view of Manoel Island

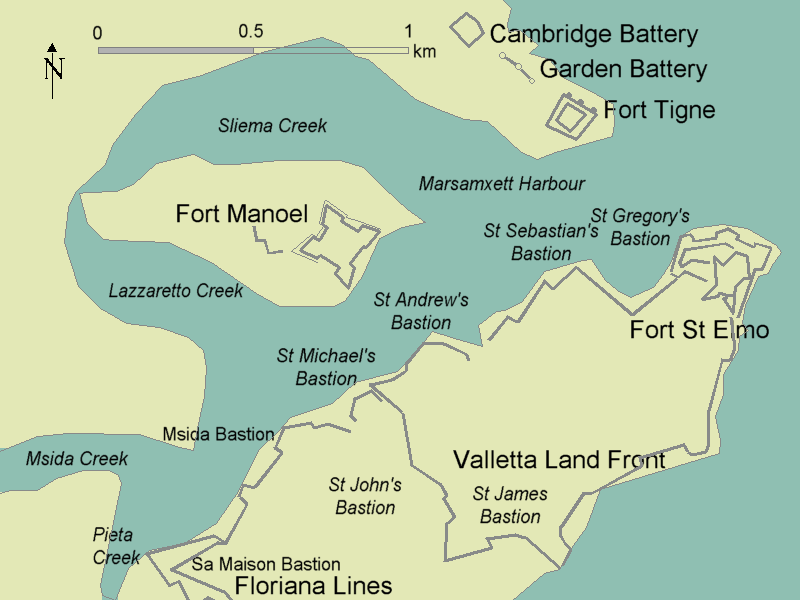
- Map of Manoel Island within Marsamxett Harbour

Geography
- Location: Marsamxett Harbour, Malta, Mediterranean Sea
- Coordinates: 35.904°N 14.502°E
- Archipelago: Maltese islands
- Area: 0.3 km^{2} (0.12 sq mi)

Administration
- Malta

Manoel Island (Maltese: Il-Gżira Manoel), formerly known as Bishop's Island (Maltese: Il-Gżira tal-Isqof, Italian: Isola del Vescovo) or the Isolotto, is a small island which forms part of the municipality of Gżira in Marsamxett Harbour, Malta. It is named after the Portuguese Grand Master António Manoel de Vilhena, who built a fort on the island in the 1720s. The island was in turn renamed after the fort.

== Geography ==
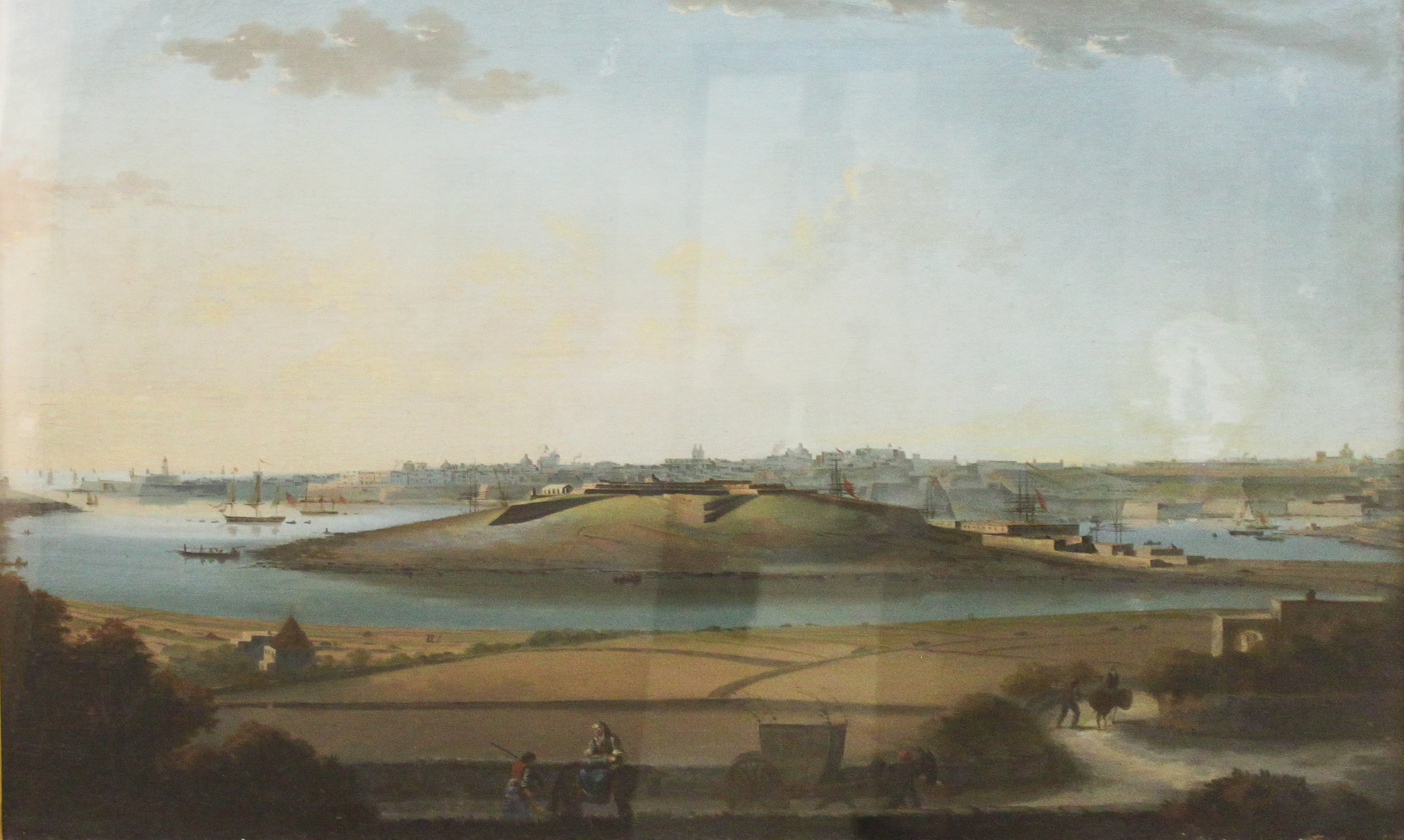
Painting of Manoel Island in the 19th century

Manoel Island is a low, rather flat hill, shaped roughly like a leaf. It is located in the middle of Marsamxett Harbour, with Lazzaretto Creek to its south and Sliema Creek to its north. The island is connected to mainland Malta by a bridge. The whole island can be viewed from the bastions of the capital Valletta.

== History ==
In 1570, the island was acquired by the Cathedral Chapter of Mdina and it became the property of the Bishop of Malta. It was therefore called l'Isola del Vescovo or il-Gżira tal-Isqof in Maltese (the Bishop's Island).

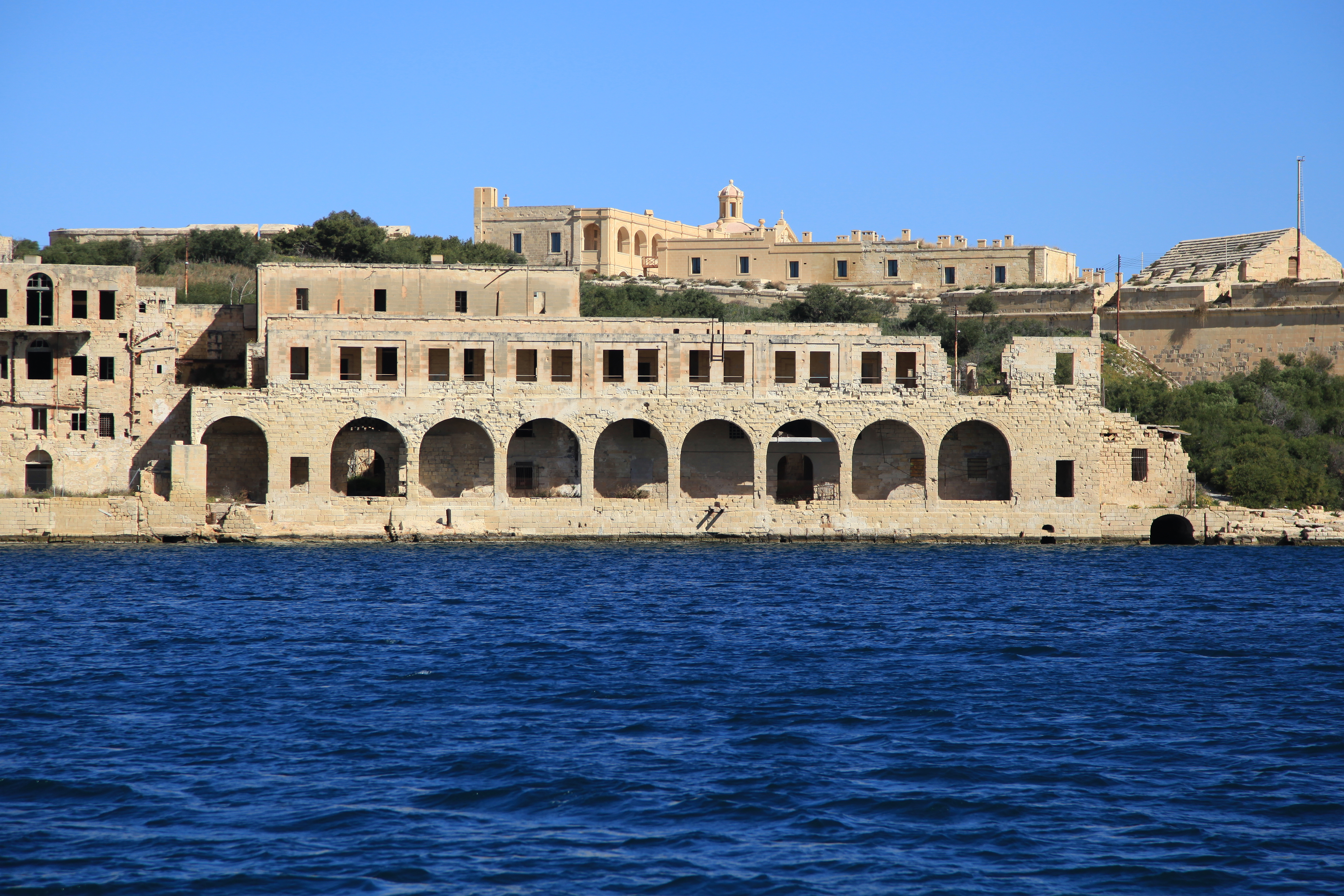
Lazzaretto

In 1592, a quarantine hospital known as the Lazzaretto was built during an outbreak of the plague. The hospital was made of wooden huts, and it was pulled down a year later after the disease had subsided. In 1643, during the reign of Grandmaster Lascaris, the Order of Saint John exchanged the island with the church for some land in Rabat and built a permanent Lazzaretto in an attempt to control the periodic influx of plague and cholera on board visiting ships. It was initially used as a quarantine centre where passengers from quarantined ships were taken. The hospital was subsequently improved during the reigns of Grandmasters Cotoner, Carafa and de Vilhena.

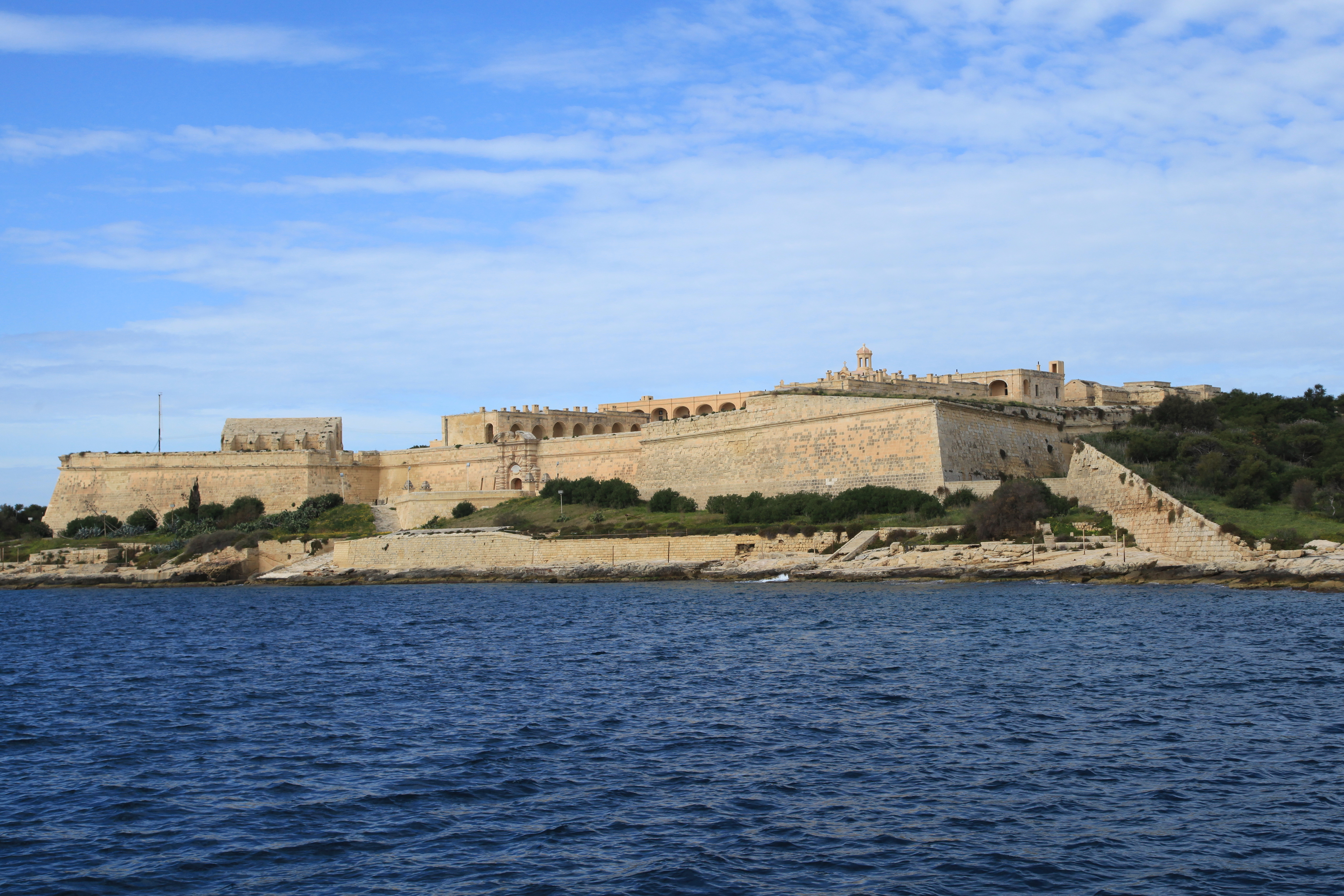
Fort Manoel

Between 1723 and 1733, a new star fort was built on the island by the Portuguese Grand Master António Manoel de Vilhena. The fort was called Fort Manoel after the Grand Master, and the island was renamed at this point. The fort is considered a typical example of 18th-century military engineering, and its original plans are attributed to René Jacob de Tigné, and are said to have been modified by his friend and colleague Charles François de Mondion, who is buried in a crypt beneath Fort Manoel. The fort has a magnificent quadrangle, parade ground and arcade, and once housed a baroque chapel dedicated to St. Anthony of Padua, under the direct command of the Order.

In the British period, the Lazzaretto continued to be used and was enlarged during the governorship of Sir Henry Bouverie in 1837 and 1838. It was briefly used to house troops but was converted back into a hospital in 1871. During the course of the 19th century, some incoming mail was fumigated and disinfected at the Profumo Office of the hospital to prevent the spread of diseases.

During World War II, when Malta was under siege, Manoel Island and its fort were used as a naval base by the Royal Navy's 10th Submarine Flotilla, at which time it was referred to as "HMS Talbot" or "HMS Phœnicia". The Chapel of St. Anthony was destroyed following a direct hit by Luftwaffe bombers in March 1942. The island and the fort remained derelict for many years and Fort Manoel and the Lazzaretto were both vandalized.

== Present day ==
=== MIDI plc Concession and Manoel Island: Post Għalina ===
In 2000, a concession agreement was signed between the Government of Malta and MIDI plc, a consortium of local companies. This agreement granted MIDI a concession of 99 years over Manoel Island and Tigné Point, with the aim to construct mixed-use developments and restore the dilapidated historic buildings on both sites, while maintaining public access to the foreshore. Tigné Point was subsequently developed, including a shopping mall and luxury residential apartments, but the development of Manoel Island was stalled.

In 2016, activists from Moviment Graffitti, together with other local organisations and the Gżira local council, carried out non-violent direct actions to ensure access to the foreshore, which access was illegally blocked by MIDI. Eventually, an agreement to safeguard public access to the foreshore was reached.

In March 2025, activists and residents started a campaign urging the Government to rescind the concession in light of the fact that MIDI did not keep to timelines stipulated in the concession, and to turn the site into a national park for all to enjoy. An official parliamentary petition was created and gathered over 29,000 signatures. In June 2025, the Government acquiesced to these demands and announced plans to turn the site into a public park. In March 2026, Minister Owen Bonnici announced that a deal had been concluded to acquire Manoel Island from MIDI for 43 million euros, with the government opting for an immediate agreement rather than the prospects of lengthy litigation.

=== Yacht Marina and Yacht Yard ===
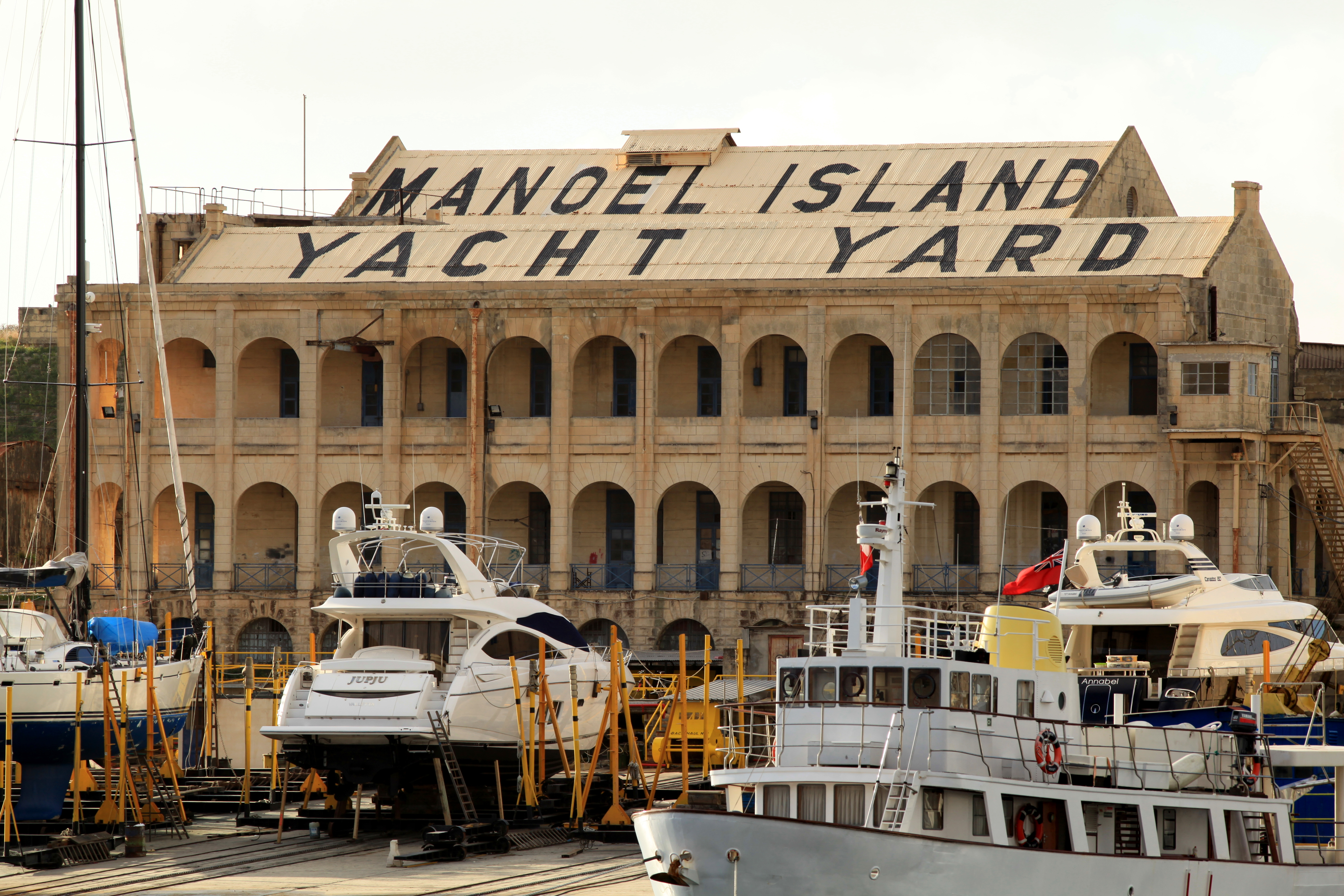
Manoel Island Yacht Yard

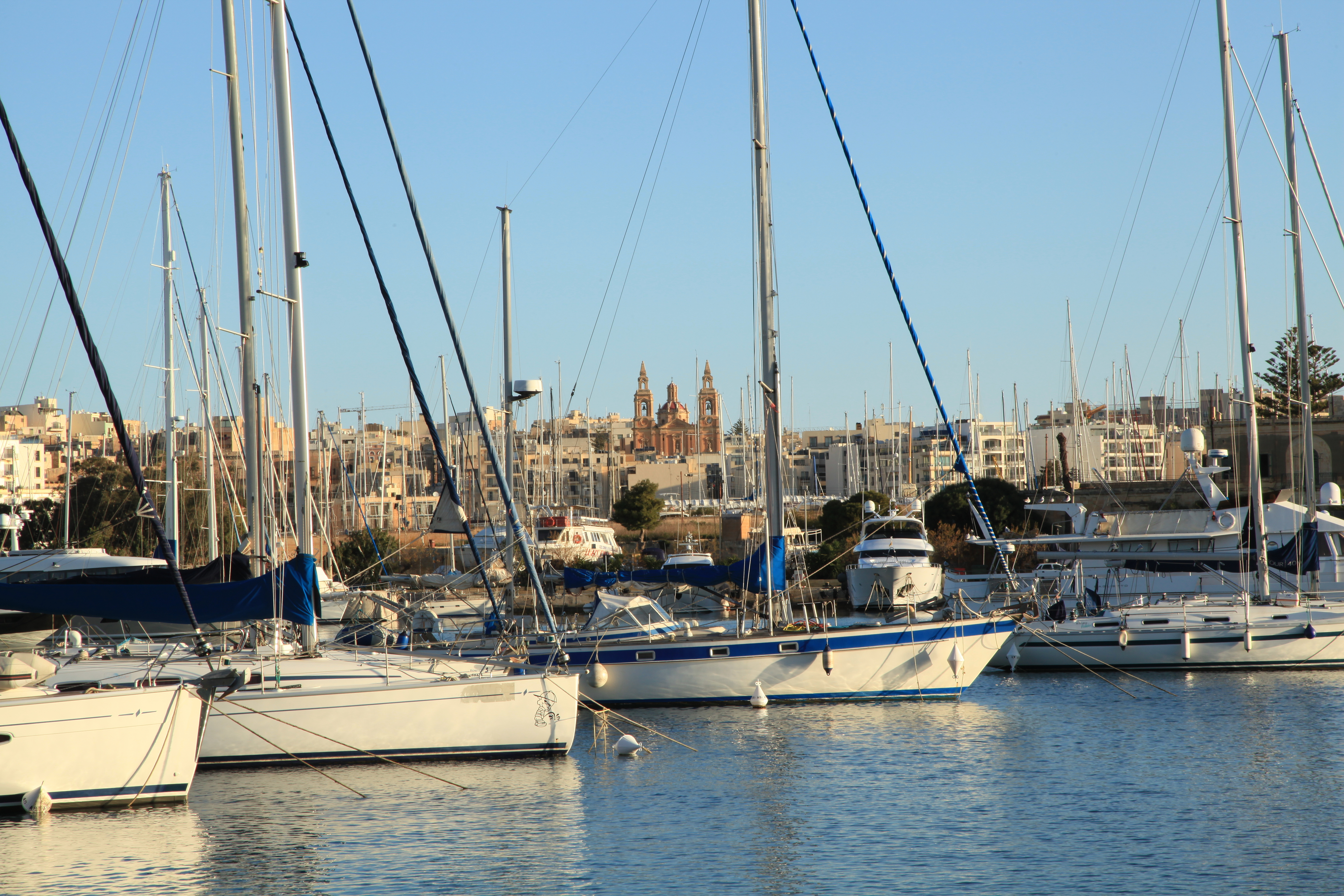
Manoel Island Yacht Marina

Manoel Island currently houses a yacht yard and a yacht marina. The yacht marina, which has been under new management since 2011, accommodates vessels up to 100 metres in length, 9 metres in draft and has 220 berths.

The yacht yard can accommodate yachts and catamarans of up to 50 metres in length and a displacement of 500 tons. The yard offers boat storage, berthing afloat, repairs and complete refits.

=== Duck Village ===
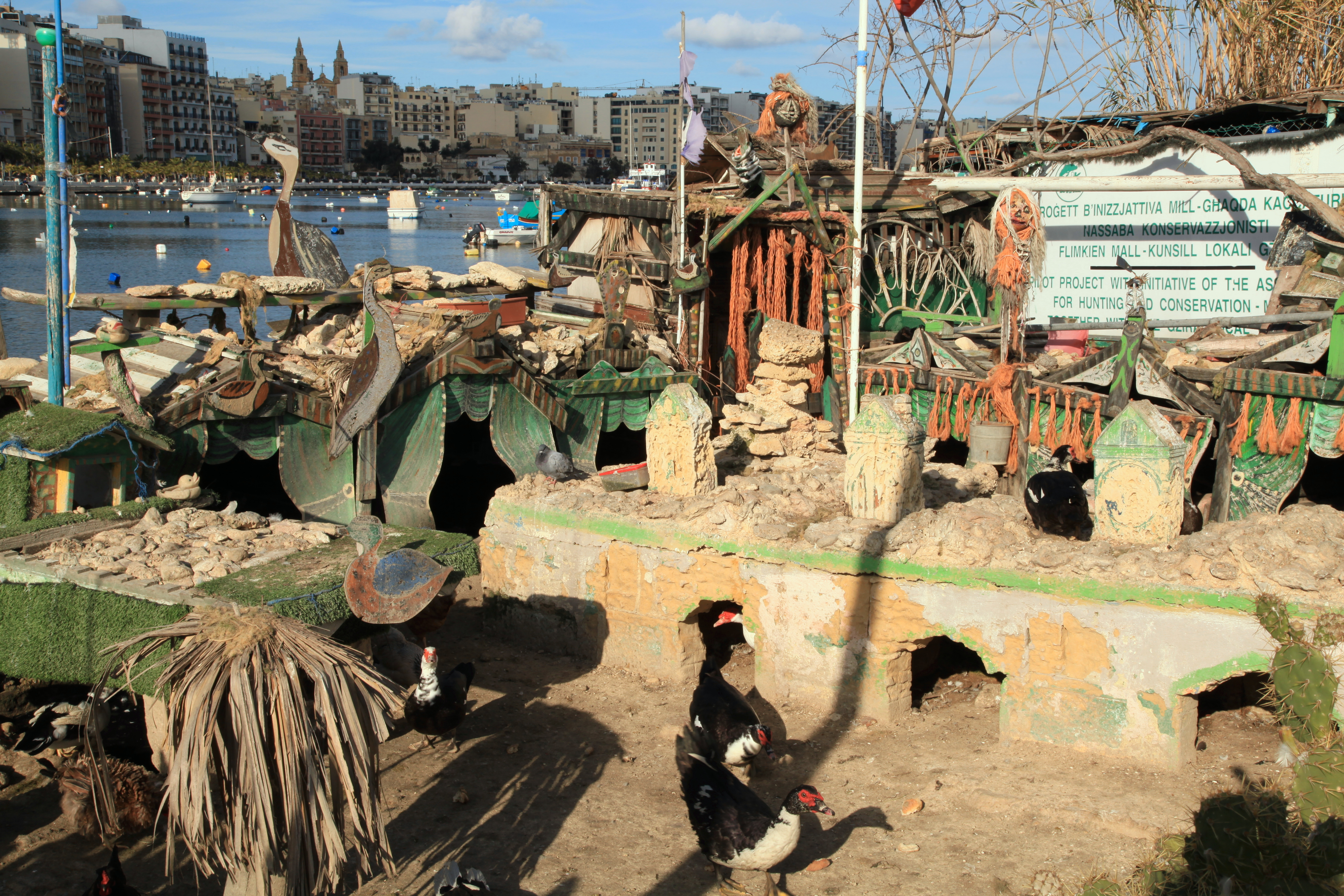
Duck Village

For several years, Manoel Island housed a quaint, informal sanctuary for ducks and other waterfowl near the bridge connecting the island with the main island. The sanctuary was created and maintained by a local volunteer, and funded entirely by private donations. The site was demolished in 2021, due to several complaints about unsanitary conditions by residents and activists.

=== Fireworks Displays ===
Annual fireworks displays that can be viewed from Sliema are launched from Manoel Island in July and August each year, during the local village feasts.
