= List of University of Zambia people =

This is a list of people associated with the University of Zambia.

== Government ==
=== Heads of State ===
- Levy Mwanawasa, late Zambian president, studied law at UNZA
- Edgar Lungu, former Zambian president, studied law at UNZA
- Emmerson Mnangagwa, President of the Republic of Zimbabwe
- Hakainde Hichilema, current Zambian President

=== Vice-Presidents ===
- Inonge Wina, former vice president of Zambia, obtained a BA degree at UNZA
- George Kunda, former vice president of Zambia

=== Cabinet level ===
- Nkandu Luo, Professor of Microbiology and Immunology and former head of Pathology and Microbiology at the University Teaching Hospital, Lusaka, Zambia
- Margaret Mwanakatwe, Minister of Finance
- Chitalu Chilufya, Minister of Health
- Brian Mushimba, Minister of Higher Education

=== Supreme Court ===
- Ireen Mambilima, late Chief Justice of Zambia
- Florence Mumba, Judge of the Khmer Rouge Tribunal and Justice of the Supreme Court of Zambia

=== Members of Parliament ===
- Jonas Chanda, Member of the National Assembly for Bwana Mkubwa
- Stanley Kakubo, Member of the National Assembly for Kapiri Mposhi
- Highvie Hamududu, former Member of the National Assembly for Bweengwa

=== International ===
- Chileshe Kapwepwe, Secretary General of the Common Market for Eastern and Southern Africa
- Ruhakana Rugunda, Prime Minister of Uganda
- Nahas Angula, Namibian Minister of Defence
- Brigitte Mabandla, former South African Minister of Public Enterprises

=== Ambassadors ===
- Monica Nashandi, Namibian ambassador and 1983 graduate
- Inonge Mbikusita-Lewanika, Zambian Ambassador to the United States of America.

=== Opposition leaders ===
- Edith Nawakwi, Leader of the Forum for Democracy and Development and former Minister of Finance.

== Business ==
- Justin Chinyanta, investment banker
- Mizinga Melu, Chief Executive Officer, Barclays Bank of Zambia
- Chibamba Kanyama, business Leader and writer
- Thandi Ndlovu, South African businesswoman and medical doctor
- Bokani Soko, Zambian businessman and sponsor of Lusaka Dynamos Football Club

== Medicine ==
- Alimuddin Zumla, Professor of Infectious Diseases and International Health at University College London Medical School
- Aaron Mujajati, physician
- Mushaukwa Mukunyandela, neurologist

== Other alumni ==
- Michael Burawoy, sociologist
- Diana Chikotesha, physical and civic education master's degrees
- Edward Makuka Nkoloso, founder of the Zambia National Academy of Science, Space Research and Philosophy
- Mulenga Kapwepwe, patron of the arts
- Dambisa Moyo, economist
- Ellen Banda-Aaku, writer
- John Matshikiza, South African actor
- Muyoba Macwan, physicist
- Lucy Muyoyeta, women's rights activist, social development consultant and writer
