= SCM =

SCM may refer to:

== Organizations ==
- Catalan Mathematical Society (Catalan: Societat Catalana de Matemàtiques)
- Colombian Mathematical Society (Spanish: Sociedad Colombiana de Matemáticas)
- SCM Corporation, an American typewriter and calculator manufacturer
- SCM Holdings, a holding company owned by Ukrainian tycoon Rinat Akhmetov
- SCM Microsystems, a former name of Identiv, a technology company
- SCM Press, a UK-based academic publisher of theology
- Securities Commission Malaysia, Malaysian statutory body
- Student Christian Movement of the United Kingdom
- Student Christian Movement (disambiguation), members of the World Student Christian Federation
- Surya Citra Media, a media company in Indonesia

== Science and technology ==
- Structural Causal Model, a graphical modelling used for Causal Inference in Machine Learning and Statistics, a Causal Model.
- Scanning capacitance microscopy, a mode of scanning probe microscopy
- Schwarz, Corradi, Melnick, an astronomical catalogue
- Standard cubic meter, a unit of natural gas measurement
- Sternocleidomastoid muscle
- Structured Carrier Message, a component of MaxiCode
- Subcarrier multiplexing, a multiplexing method used in optical communication systems
- Master of Science (ScM)
- Strongly correlated material

=== Computing ===
- SCM (Scheme implementation), a free software Scheme implementation
- Service Control Manager, a component of Microsoft Windows operating systems
- Software configuration management
- Source control management or source code management, the management of documents, source code, or other data in a computing project

== Other uses ==
- Sociedad Contractual Minera, a type of mining company in Chile
- School of Creative Media, within City University of Hong Kong
- Set, Complete, Meteorological, a Signal Corps Radio term
- Short course meters, in swimming, a designation for competitions in 25-meter pools
- Smart Cities Mission, India
- SmartCity Malta, postal code
- Squadron Corporal Major, a warrant officer appointment in the British Household Cavalry
- Star Chinese Movies, a Chinese movies channel owned by Disney Networks Group Asia Pacific
- Supply chain management, management of flow of goods and services
- Sweetened condensed milk
