= Industrial estates in Malta =

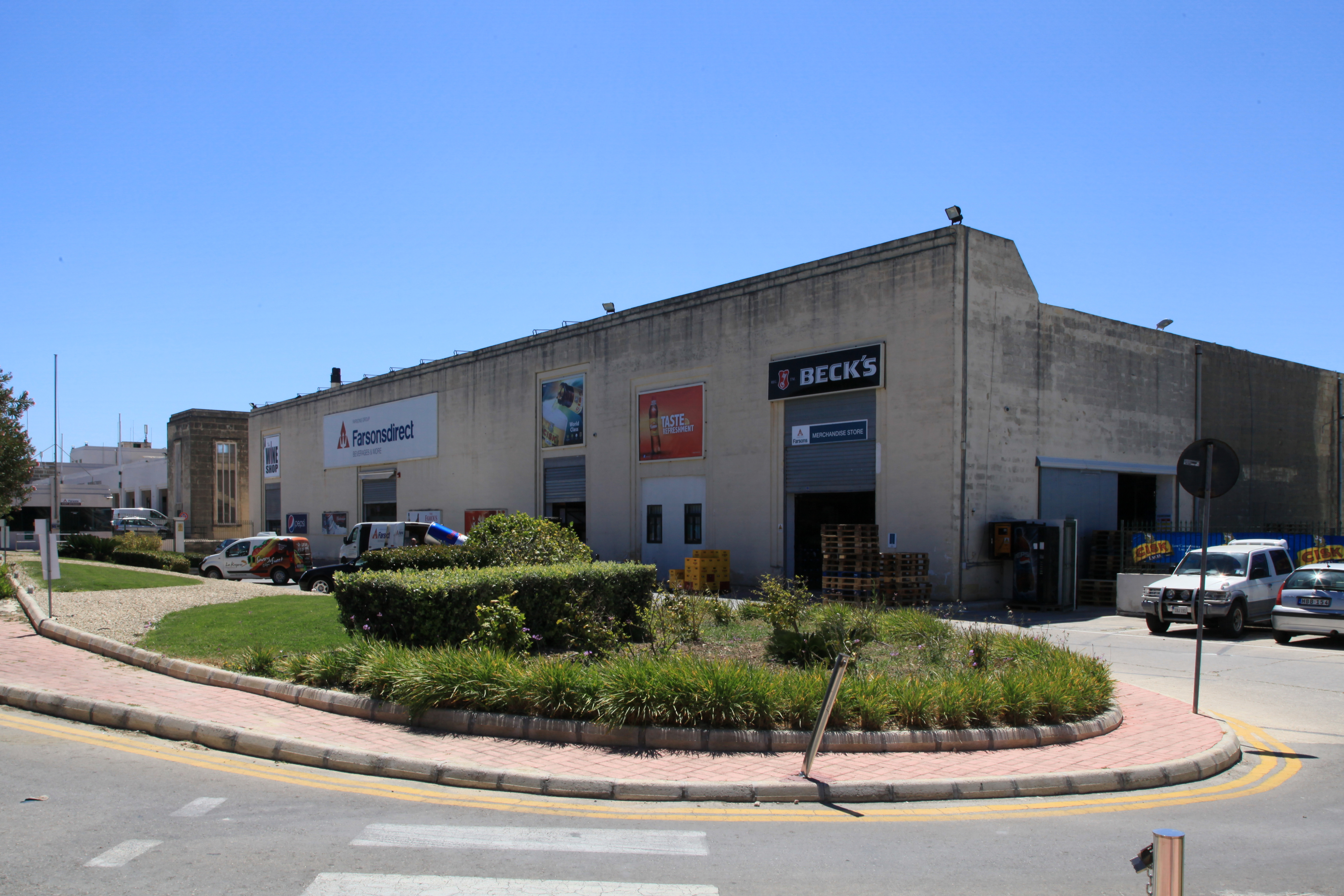
Simonds Farsons Cisk warehouse at Mrieħel Industrial Estate

Many factories in Malta are located in one of the several industrial estates throughout the archipelago. Malta Industrial Parks is a company which was created to manage industrial estates in Malta.

== Major Industrial Areas ==
The industrial estates include:

- Attard Industrial Estate near Attard
- Bulebel Industrial Estate near Żejtun
- Ħal Far Industrial Estate near Birżebbuġa
- Kordin Industrial Estate near Paola
- Luqa Industrial Estate near Luqa
- Marsa Industrial Estate near Marsa
- Ricasoli Industrial Estate near Kalkara (now defunct because of Smart City Malta)
- San Ġwann Industrial Estate near San Ġwann
- Xewkija Industrial Estate near Xewkija, Gozo

== Other Industrial Areas ==
- Mosta Industrial Estate in Mosta
- Ta' Maġġi in Żabbar
- Ta' Dbieġi in Għarb, Gozo
- Ta' Qali in Attard
- Albert Town in Marsa
- Tal-Ħandaq in Qormi
- Mrieħel near Qormi/Birkirkara

== Bulebel Industrial Estate ==
Bulebel Industrial Estate is one of the major industrial estates in Malta. Its namesake comes from milk production. Among the factories located here are:

- De La Rue, which produces physical currency for various nations.
- ACMA INOX and Metal, a metalworking company
- The Food Factory, a food production plant.

The estate is found on the outskirts of Żejtun, near the localities of Tarxien and Fgura, and is not far from Malta International Airport.
