= Thandi Ndlovu =

South African medical doctor and businesswoman (died 2019)

- Born: 1954; Soweto, South Africa
- Died: 24 August 2019 (aged 65); North West Province, South Africa
- Education: University of Fort Hare; University of Zambia
- Occupations: Physician, businesswoman
- Known for: Founder of Motheo Construction Group

Thandi Ndlovu (1954 - August 24, 2019) was a South African medical doctor and businesswoman who was best known as the founder of the Motheo Construction Group.

== Early life and education ==
Ndlovu was born in Soweto, South Africa where she attended Orlando High School.

In 1976, whilst a student at the University of Fort Hare, Ndlovu entered into exile in order to escape the attention of apartheid security services. Between 1977 and 1984, Ndlovu joined African National Congress as an Umkhonto we Sizwe member operating outside of South Africa, moving from Mozambique to Zambia, and then onto southern Angola, where she received training; afterward, she attended a school for the Young Communist League in Moscow, USSR.

Ndlovu majored in Chemistry and Biochemistry while pursuing a Bachelor of Science degree at the University of Fort Hare. She was a natural leader and was involved in many organisations from a young age.

In 1984 she enrolled at the University of Zambia to study medicine, after which she returned to South Africa and interned at Baragwanath Hospital in Soweto.

== Business career ==
Whilst practicing medicine in South Africa, Ndlovu noticed that many of the ailments among her patients from Orange Farm were related to poor living conditions due to a lack of access to adequate housing, which prompted her to found Motheo Construction in 1997. She was noted for her ability to break into the male-dominated South African construction industry, and for growing Motheo into a large-scale builder of government housing, constructing over 80,000 homes. Thandi was also one of the founders of the Students Christian Movement in Soweto.

Ndlovu held important positions, including CEO of Motheo Construction Group, and served as former president of the Black Business Council and South African Women in Construction.

== Death ==
Ndlovu died in a road vehicle incident on 24 August 2019 whilst on her way to a funeral in Rustenburg, North West Province. Thandi faced domestic violence In South African Women in Dialogue statement, Ndlovu was described as a committed feminist activist, businesswoman, military commander, and medical practitioner. Before her death, she was nominated as Businesswoman of the Year by the Businesswomen’s Association of South Africa in 2013 and graced the cover of the August 2019 edition of Forbes Africa.
