= Chibamba Kanyama =

Zambian diplomat (born 1965)

Ambassador Chibamba Kanyama
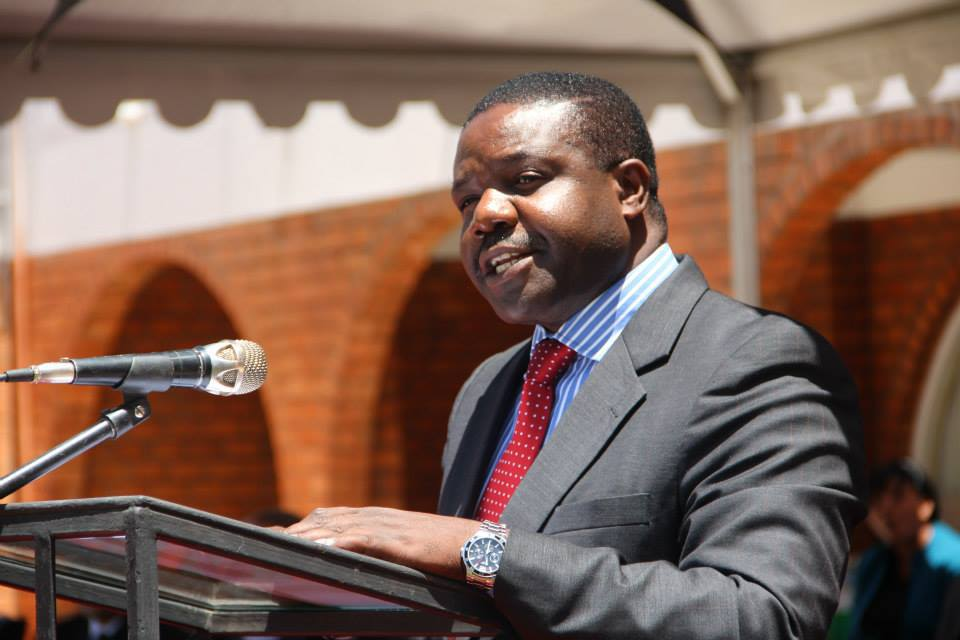
- Kanyama in 2013

Ambassador of Zambia to the United States
- In office March 2023 – Present

Director General at ZNBC
- In office March 2012 – May 2014
- Preceded by: Joe Chilaizya

Personal details
- Born: Chibamba Favour Kanyama; 26 January 1965 (age 61) Chikankata District, Zambia
- Spouse: Eneless
- Children: 4
- Education: University of Zambia; University of Reading
- Profession: Media executive, economist, diplomat

Chibamba Favour Kanyama (born 26 January 1965) is a Zambian media executive, economist and diplomat. Since March 2023, he has served as the Ambassador of Zambia to the United States of America. He is also accredited on a non-residential basis to ten other countries. Prior to his appointment, Chibamba served as the founding CEO at Bridges Limited, a Zambian consultancy firm, since 2016. He served as Director General at Zambia National Broadcasting Corporation (ZNBC) from 2012 to 2014. Subsequently, Chibamba was appointed as Communications Advisor at International Monetary Fund, based in Washington DC, U.S until 2016.

== Early life and education ==
Chibamba was born on 26 January 1965, in Chikankata District. He attended Chikankata Mission school for his secondary education. He then studied at the University of Zambia from 1985 to 1989, where he received a BA in mass communication (with economics). Chibamba later received a MSc Development Finance from the University of Reading in 2001 on a Chevening Scholarship. Since 2023, he holds a PhD in Management from Texila American University in collaboration with Central University of Nicaragua (awarding university).

== Career ==
Chibamba began working at Zambia National Broadcasting Corporation (ZNBC) in 1989, he started as manager and he rose to the position of Executive Producer, he served in institution until 1996. Subsequently, he served as Director at CK Media Agency until 1998. In 1999, Chibamba joined Zambia Institute of Mass Communication (ZAMCOM), a Zambian government media training institution, until 2002 he was the broadcasting manager at the institution. In addition, between 1999 and 2007, Chibamba served as a consultant for the Nordic-SADC Journalism Centre, responsible for economic and business reporting trainings.

Since 2002, Chibamba consecutively held positions of director responsible for corporate affairs at Zambia State Insurance Corporation (ZSIC) until 2008, and at Zambian Breweries until 2012. In March 2012, Chibamba returned at Zambia National Broadcasting Corporation (ZNBC), where he was appointed as Director General replacing Joe Chilaizya. He served until 2014, when he took up an appointment by the International Monetary Fund as communications advisor, based in Washington DC, U.S he served until 2016. Since 2016, Chibamba held a position of Managing Consultant at Bridges Limited, a Zambian consultancy firm specializing in leadership and coaching advisory, Business Management Advisory, Corporate Communications Services and Stakeholder Management Advisory services.

== Diplomatic mission ==
In 2011, he was appointed as a UNICEF's Ambassador for the 'Brothers for Life Campaign' focusing on youth behaviors related to alcohol and substance abuse, violence, sexual obstinance and health living.

Chibamba was appointed Zambia’s 18th Ambassador to the United States in late 2022 after consultations with State House and the Ministry of Foreign Affairs conducted between May and October 2022 and approved by Zambian President Hakainde Hichilema. He is accredited on a non-residential basis to Belize, Costa Rica, El Salvador, Guatemala, Haiti, Honduras, Jamaica, Mexico, Nicaragua, and Panama, Chibamba took over from Lazarous Kapambwe who had served since January 2020.

Following his assumption of office in 2023, Chibamba oversaw the development of the Zambia Embassy Strategic Plan (2024–2026). The plan was finalized through consultations with U.S. government institutions, private-sector stakeholders, and members of the Zambian diaspora, and aligned with Zambia’s Eighth National Development Plan (2022–2026).

Since his appointment, the embassy facilitated exploratory engagements with U.S.-based companies and coordinated with the Zambia Development Agency on investor outreach. In 2025, the embassy planned multi-state investment engagements in California, Texas, and Georgia as part of efforts to expand Zambia’s investment profile in the United States.

Chibamba’s tenure has also emphasized structured engagement with the Zambian diaspora and the management of bilateral issues affecting Zambian nationals in the United States. From 2023 onward, the embassy promoted diaspora participation in investment initiatives and expanded consular outreach through the appointment of honorary consuls in California, Texas, Massachusetts, and Georgia between 2024 and 2025. During discussions on sensitive bilateral matters, including U.S. aid adjustments and visa policy changes in 2025, he maintained that sustained diplomatic engagement between Zambia and the United States remained essential.

== Other considerations ==
Chibamba was among three Zambians appointed Climate Change Ambassadors by the British Council in 2010. In 2008, Chibamba initiated "Creating the Future", the first ever business conference for teenagers in Zambia. An average 4,500 young people attended the two conferences. He mobilized over US$40,000 for each period from the business community and international donor organizations such as the European Union. The initiative has since been registered as a trust, named Teen Vision Trust Zambia.

== Controversies ==
In July 2018, Chibamba tweeted that the IMF was 'withdrawing its resident representative to Zambia, Alfredo Baldini, something that had not happened except for two African countries and that a replacement would take a while'. This generated a lot of condemnation by members of the ruling Patriotic Front (PF), who published articles on both social and mainstream media, claiming Chibamba had lied. The President of the Economic Association of Zambia, who was aligned to the ruling party, Lubinda Haabazoka issued a social media statement disowning Chibamba and stating that he was not an economist.

Chibamba later apologized for the tweet through the Times of Zambia and Zambia Daily Mail after the Minister of Finance Margaret Mwanakatwe engaged him so as to calm the situation. The IMF resident representative, Baldini, still left Zambia the same month and the country had to do without an IMF resident representative for four years. The issue of Chibamba not being an economist re-emerged a few years later following another statement in which he supported an IMF programme for Zambia under the new regime of the United Party for National Development (UPND). The Minister of Finance and National Planning Dr. Situmbeko Musokotwane quickly issued a statement claiming Chibamba was his student in economics at the University of Zambia. Chibamba also responded via social media to clarify his academic credentials.

== Personal life ==
Chibamba is married to Eneless and has four children.

== Books ==
- "Business Values for Our Time", Bridges Communications, 2010.
- "Achievement Values for Young Adults", Bridges Communication, 2011.
- "Determinants of FDI in Sub-Saharan Africa", Lambert Academic Publishing, 2012.
