= Villa Bighi =

Royal Naval Hospital Bighi
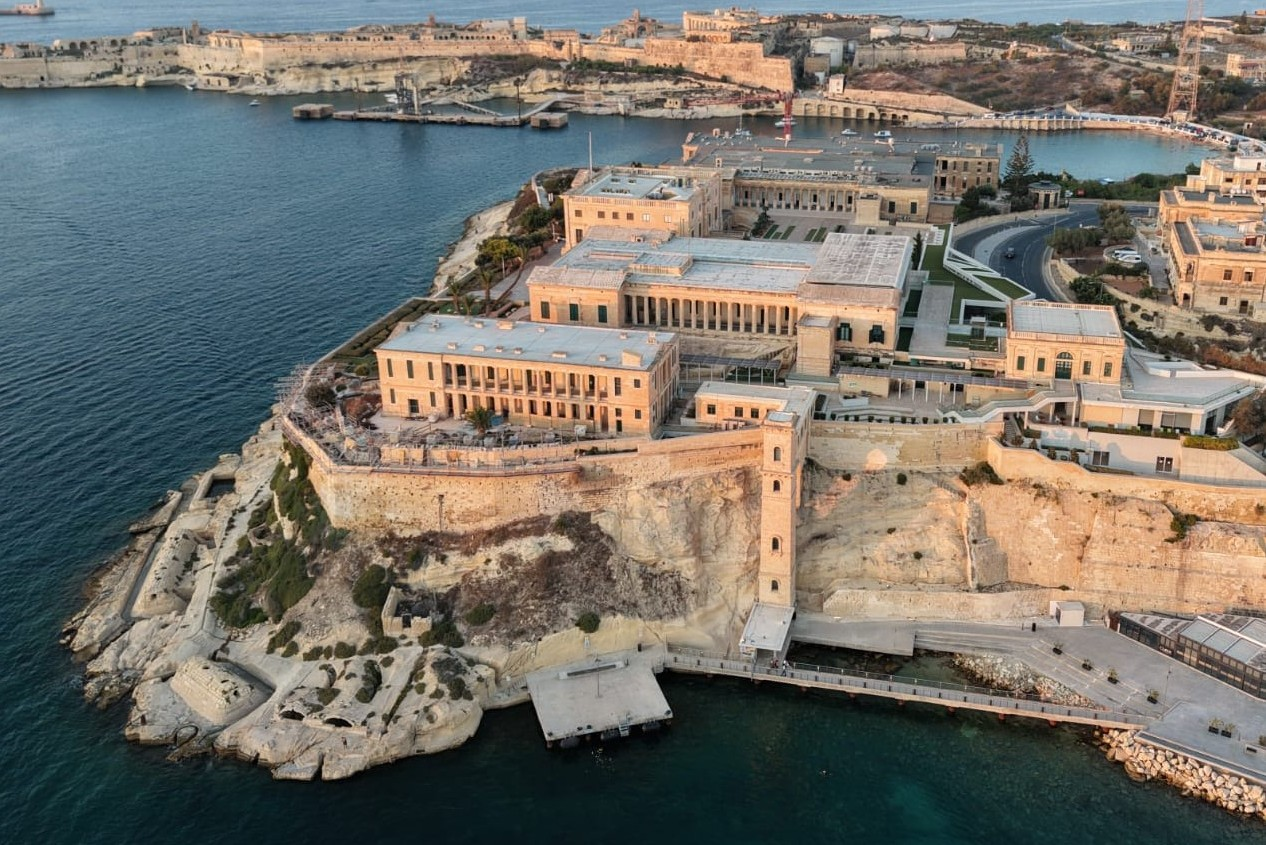
- Bighi Hospital, 2026

- Location within Malta

Geography
- Location: Kalkara, Malta
- Coordinates: 35°53′35.1″N 14°31′28.2″E

Organisation
- Type: Military

Services
- Beds: 250

History
- Founded: 29 September 1830
- Closed: 17 September 1970

Links
- Lists: Hospitals in Malta

Royal Naval Hospital Bighi (RNH Bighi) also known as Bighi Hospital, was a major naval hospital located in the small town of Kalkara on the island of Malta. It was built on the site of the gardens of Palazzo Bichi, that was periodically known as Palazzo Salvatore. RNH Bighi served the eastern Mediterranean in the 19th and 20th centuries and, in conjunction with the RN Hospital at Mtarfa, contributed to the nursing and medical care of casualties whenever hostilities occurred in the Mediterranean. The building is now known as Villa Bighi and it houses a restoration unit.

== History ==
=== Palazzo Bichi ===
On the site of the current building is Palazzo Bichi (now Palazzo Bighi) also known as Villa Bichi, built in 1675 during the Order of St. John by Fra Giovanni Bichi on the designs of Lorenzo Gafa. Fra Giovanni Bichi was the nephew of Pope Alexander VII. The palace passed to his nephew Fra Mario Bichi, a member of the Order, even before it was finished as Fra Giovanni Bichi had died. He sold it to Bailiff Fra Giovanni Sigismondo, who was the Count of Schaesberg, in 1712. It was then known as Palazzo Salvatore and Gardens because of the hill being named Salvatore Hill.

The palace became known again as Palazzo Bichi after it was bought by another Fra Giovanni Bichi in 1712 and remained his until his death in 1740. The palace is said to have housed Napoleon Bonaparte in 1798 before his entry in Valletta but this is disputed. The building was used for quarantine for high officials during the rule of the Order of St John, such as by the Inquisitor Monsignor Paolo Passionei.

Since the arrival of the British military in Malta it started to be known (since 1799) as Villa Bighi particularly because of the references to it by Sir Alexander Ball. Most palaces in Malta built by the Order started to be referred to as Villas by the British, and particularly the word Bichi of Villa Bichi was corrupted to Villa Bighi. Even before his arrival, the site was chosen by Nelson to build a naval hospital since 1803.

The palace, or villa, and its garden become a public building of the Civil Government during the British Protectorate but was left to dilapidate. The building served as a cholera epidemic hospital in 1813-4. It was only with the intervention of King George IV in 1827 when it was granted permission to develop the site of the gardens, and turn them in the present Bighi Hospital. This happened on the request of the Maltese governor Frederick Ponsonby. The original villa, Villa Bichi, is today housing an educational center known as Esplora as well as the offices of the government entity Xjenza Malta. Palazzo Bichi is scheduled as a Grade 1 national monument by the Planning Authority.

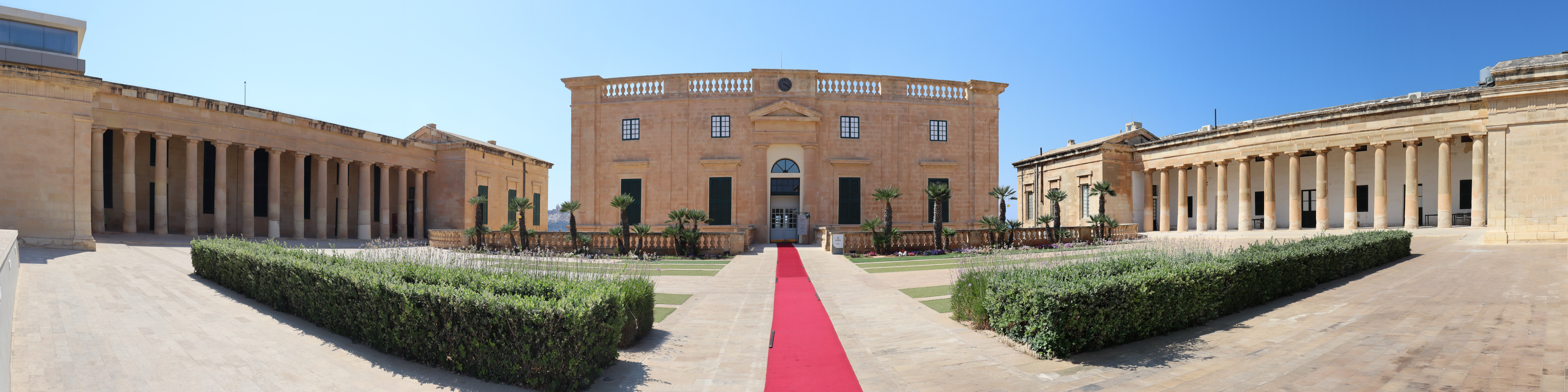
A panorama of Villa Bighi shot near the entrance in 2026

=== Villa Bighi ===
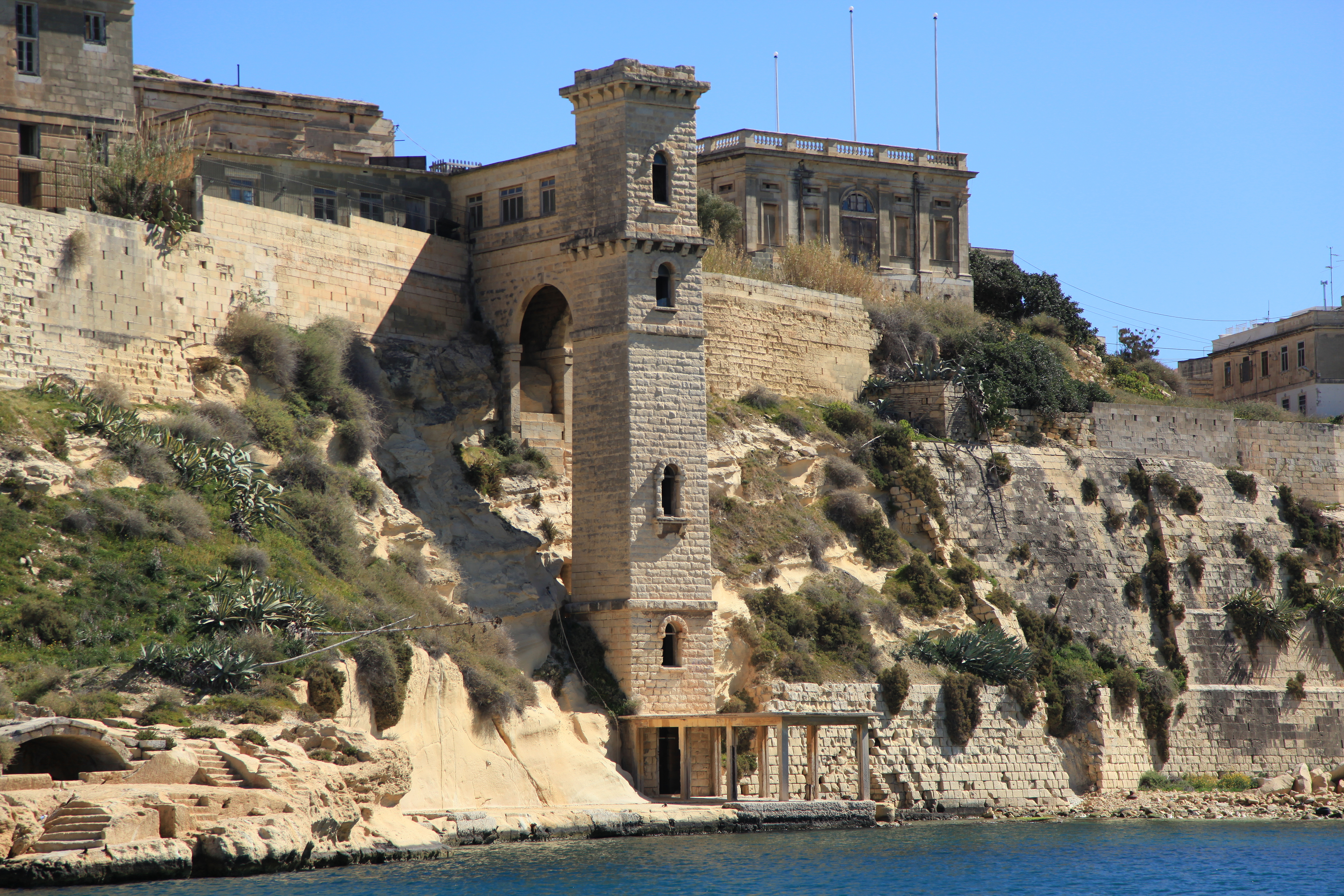
The Cot Lift at Bighi hospital in the middle.

In 1829 four Egyptian limestone stelae, that pre-date the Phoenician period in Malta, were found on the site by British archaeologists. Phoenician remains bearing inscriptions were also found that are now displayed at the British Museum. On the request of the British Royal Navy to the Governor the site was handed over in 1830 to build the Royal Navy Bighi Hospital. The building was designed by the eldest son of Saverio Scerri. The building cost roughly £20,000 and started operating in 1832. It accommodated 200 beds and it roughly gave service to 800 navy sailors per year. The design of Bighi Hospital is generally attributed to Colonel (later Major General) Sir George Whitmore (1775–1862) who headed the Royal Engineers between 1811 and 1829. The foundation stone was laid by Vice Admiral Sir Pulteney Malcolm on 23 March 1830. The works were completed on 24 September 1832, at a total cost of £20,000. The West and East Wings' architecture is in the modern Doric style and built with high floors. The hospital has three separate building and are known as Villa Bighi. It should not be confused with Villa Bichi, built in 1675. The Surgical (also known as the General Hospital Block) and the Zymotic Blocks were built in 1901 and 1903 respectively.

== Service ==
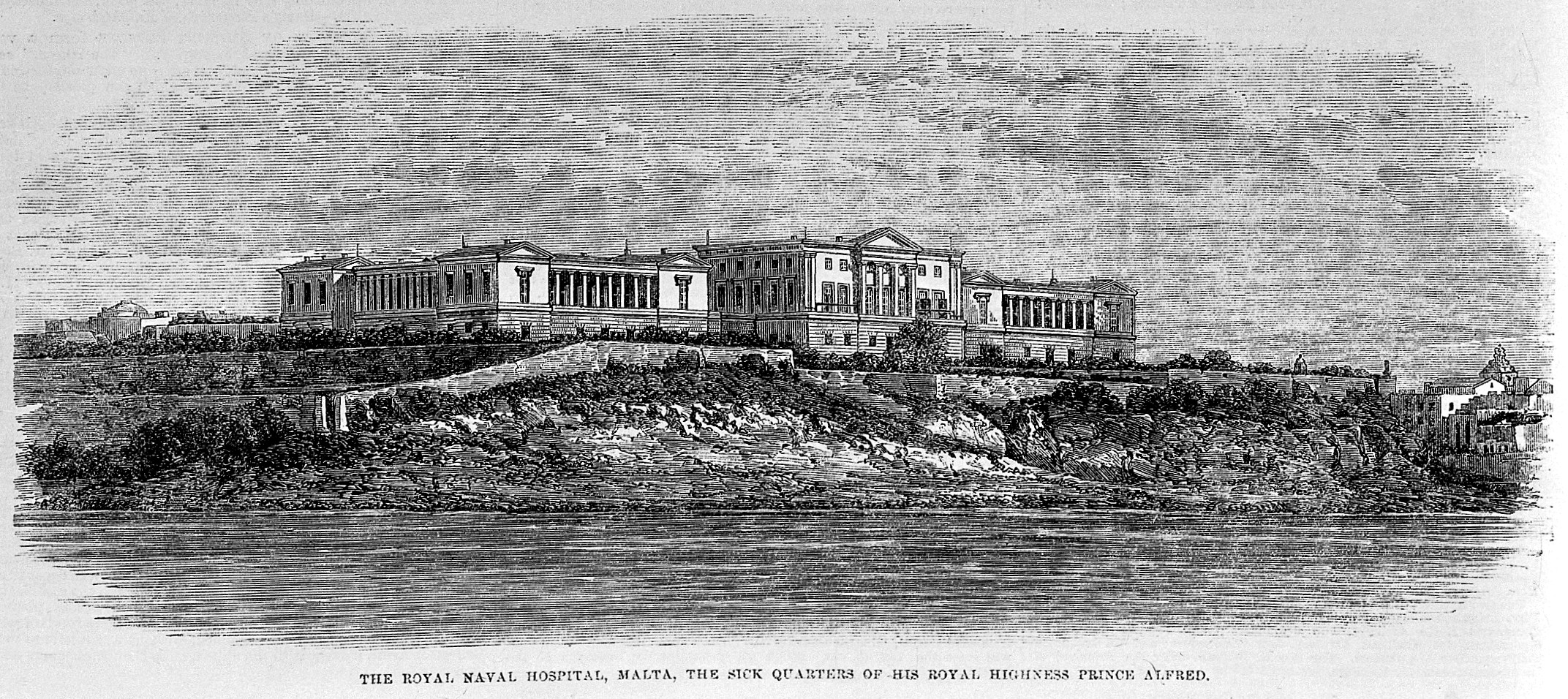
The Illustrated London News' depiction of Bighi Hospital in 1863

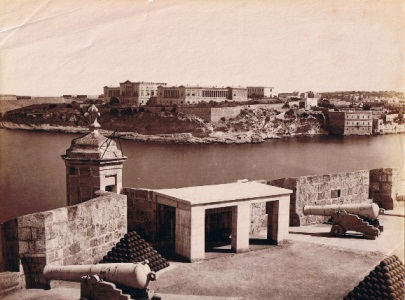
Bighi Hospital in 1875

Bighi Hospital in the 1960s

Bighi Hospital contributed to the nursing and medical care of casualties whenever hostilities occurred in the Mediterranean, making Malta "the nurse of the Mediterranean".

The hospital's first director (1827–1844) was John Liddell. He was later appointed director-general of the Royal Navy's Medical Department, and during his office Bighi nursed casualties from the Crimean War.

In 1863 the hospital looked after Queen Victoria's son Prince Alfred who was ill for a month with typhoid fever whilst serving as an officer in the RN. He recovered from his illness. The Illustrated London News of 11 April 1863 included a detailed description of how the prince was quartered and the layout of the hospital.

During the First World War, RNH Bighi accommodated a very large number of casualties from the Daradanelles. During the Second World War, the Hospital was well within the target area of the heavy bombing since it was surrounded by military establishments. A number of its buildings were damaged or destroyed, including the x-ray theatre, the East and West Wings, the Villa and the Cot Lift from the Bighi Jetty to the Hospital. Among several doctors and nurses of renown to serve here were Doris Beale.

== Closure and subsequent site usage ==
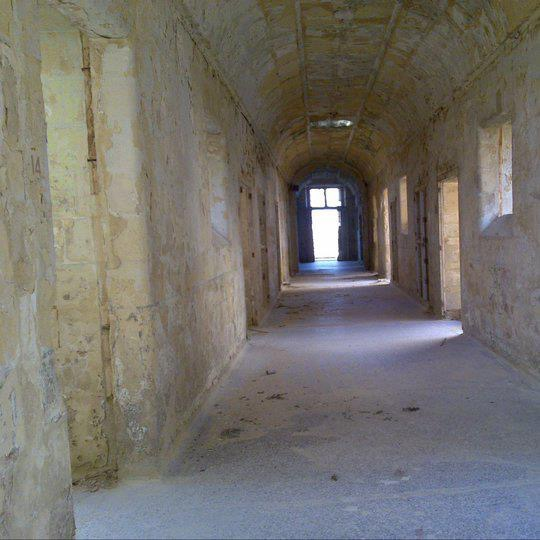
Bighi indoor, in a dilapidated state before restoration (2010)

In 1967, during the second rundown of the British services and their employees in Malta, Bighi Hospital was on the brink of closing down. On 17 September 1970 Bighi was closed down indefinitely.

In 1977 parts of the building were occupied by the former Senglea Trade School while other sections accommodated a secondary school.

Since 2010 the site has housed the head office of Heritage Malta; the national agency for museums, conservation practice and cultural heritage.

== See also ==
- List of hospitals and hospital ships of the Royal Navy
