= Kalkara =

Town and local council in southeastern Malta

Kalkara Il-Kalkara Calcara
- Local council
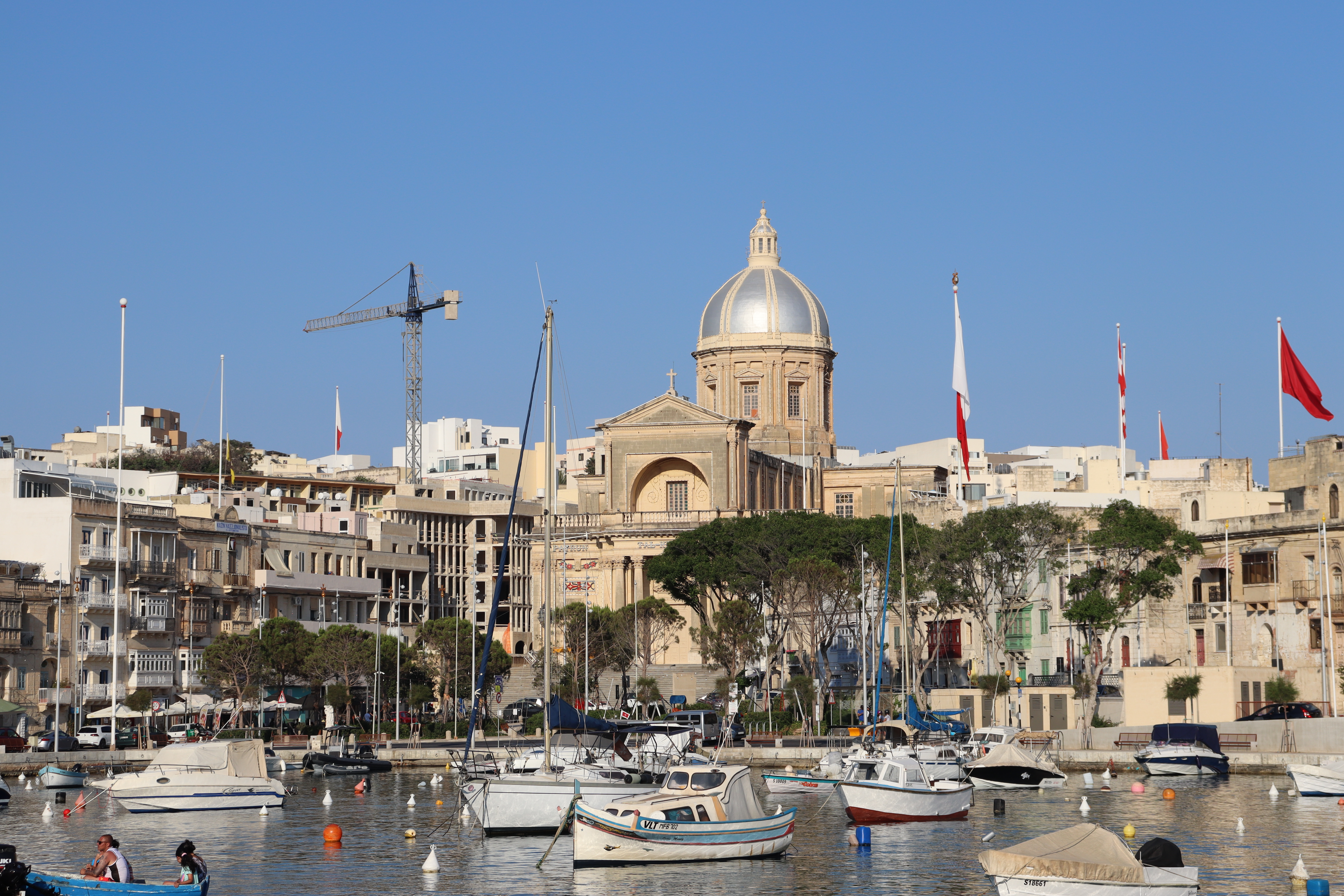
- The Kalkara village centre seen in June 2026

- Flag Coat of arms
- Motto: Mill-Ġir Ismi (From Lime is My Name)
- Coordinates: 35°53′21″N 14°31′46″E
- Country: Malta
- Region: Port Region
- District: Southern Harbour District
- Borders: Birgu, Xgħajra, Żabbar

Government
  - Mayor: Wayne Aquilina (PL)

Area
  - Total: 1.8 km^{2} (0.69 sq mi)

Population (Jul. 2024)
  - Total: 3,248
  - Density: 1,800/km^{2} (4,700/sq mi)
- Demonym(s): Kalkariż (m), Kalkariża (f), Kalkariżi (pl)
- Time zone: UTC+1 (CET)
  - Summer (DST): UTC+2 (CEST)
- Postal code: KKR
- Dialing code: 356
- ISO 3166 code: MT-21
- Patron saint: Saint Joseph
- Day of festa: Second Sunday of July
- Kalkara Day: 10 December
- Website: Official website

Kalkara (Maltese: Il-Kalkara) is a village in the Port Region of Malta, with a population of 3,014 as of March 2014. The name is derived from the Latin word for lime (calce), and it is believed that there was a lime kiln present there since Roman times. Kalkara forms part of the inner harbour area and occupies the area around Kalkara Creek. The town has its own local council and is bordered by Birgu, Żabbar, and Xgħajra.

== History ==
Kalkara budded as a small fishing community around the sheltered inlet of Kalkara Creek. Some historians believe the land today known as Kalkara was one of the first to be inhabited by the initial dwellers of Malta coming from Sicily. They argue that the Grand Harbour's inlets could have provided these emigrants shelter after their long voyage in the Mediterranean. But such a theory cannot be proven and Kalkara's early history will remain largely unknown.

Christianity presumably reached Kalkara when the Paleochristian hypogeums were built in Xagħra ta' Santa Duminka (Saint Domenica's garigue), found in the parish boundary. Here, the first Christian cults started to be performed, today attributed to the depiction of an orant inside the hypogeums.

The village's name comes from the Latin word calce meaning lime (Maltese: ġir), as lime kilns traditionally populated it; hence too its motto A Calce Nomen. Kalkara's emblem is a green scutcheon split in half: a blue part representing the sea, and a gold part with a burning flame.

When in 1530 the Knights Hospitaller came to Malta and raised their headquarters at neighbouring Birgu, they greatly developed and fortified the region. This culminated in the Cottonera Lines, a massive line of fortifications enclosing the three cities Birgu, Bormla, and Isla (together named Cottonera), and Fort Ricasoli at the mouth of the Grand Harbour. Many decades on, the corsair and Ottoman attacks once typical in Malta hushed, and this new safety allowed Kalkara to become a suburb of Cottonera, particularly, Birgu.

The population slowly increased. In the nineteenth and twentieth centuries, Kalkara developed into a small seaside resort, and its waterfront and historical centre acquired their present layout. During this time, Cottonera was a major residential, commercial, and industrial hub, owing in good part to the Drydocks, used by the British Royal Navy throughout the empire's stay in Malta. At first, dockyard workers from Cottonera built most of the houses in Kalkara houses as summer residences where they could break from their busy lifestyle. But as time passed and land in Cottonera became scarce, more people settled in Kalkara permanently. Many of these houses, built between the 1850s and the 1950s, still stand. They are locally referred to as townhouses—terraced two-floor houses adorned with a traditional Maltese timber balcony, stone slab ceilings supported by wooden or iron beams, and Maltese patterned floor tiles. Some, especially along the waterfront, are more elaborate and include three or four floors and detailed stone carvings. The growth in population earned Kalkara the status of independent parish in 1897, separate from Birgu.

Although not itself strategically important, Kalkara bore the brunt of World War II due to its nearness to Cottonera and the Drydocks. The first parish church, located close to the present parish church, was demolished during an air attack on 10 April 1942.

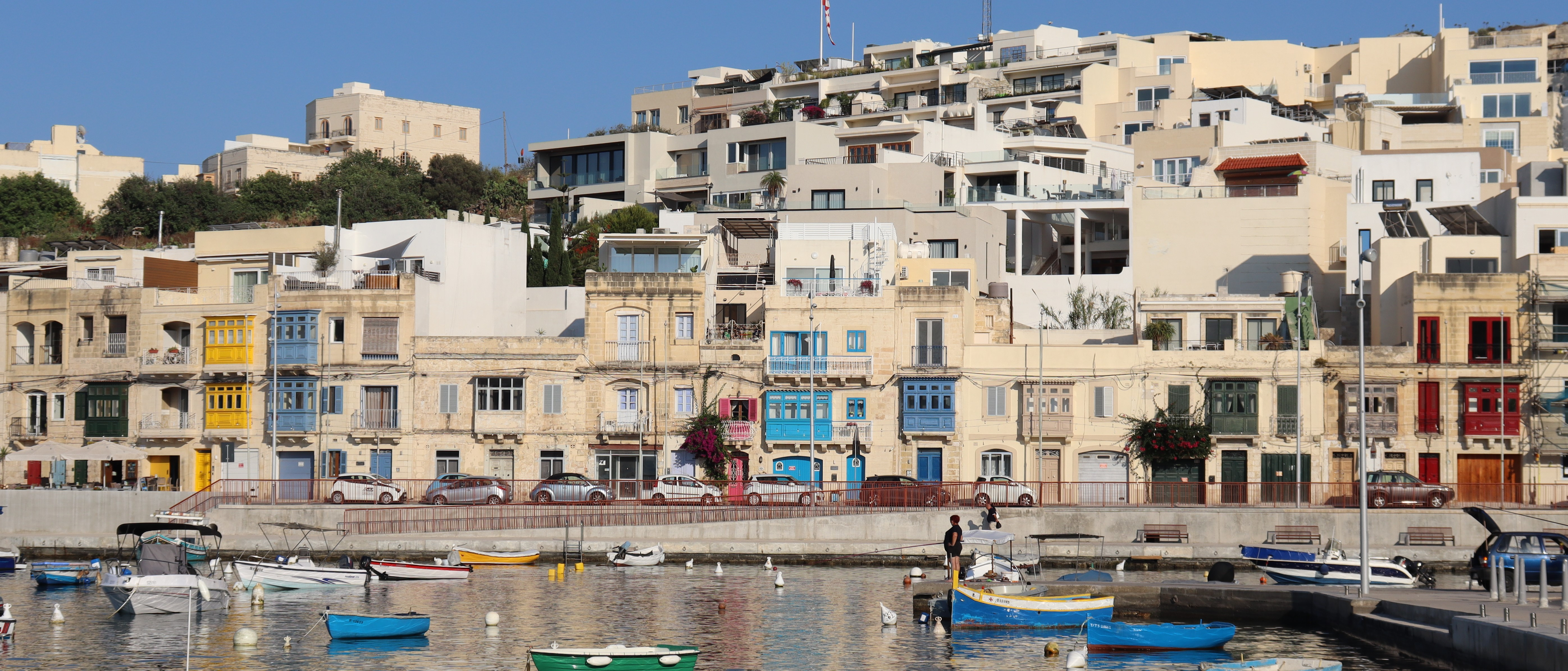
A row of traditional townhouses overlooking the creek, pictured in 2026

Following independence from Britain in 1964, Malta witnessed high development and construction, which affected Kalkara but to a lesser degree. A new housing estate was built by the government in the area close to Bighi Hospital. Further development included the construction of large terraced houses and small villas along the area flanked by Triq il-Missjoni Taljana. Kalkara remains a quiet town.

== Geography ==
Kalkara is on Malta's eastern coast and forms part of the inner harbour area of the Grand Harbour. It occupies the area around Kalkara Creek and extends to both valley sides around the creek. Rinella Bay, the only sandy beach in the Grand Harbour, is found at the mouth of the Rinella valley. Kalkara is one of the few localities within the Grand Harbour area that still has relatively large open spaces that naturally divide it from other villages. The town is bordered by the cities of Birgu and Żabbar, as well as the town of Xgħajra.

== Politics ==
The flag of Kalkara from 1993 to 2009

Since the enactment of the Local Councils Act (1993), Kalkara has been the seat of a local council responsible for matters such as the general upkeep of the locality, maintenance and construction of residential roads, and the town's environment.

The Local Council is currently made up of 5 councillors who are:

- Wayne Aquilina (Mayor) – Labour
- Vince Bongailas (Vice Mayor) – Labour
- Speranza Chircop – Labour
- Christopher Bruno – Labour
- Maria Sultana – Nationalist

== Demographics ==
The population of Kalkara was 3,248 in July 2024, of whom 1,530 were women and 1,718 men; 2,761 Maltese nationals and 487 foreign nationals. Ten years earlier, its population stood at 3,014, having risen from 2,856 in December 2009.

== Culture ==
Band Clubs

- Circolo San Giuseppe Filarmonika Sagra Familja A.D. 1897 (St. Joseph Sacred Family Philharmonic Club A.D. 1987)
- Għaqda Mużikali San Ġużepp A.D. 1987 (St. Joseph Band Club A.D. 1987)

Local NGOs

- Assoċjazzjoni Wirt il-Kalkara (Kalkara Heritage Association)

== Main sights ==
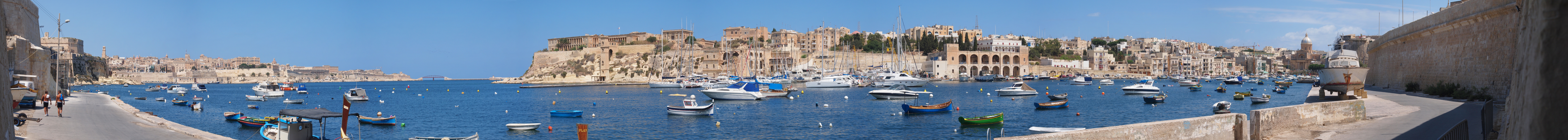
Kalkara Creek, as seen from Birgu in 2012

=== The Chapel of Our Saviour ===
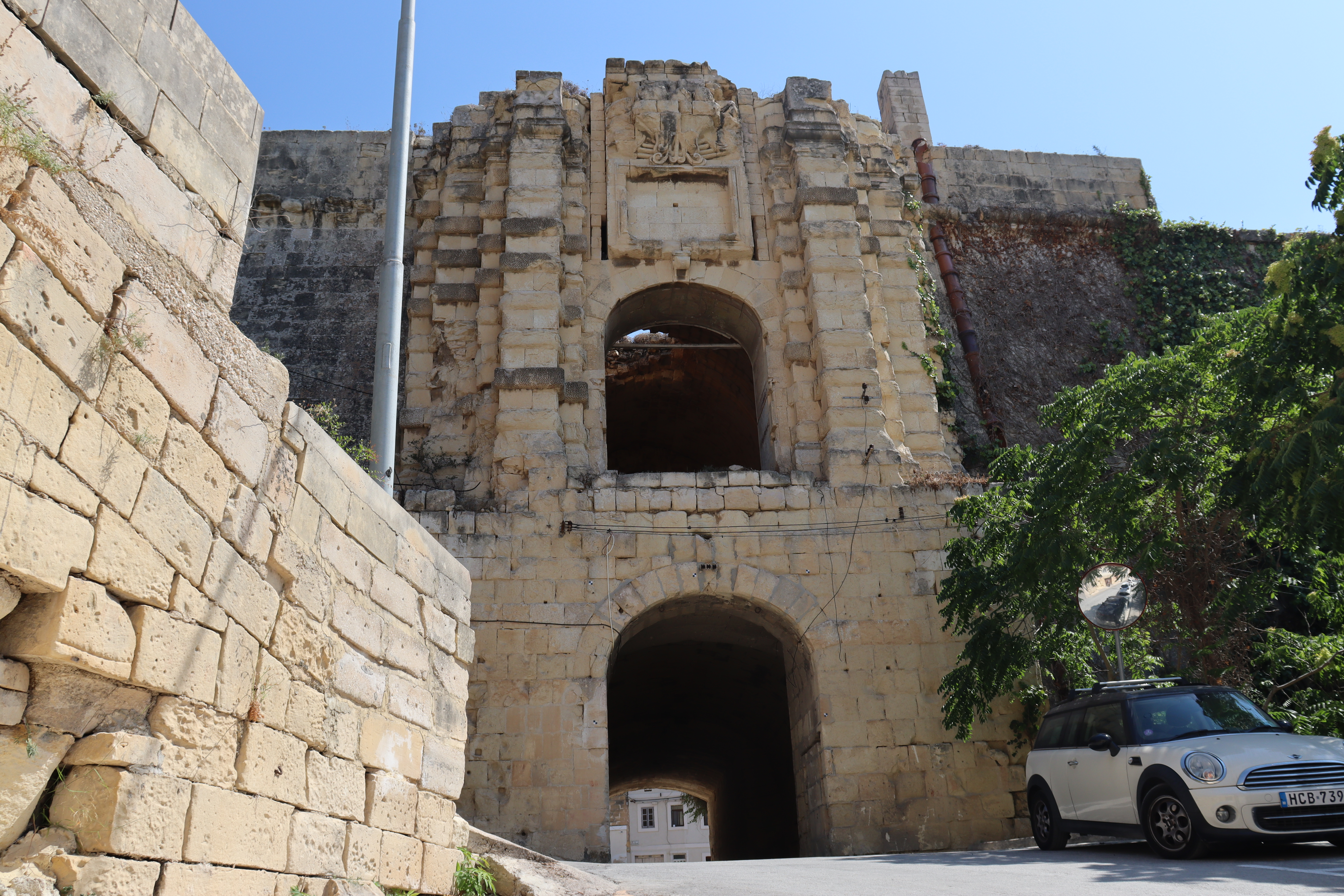
The Chapel of Our Saviour and Our Saviour's Gate right beneath it

Early historians give 1487 as the most probable date when a chapel dedicated to Jesus under the title of Our Saviour was founded in the area known as "la punta sottile della Rinella" (the thin tip of Rinella). However, from pastoral visits that were done during the time of the Knights Hospitaller, the chapel was pulled down on the orders of Grand Master Jean Parisot de la Valette during the Great Siege of 1565, to deny the invading Ottomen shelter. In 1580, Claudio Abela and Davidde Burlò received permission from the Grand Master Jean de la Cassière to build a chapel in the site where the previous chapel stood. In 1680, it was again rebuilt, this time to the design of the Maltese architect Lorenzo Gafà. The commission came from Fra Mario Bichi.

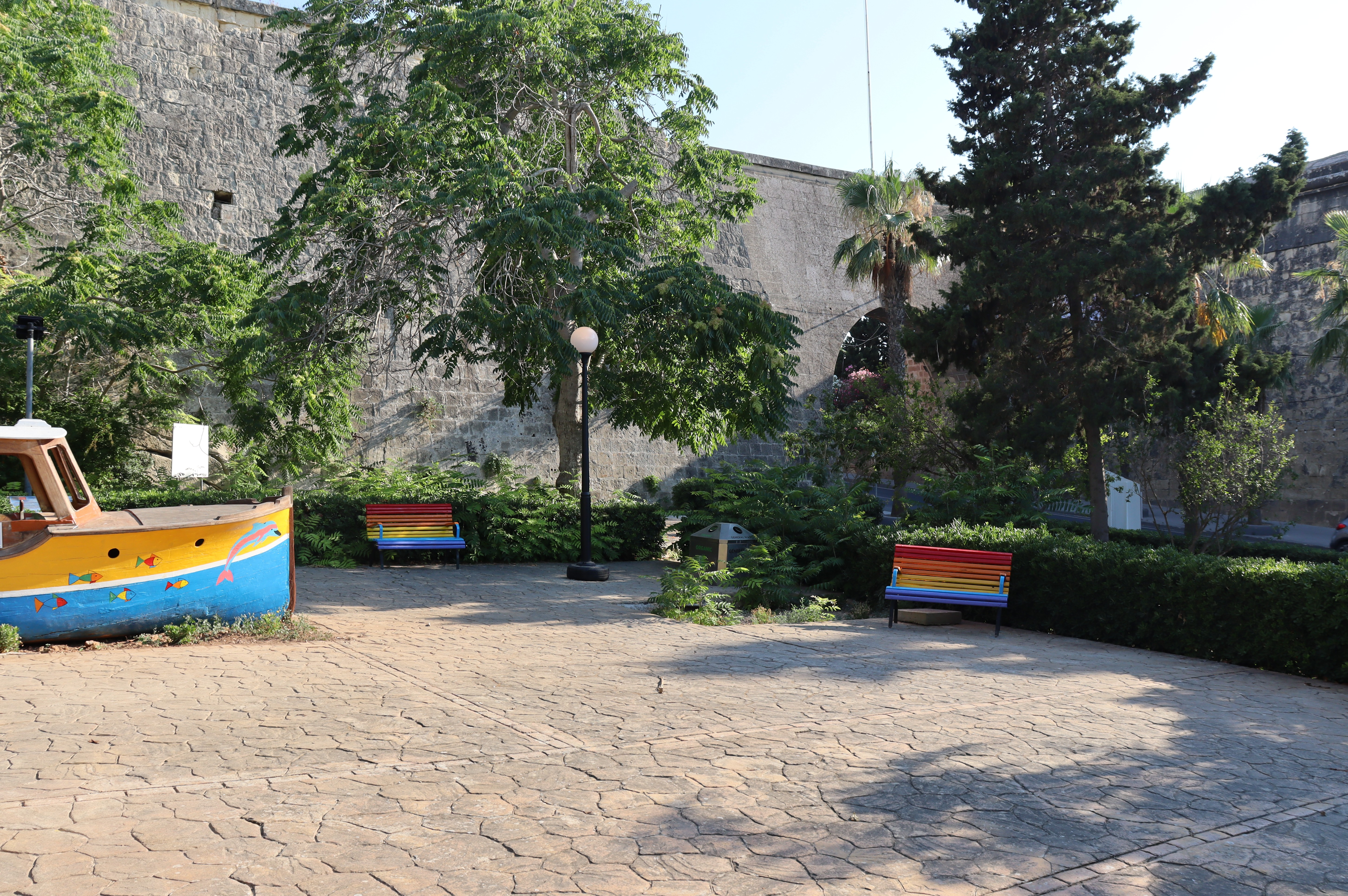
Ġnien is-Salvatur (The Garden of Our Saviour) by the main gate to the village, seen in 2026

The feast of Our Saviour was celebrated annually on 6 August. On this day and till 1811, local bread was shared out among the villagers. This chapel had large amounts of land in its possession, among which the land on which Bighi Hospital was built.

The Chapel of Our Saviour served as the Parish Church of Kalkara in the 1940s, after the first Parish Church was totally destroyed in the Second World War.

The First Parish Church

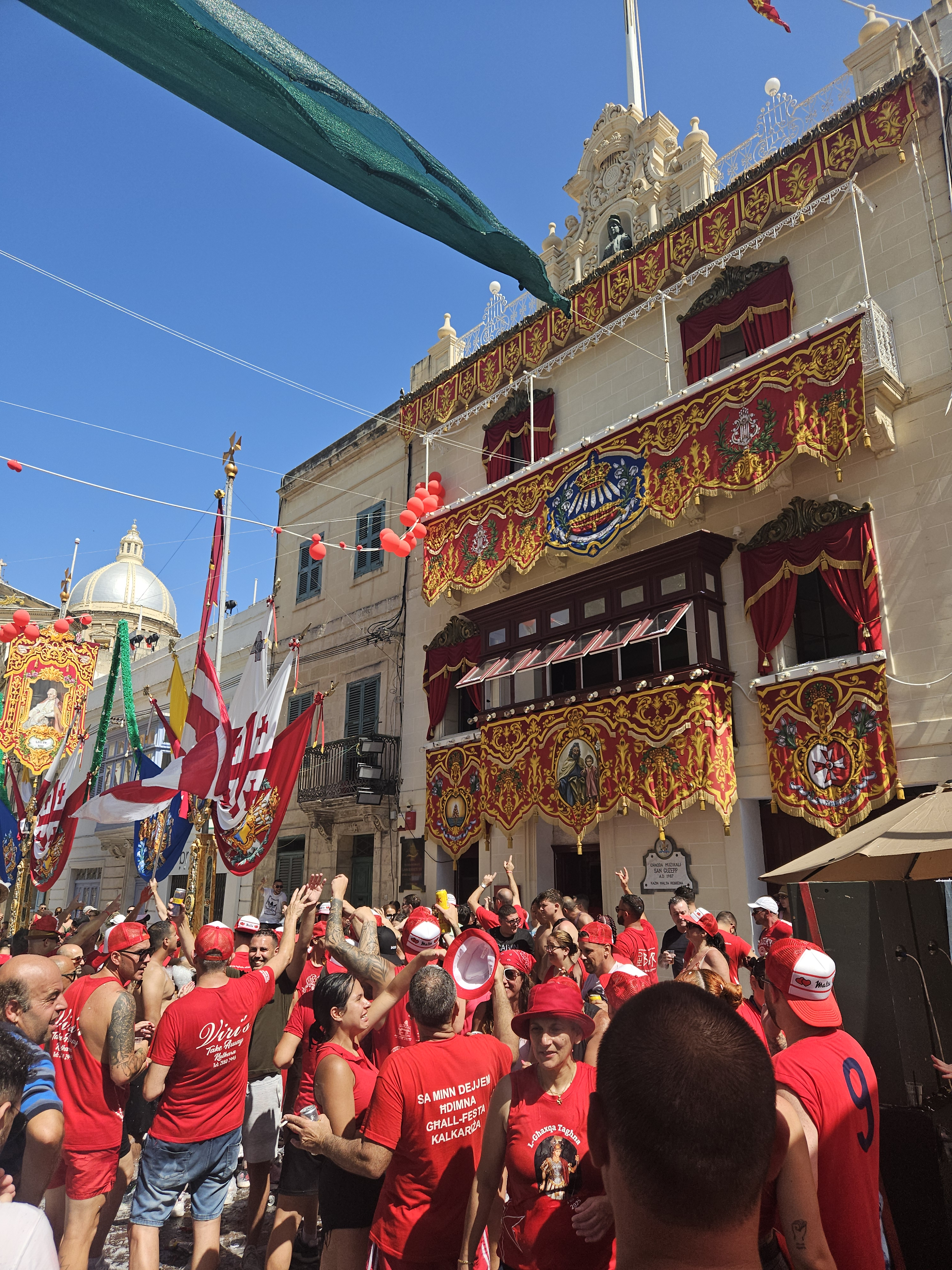
Feast of St. Joseph in Kalkara

On 23 August 1884, the businessman Fortunato Gulia donated a piece of land that he owned in Kalkara for the building of a new church. The bishop entrusted this piece of work to Fr. Joseph Azzopardi, who at that time was Rector of the Chapel of Our Saviour. Another piece of land was bought from the Chapter of Cospicua so as to be added to the one donated by Gulia, and on 13 September 1884, Fr. Azzopardi set up a committee for the building up of this Church. The committee members were: Mr. Carmelo Bugeja, Mr. Fortunato Gulia, Mr. Gio Batta Farrugia, Mr. Orazio Agius, and Mr. Paolo Debono as Secretary.

Fr. Joseph Azzopardi commissioned Guglielmo Attard as Architect of this project, and instantly donations began to be collected. It was on 22 June 1890 that the bishop solemnly blessed the first stone of the Church, during a festive atmosphere that was organised. In 1895, the construction of the Church, which was decided to be dedicated to Saint Joseph Patron of the Universal Church, had been finished, and hence in 1896 decorations in stone began to be done.

Some paintings were also commissioned, among which one may mention: the painting of Saint Philip commission by F. Cilia & Co. (the masons of the Church) to the painter Lazzaro Pisani, and the painting of Our Lady of the Rosary. A statue of Saint Joseph made by Etienne Puccini was brought by Fr. Azzopardi from Toulouse, France.

On 10 December 1897, Kalkara became an independent Parish, and from that date onwards, the Parish Church began to be enriched with other magnificent pieces of sacred art. The first Parish Priest was Fr. Joseph Ciangura of Senglea. The titular painting, commissioned to Giuseppe Calì and showing Saint Joseph as the Patron Saint of the Universal Church, was finished by 1898, and the first processional feast was done during that year. In 1899, the sacred reliquary came from Italy. In the beginning of the 20th century, the pulpit, a statue of Our Lady of the Rosary, and a girandola, among other things, emerged in the Parish Church, through the great zeal of the parishioners.

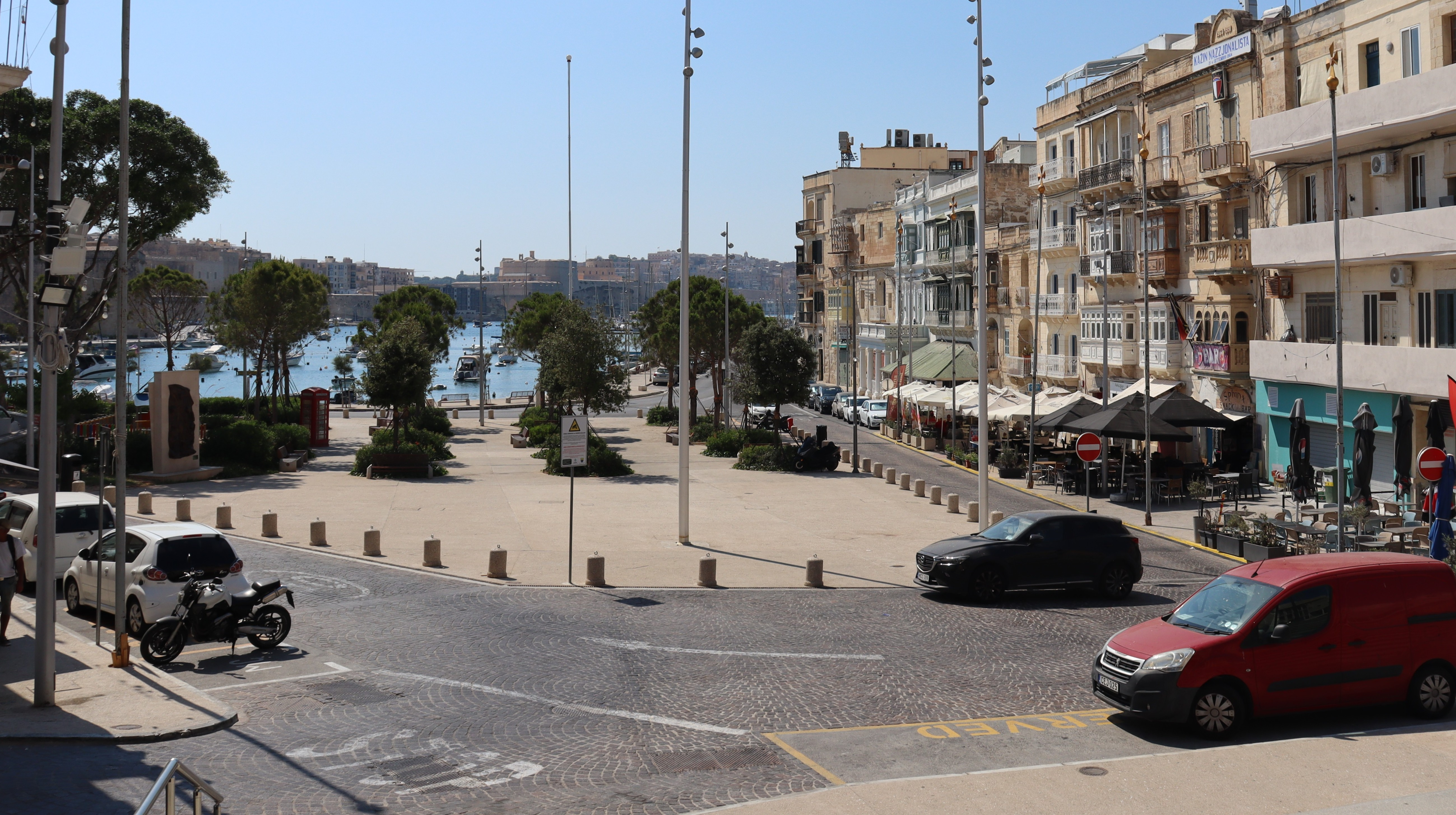
The town square seen from the parish church's parapet in June 2026; renovation works were finished in early 2024

The church was consecrated on 30 January 1921, and in 1921 Circolo San Giuseppe commissioned a new statue of Saint Joseph from Agostino Camilleri. In 1923, the first stone of the belfry was collocated, and after this was duly finished, the bell made by Julius Cauchi in 1896 sounded its first motives. In 1925, Fr. Eleazzaro Balzan became the new Parish Priest. In 1933 he commissioned a superbly designed organ balcony.

However, on 10 April 1942, the Parish Church was heavily assaulted by enemy bombardments from the air in the Second World War. Unfortunately, the Church was fully demolished through these bombardments, and tragically enough, all its treasures were lost including the titular statue, which was found in pieces. However, the destiny of the paintings was different, since these were saved by Mons. Michael Gonzi, Gozo's bishop, who had taken them to the sister island of Gozo for refuge some time before.

To commemorate where the old church once stood (in Saint Michael Street), a marble plaque was erected by Circolo San Giuseppe Filarmonika Sagra Familja.

The Present Parish Church

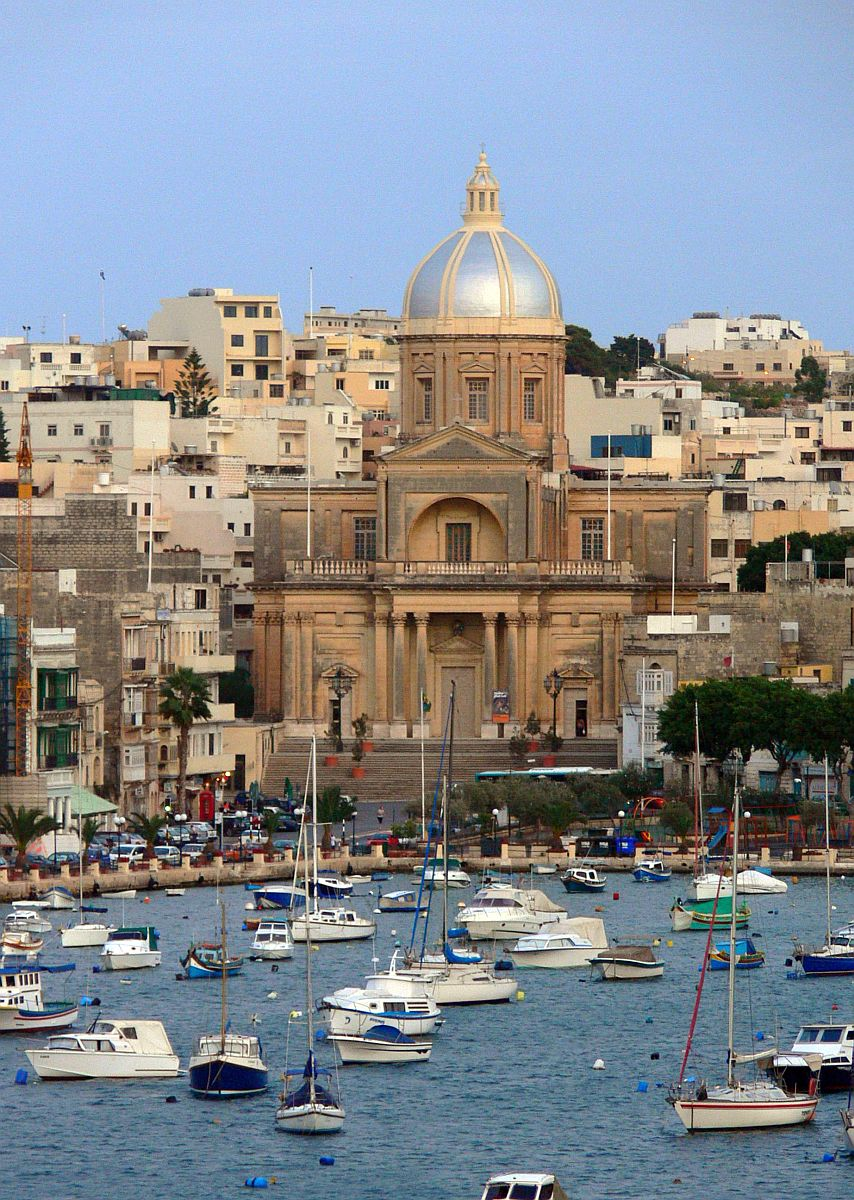
The parish church pictured in 2011

On 21 November 1943, Rev. Carmelo Xuereb was officially installed as the third Parish Priest of Kalkara. His main duty was to rebuild the Parish Church and the community of Kalkara after these were destroyed through World War II. In 1944 a temporary church was inaugurated in the ex-Malta Gas Works stores. During this period, a new design for the new Parish Church was approved. This was made by Vincenzo Bonello with the help of Ġużè Damato. Having a neoclassical design, the new Parish Church was to be built in another place from where it previously stood.

The first stone of the new church was blessed on 13 October 1946 and it took nearly six years to be fully built up. All the residents of Kalkara gave a helping hand in this project, even women and children. The building is a masterpiece in sculpture in Maltese globigerina limestone. Meanwhile, on 13 March 1949, the new titular statue representing Saint Joseph as Patron of the Universal Church arrived in Kalkara through a pilgrimage from nearby Cospicua. This statue is also a masterpiece in wood and was sculptured by the renowned artist Ferdinando Stuflesser in Bolzano, Italy through a design of Vincenzo Bonello. With this statue, another one representing Our Lady of Lourdes was also commissioned.

The new church was duly finished by 7 September 1952 when it was blessed by Gonzi. The same Archbishop celebrated the first mass in it few moments after the blessing. However, after 1952, the new Parish Church began to be decorated by other works of art. In 1953 Mr. Loreto Mintoff donated a fine marble high-altar for the church from Pietrasanta in Italy. Other works of art such as the marble pulpit, the marble pavement of the church, the Via Sacra, among others were duly blessed in future years. The new Parish Church was consecrated on 12 December 1954. In future years further works of art have been made to decorate "one of the most splendid churches built after World War II".

=== Kalkara Cross ===
A cross made out of stone stands out in Rnella Street Kalkara. The cross commemorates the event marking the end of the Great Siege of 1565, when the Ottoman Empire at war with the Knights, lost their posts from where they attacked Birgu.

Legend has it that the Knights together with the Maltese and one of their commanders went to Kalkara to see the Muslims leave Malta and the commander grabbed his sword, put it in the ground where it took on the form of a Cross and fell to his knees whereupon he thanked God that this land had once again became Christian land under the rule of knights.

Later to commemorate this event, a cross was built but was destroyed in the Second World War; only some old photographs remain. The Chapel of the Redeemer was demolished by the Knights to prevent the Ottomans to hide behind it and later rebuilt after the siege, this cross was erected to commemorate this event.

The reconstruction of the Kalkara cross was inaugurated in September 2019 with the collaboration of the Restoration Directorate and the Kalkara Local Council.

=== Kalkara Naval Cemetery ===
The Kalkara Naval Cemetery on Triq San Leonardu contains 1,085 graves of military personnel killed in the country in World War I and World War II and 1,445 burials unrelated to war. Many graves are marked by Commonwealth War Graves Commission (CWGC) gravestones. The Japanese Naval Memorial commemorates the death of Japanese submariners who were killed defending Malta in World War I.

== Notable sights ==
=== Fortifications ===
Due to its location, there are various important examples of fortifications in and around Kalkara.

==== Fort Ricasoli ====
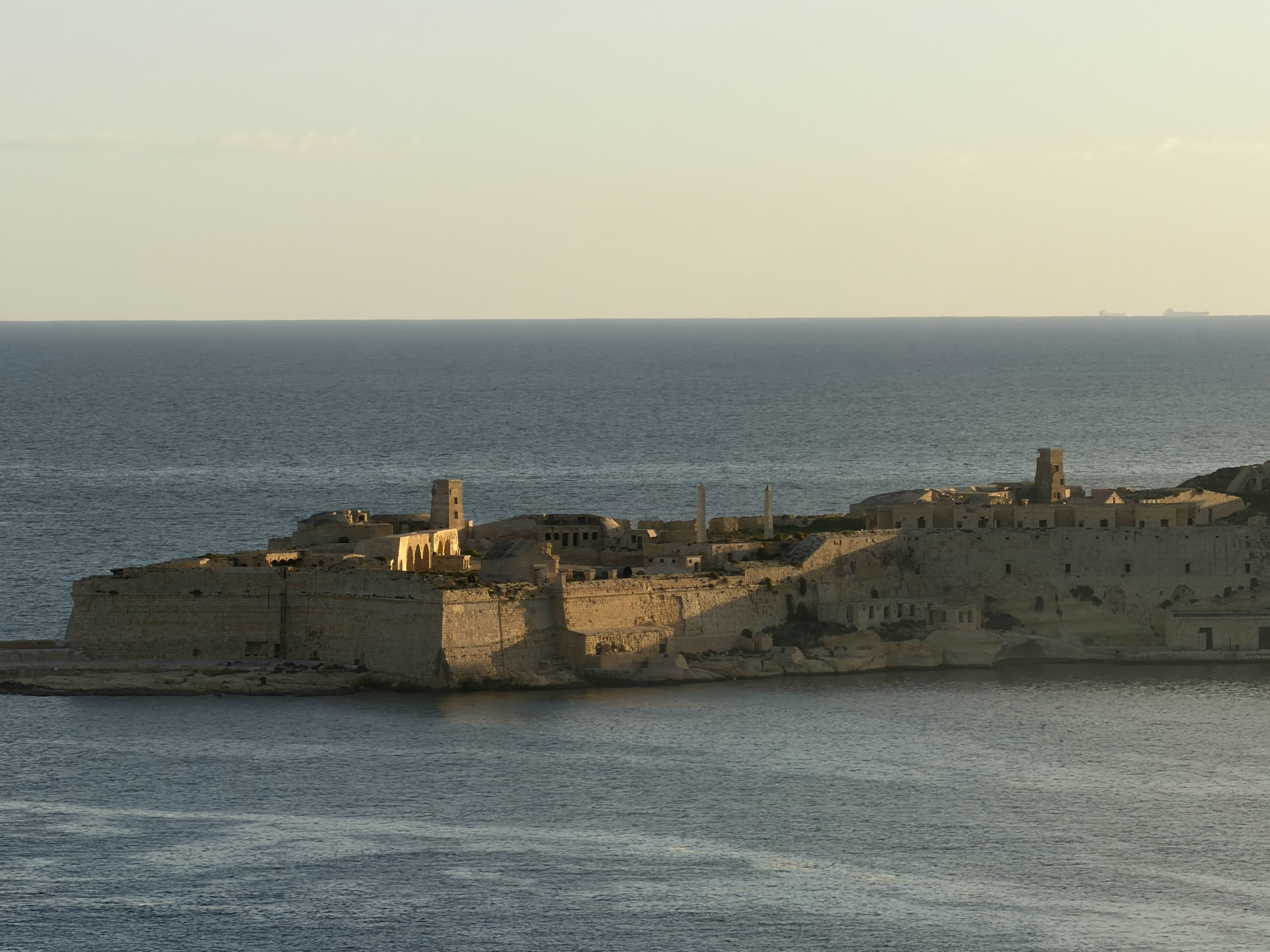
Fort Ricasoli seen from the Upper Barrakka Gardens, Valletta, in 2025

The design of Fort Ricasoli was done by Count Valperga in 1670. Previously on the same site of its erection, there was a tower known as Torri Orsi, but Grand Master Nicholas Cottoner decided that a new fort should be built on the Rinella Peninsula so as to safeguard the entrance of the Grand Harbour from the invading Ottomen. Fra Giovanni Francesco Ricasoli donated a large sum of money for its completion, and due to this after it was duly finished, the fort was given the name Ricasoli. The fort was extensively used both by the Knights of Saint John and even by the British, who also used it as a prison. In this fort there is a Chapel of St. Nicholas.

==== Rinella Battery ====
Rinella Battery was built by the British in the nineteenth century and has been restored and is administered by Fondazzjoni Wirt Artna, a local NGO. The battery is open to the public regularly and its greatest attraction is the world's largest cannon, the Armstrong 100-ton gun, which is also fired during reenactments.

=== Others ===
==== Villa Bighi ====
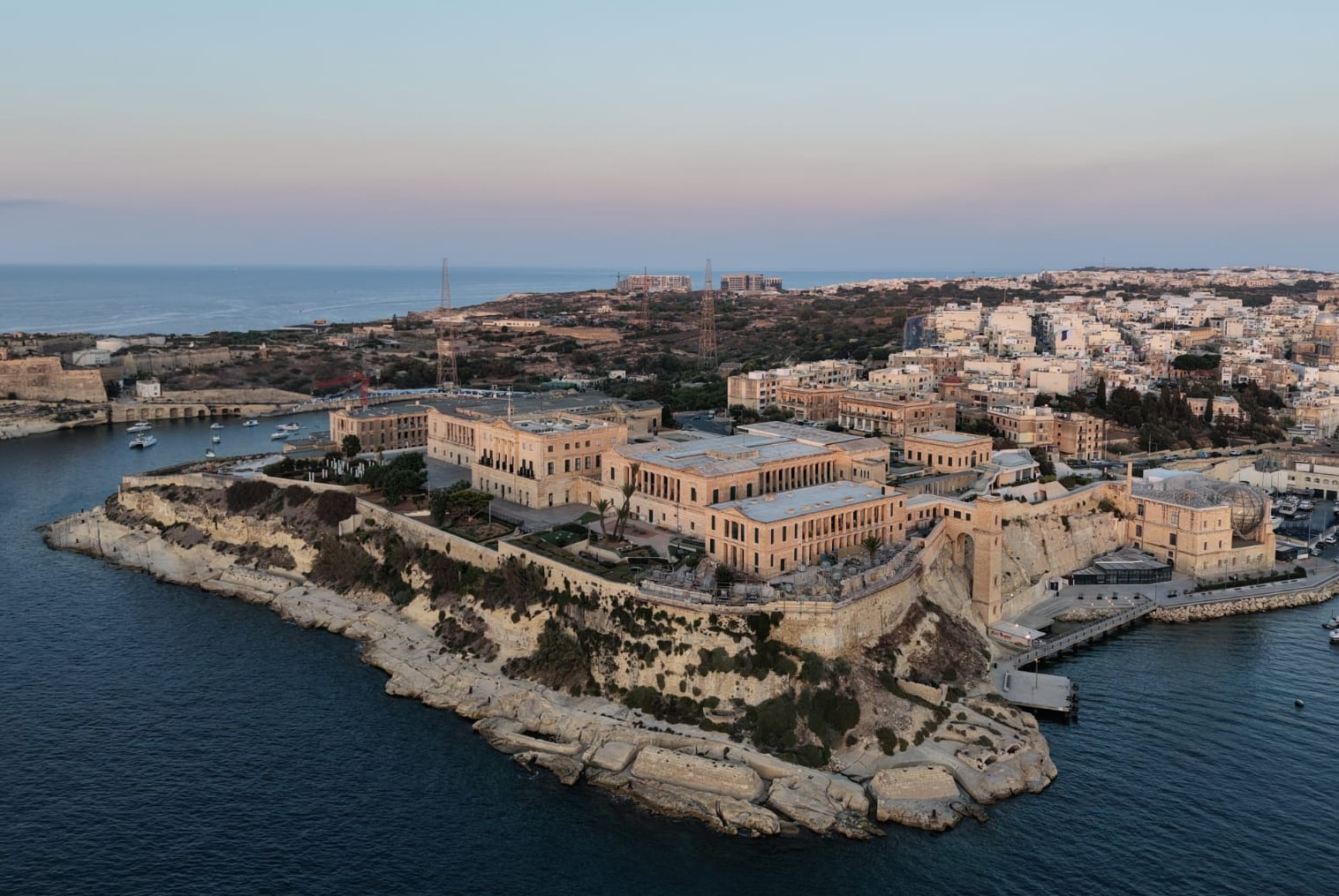
Villa Bighi and its environs as seen in 2026

In 1650, together with the Chapel of Our Saviour, Fra Giovanni Bighi erected near the same site a large villa overlooking the entrance of the Grand Harbour. During the plague of 1813, this villa was used as a temporary hospital. However, through a decree by King George IV, on 23 March 1830, Vice-Admiral Sir P. Malcolm laid down the foundation stone of a Naval Hospital on the site where Villa Bighi was situated after it was pulled down. Bighi Naval Hospital took two years to be completed and figured £20,000 of capital expenditure. During the British reign it was used extensively, and nowadays it is serving as an International School of Restoration. After an extensive restoration and modernisation Villa Bighi now hosts am Interactive Centre for Science and Innovation known as Esplora.

==== Villa Portelli ====
Overlooking Kalkara Creek there is Villa Portelli, a large villa built by Sir Agostino Portelli as a summer residence. Through World War II, this villa served as the residence of the flag officer, while in 1961 admirals began to use it as their residence.

== Economy ==
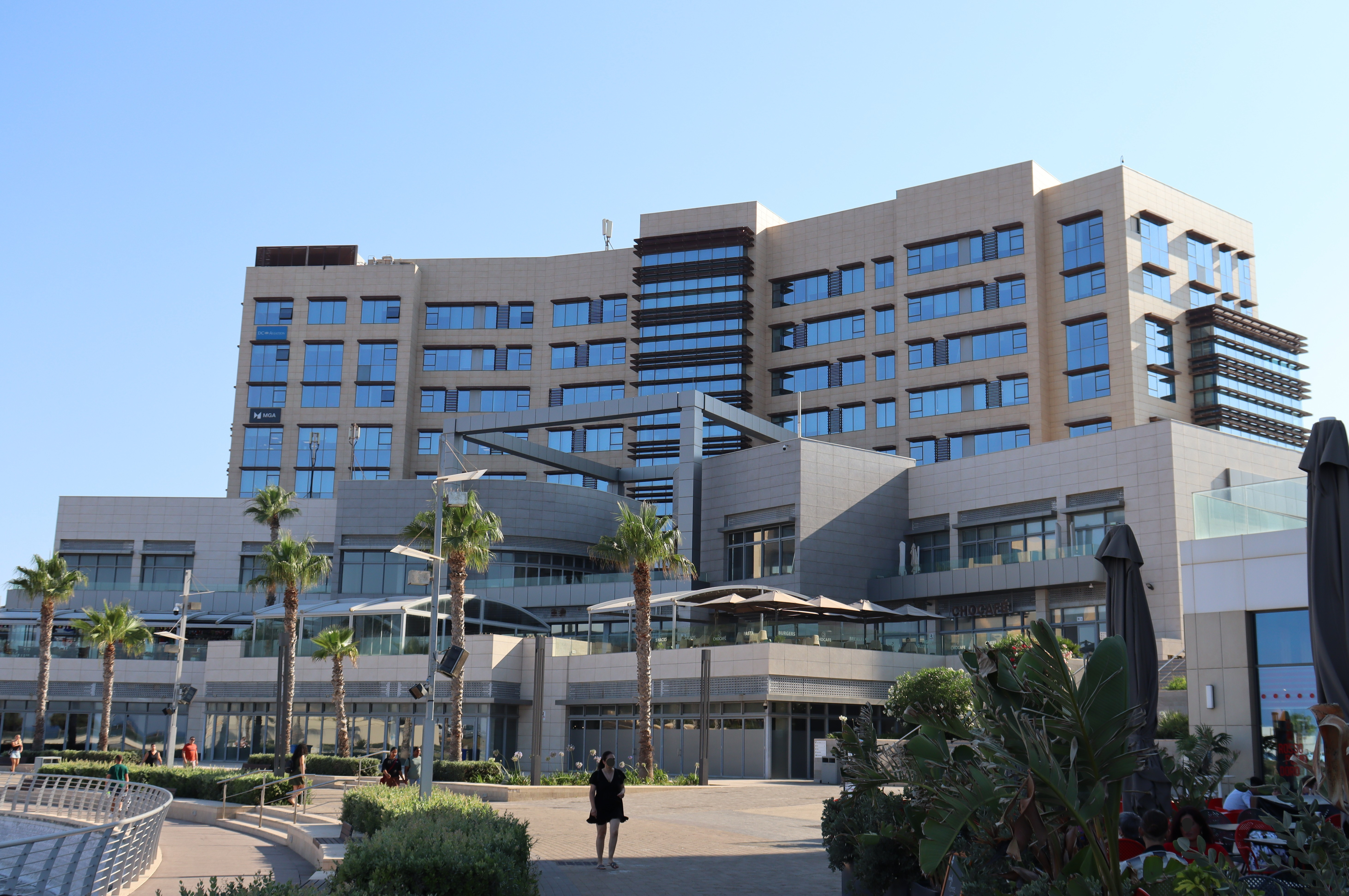
Smart City, a technology park and major business centre in Kalkara, pictured in 2026

As part of the government's vision to breathe a new lease of life into the Grand Harbour area, the site formerly occupied by the former Ricasoli Industrial Estate in the outskirts of Kalkara was earmarked to host the construction of Smart City Malta, which will be built on the same lines of Dubai Internet City. Construction began in 2008 and SCM1, the first office block, was completed and work is currently ongoing on the rest of the project, which will include office space, a hotel, residential units, catering establishments, and landscaped areas open to the public. According to the government this project will not only create around 7,000 new jobs when completed but will also inject new life in the area.

In keeping with Kalkara's maritime tradition, in 2010 the government announced the setting up of a temporary marina in Kalkara creek in order to provide more berthing spots for the ever-increasing demand from this sector.

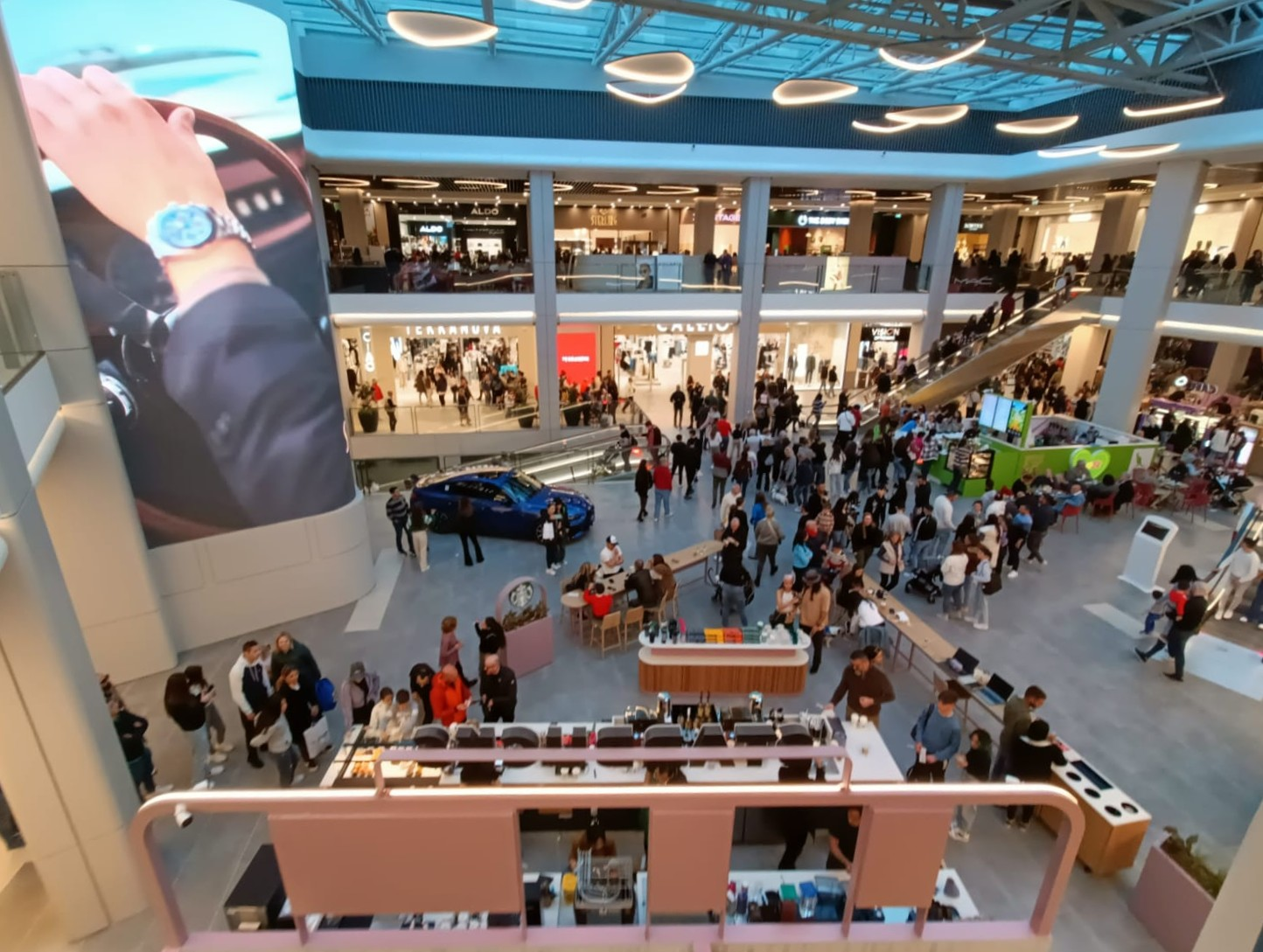
The Shoreline shopping mall on its opening day, 1 March 2024

The town also hosts the Malta Film Commission and the main facilities of the Malta Film Studios.

== Transport ==
Scheduled buses operated by Tallinja on Route 3 link Kalkara directly to the capital Valletta. Route 213, also passes from some parts of Kalkara, which provides access to transport to Mater Dei Hospital. The transport strategy for the Grand Harbour area also envisages a ferry service point in Kalkara with links to Valletta, the Three Cities and other areas within the harbour.

Due to the construction and development of Smart City Malta in the Ricasoli area, the construction of the South Harbour Link Road has been proposed in order to upgrade and improve the road network of the area and also cater for the influx of traffic once Smart City Malta is fully operational. The proposed new Link Road would directly link Smart City Malta to Malta's main arterial road network, however this proposal, which is still in its initial stages, would sacrifice agricultural land in the area between Kalkara and Zabbar if approved.

== Sports ==
Kalkara is known for the building of the local traditional boats, known as dgħajsa, and for their oarsmen (barklori). The Kalkariżi still take part in the national regattas held on 8 September and on 31 March with their own built boats.

== Zones ==
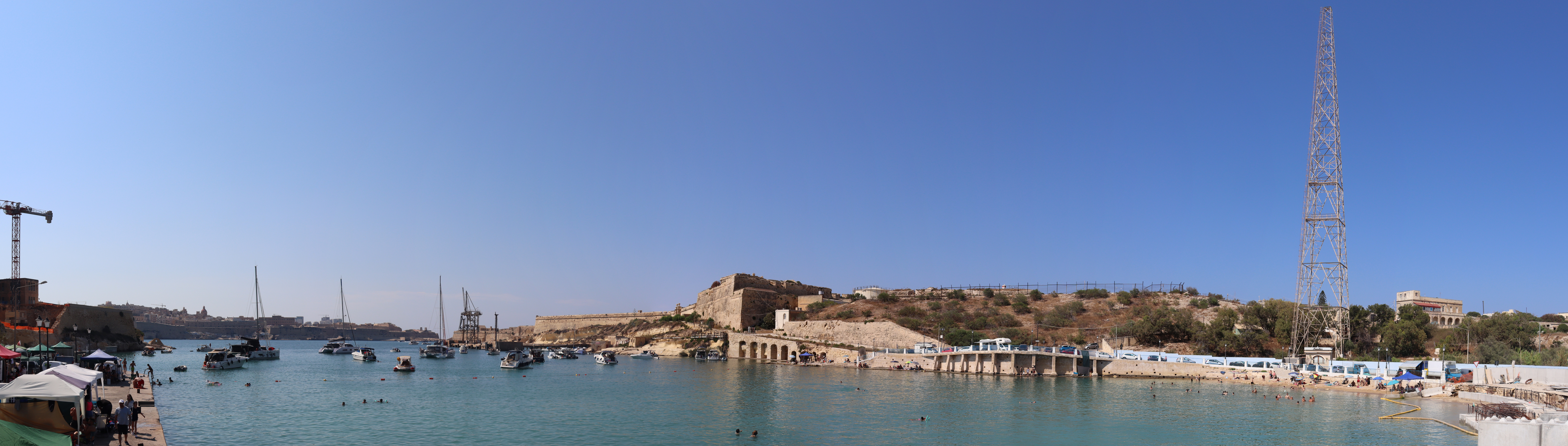
A panorama of Rinella Bay, taken in 2026. Valletta can be seen in the distance to the left.

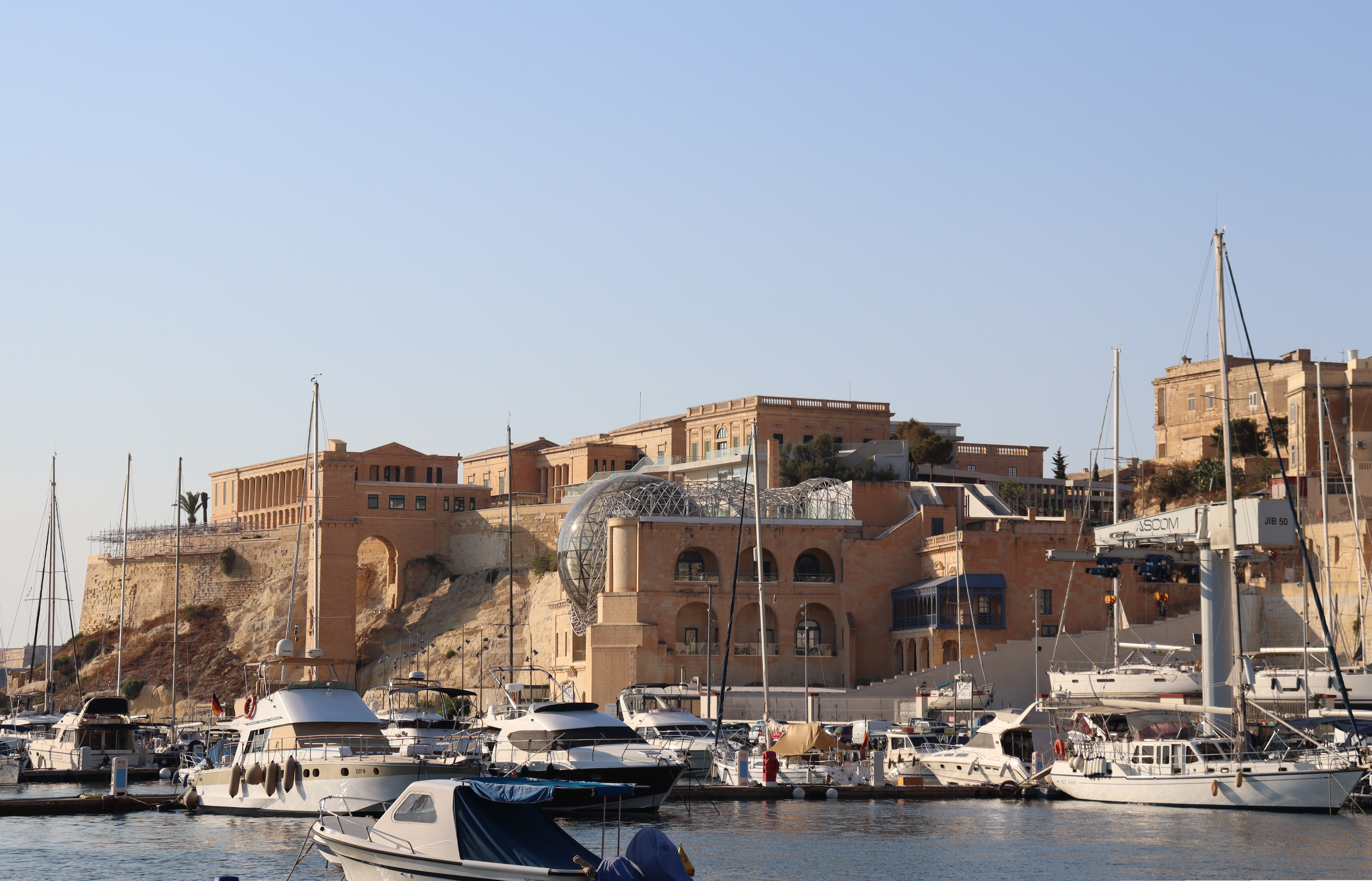
- Esplora, a science museum in Kalkara, as seen from the creek
  Bighi
- Fort Ricasoli
- Il-Wileġ (The Open Fields)
- It-Turretta (The Turrett)
- Kalkara Creek
- Ricasoli Point
- Rinella Bay
- Rnella Valley
- San Pietru (Saint Peter)
- Santa Liberata (Saint Liberatas)
- Santu Rokku (Saint Rocco)
- Smart City Malta (Ricasoli Industrial Estate)
- Ta' Tewma (Garlic's Village)
- Ta' Wied Għammieq (Ghammieq Valley's Village)
- Tar-Ramel (Sandy Village)
- Villa Portelli
- Wied Rinella (Rinella Valley)
- Il-Kapuccini

=== Main roads ===
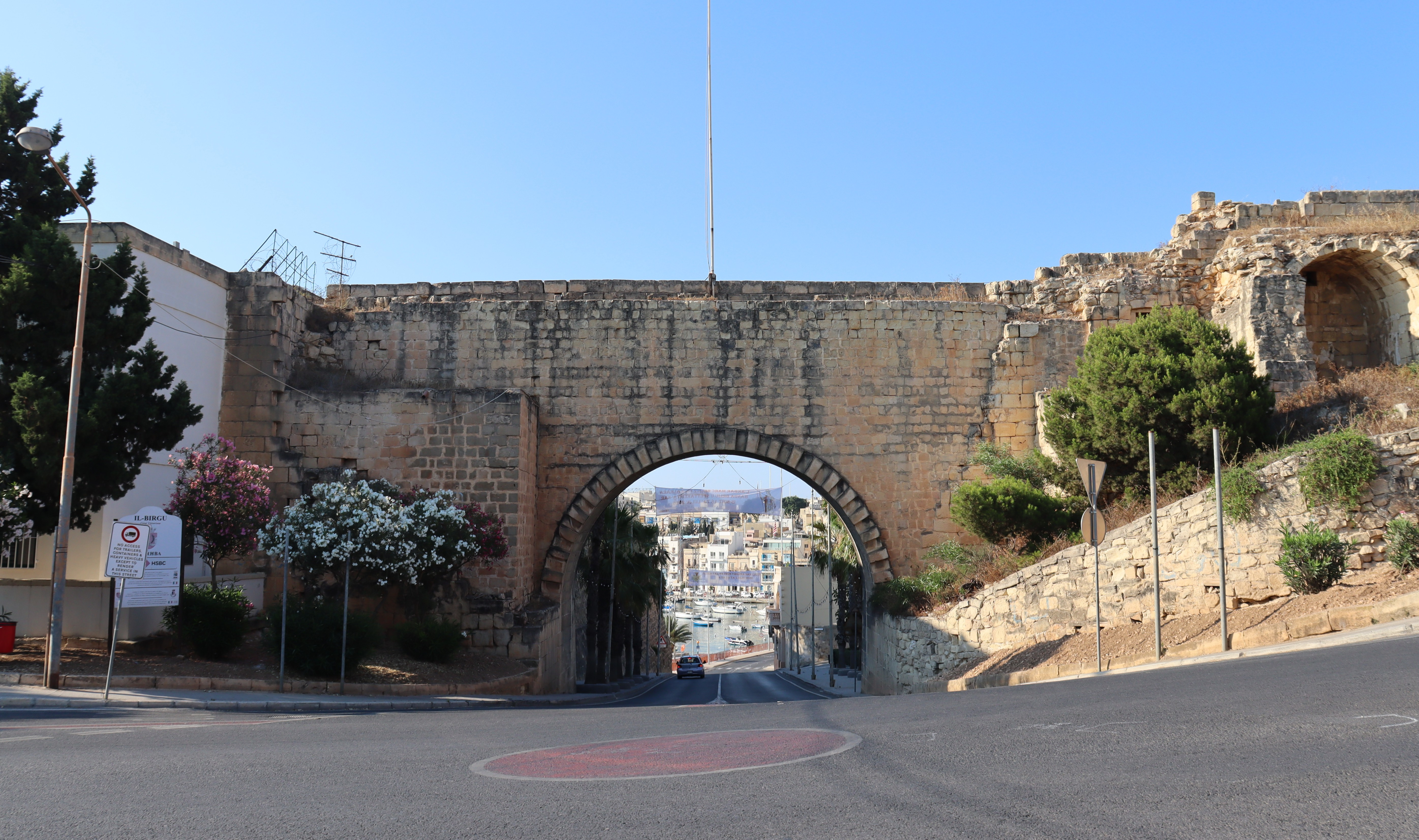
- The main entrance, pictured in 2026
  Misraħ l-Arċisqof Gonzi (Archbishop Gonzi Square)
- Triq il-Marina (Marina Street)
- Triq il-Missjoni Taljana (Italian Mission Street)
- Triq ir-Rnella (Rnella Street)
- Triq San Leonardu (St. Leonard Street)
- Triq Santa Liberta (St Libertas Street)
- Triq Santu Rokku (St Rocco Street)
- Xatt tal-Kalkara (Kalkara Strand)

== Twin towns – sister cities ==
Kalkara is twinned with:

- Crespellano, Italy

== See also ==
- RNH Bighi
- SmartCity Malta
- Kalkara F.C.
