= Mushaukwa Mukunyandela =

Zambian neurologist

Mushaukwa Mukunyandela (3 June 1945 – 28 March 2018) was the first Zambian neurologist and the first Zambian to be admitted as a full Member of the Royal College of Physicians (MRCP UK), at the age of 31.

He was one of the first graduates of the University of Zambia School of Medicine, graduating in 1973.

In October 2003, he was honoured by the Zambian President Levy Mwanawasa with the Grand Commander of the Order of Distinguished Service, First Division. Following this, in October 2014, he was again honoured along with 1,356 others including former President Kaunda, with the first ever special Single Class Golden Jubilee at an Investiture ceremony to mark Zambia's 50th Independence anniversary.

In addition to being the first (and for a long period, the only) Neurologist in the country, he has worked in several capacities including as the Assistant Dean of the School of Medicine at UNZA and Director of the TDRC in collaboration with the WHO. He has chaired medical boards and organizations including the MCZ, CBOH, NCH, ADH, ZFDS, NAC and Ndola Trust School.

He was survived by his wife, Joyce and had six children (with a deceased son, Chishibu, who was also a medical doctor) as well as six grand-children.
