= Muyoba Macwani =

Zambian politician and nuclear physicist

Muyoba Macwani is a nuclear physicist who is a political Zambian figure and has been actively involved in the fight for equal rights for all Zambians and has taken an active role in the fight for the restoration of the Barotseland agreement in the Zambian constitution.

== Education ==
Muyoba Macwani is a nuclear physicist who did his undergraduate studies at the University of Zambia. He obtained his master's from the University of Surrey after which he obtained his PhD in nuclear physics in 1982 with a focus in Neutron activation analysis without multi-element standards from Imperial College London.

== Career ==
Macwani was the party president of the Caucus for National Unity (CNN) in 1997 which was a split group from the Movement for Multi-Party Democracy (MMD). He has been actively involved in the fight for the restoration of the Barotseland Agreement in the Constitution, which was terminated by the Zambian government. Macwani has been involved in the flight for equity for all Zambians and took an active role in the fight for the slogan of One Zambia One Nation in trying to unite all the people of Zambia in terms of being equal and one. The former University of Barotseland Vice-Chancellor has also been instrumental in fighting for equal opportunity for rural students and furthermore calling for the Zambian government to make education a priority for the development of Zambia. Macwani was also involved in the site investigations and risk assessments carried out in the proposed rehabilitation projects on the Ndola - Mufulira - Mwambashi (M4), Mufulira and Border with DR Congo (M5) and Kafulafuta-Luanshya (M6) Roads to fully ascertain the impacts of the rehabilitation works and development of mitigation measures.
