= Lubinda Haabazoka =

- Born: February 27, 1981 (age 45); Lusaka, Zambia
- Known for: Financial markets, Development economics, Monetary policy

Academic background
- Education: Rostov State Economics University

Lubinda Haabazoka (born 27 February 1981) is a Zambian economist and academic who serves as an Associate Professor of Banking and Financial Economics at the University of Zambia. Previously, he was President of the Zambia Economics Association. Haabazoka was elected Economics Association of Zambia President in Lusaka in 2018.

== Early life and education ==
Haabazoka was born in Zambia on 27 February 1981. He attended primary school at Buteko Basic in Luanshya. He then attended Luanshya Boys Secondary School and later Kafue Boys. He obtained both his Master of Science in Finance and Credit and his Doctor of Philosophy (PhD) in Economics with a specialization in Banking from Rostov State Economics University in the Russian Federation. Haazaboka was educated in Russia after which he returned to Zambia and joined The Copperbelt University and the University of Zambia as a lecturer in the Graduate School of Business. He has published publications in economics, banking and finance.

== Academia ==
Haabazoka first joined the academia as a senior lecturer in Economics, Banking and Finance at the Copperbelt University where he also served as head of department of Accounting and Finance Department. He later joined the University of Zambia at the Graduate School of Business. He has published 32 peer reviewed journals. In February 2026, he was appointed as an Associate Professor of Economics.

== Economics Association of Zambia Presidency ==
In July 2018, Haabazoka was elected Economics Association of Zambia President in Lusaka During his tenure he vowed to inject new life into EAZ. He had spent time advocating for Zambia not to take IMF bailouts saying it would not be best for the economy at the time.
