= SmartCity Malta =

Technology park in Malta

Coordinates: 35°53′27″N 14°32′25″E

Smart City
- Type: ICT and media park
- Industry: Information Technology Business Park
- Genre: Infrastructure Service Provider
- Founded: 10 September 2007
- Founder: TECOM Investments and Sama Dubai
- Headquarters: Kalkara, Malta

SmartCity is a technology park under development in Kalkara, Malta. The original plan was to transform the Ricasoli Industrial Estate into an information technology and media city on the models of Dubai Internet City and Dubai Media City. The project was unveiled on 10 September 2007 by then Prime Minister of Malta, Lawrence Gonzi. The project was estimated to cost at least €275 million. The whole development, which covers an area of 360,000 square metres, was planned to be completed in 2021, although the first offices opened in 2010.

In May 2018, it was revealed that Malta Properties Company was in talks with SmartCity (Dubai) for the latter to acquire its majority shareholding in SmartCity (Malta). In June 2018 the Planning Authority announced that it was considering changes to the master plan for the rezoning of certain areas for residential development, possibly indicating that the project for an ICT village was being abandoned and replaced with plans for a residential area.

== Outline planning ==
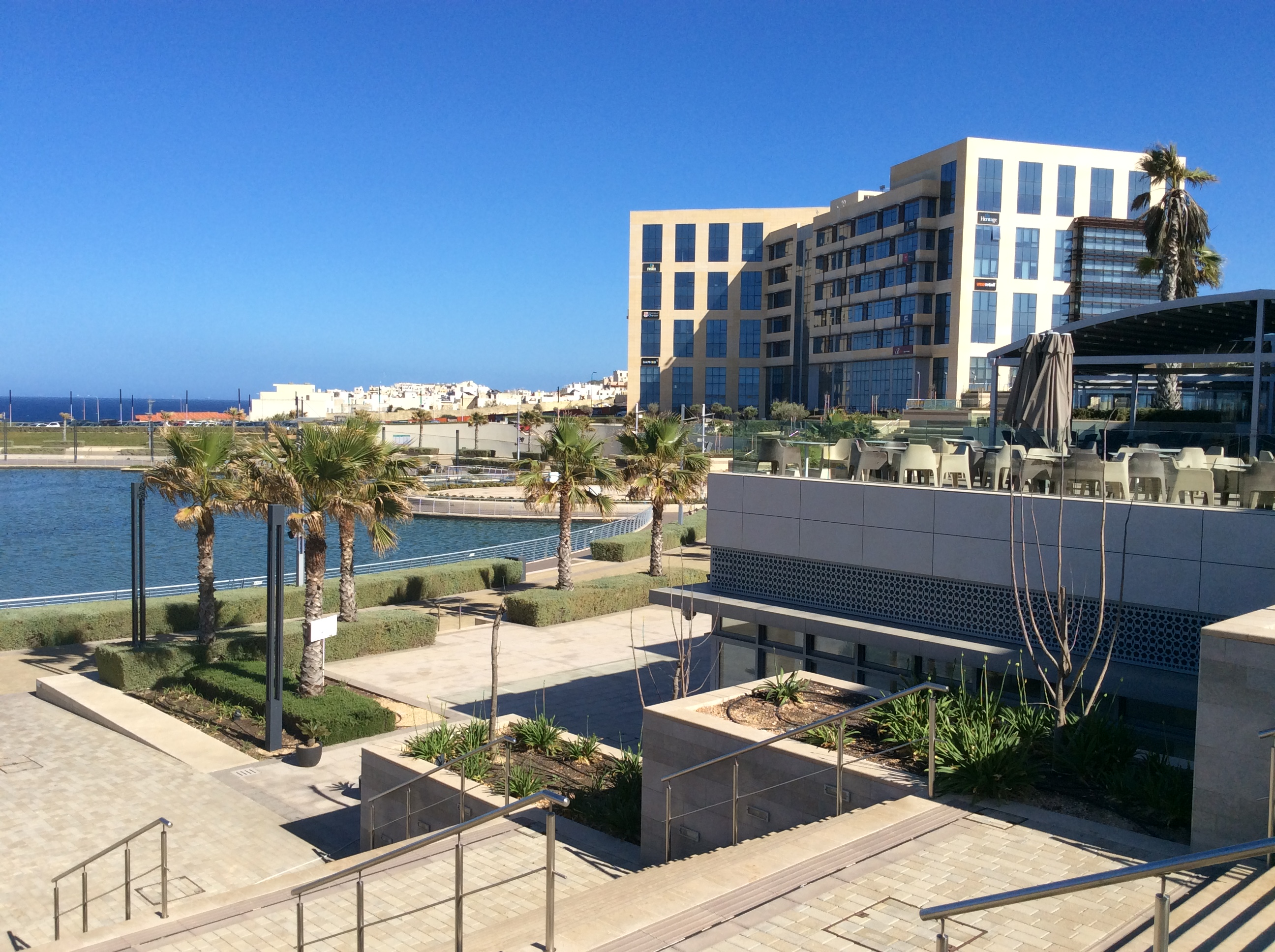
One of the main buildings, its surrounding restaurants, and a dancing fountain, seen in 2017

On 23 April 2008 it was announced that the decision by SmartCity Malta to allocate more space for its business park meant that this park would employ more than 8,500 people, when the agreed figure for employment there had been 3,000. Smart City Malta, would have the space to employ 11,000, making it one of the biggest economic concentrations in Malta.

SmartCity Malta formally submitted its outline planning application for the development at Ricasoli to the Malta Environment and Planning Authority (Mepa) on 29 April 2008. The submission includes a full Environmental Impact Assessment and Traffic Impact Assessment. SmartCity Malta has applied for up to 158,500 square metres of business space, which represents an increase of 54 per cent over the business space which Smart City Malta is contractually bound to develop. On the other hand, the gross floor area of the residential component has been reduced by 30 per cent, down to 60,000 square metres. In terms of the Outline Planning Application, the residential component makes up 19 per cent of the total gross floor area of the project.

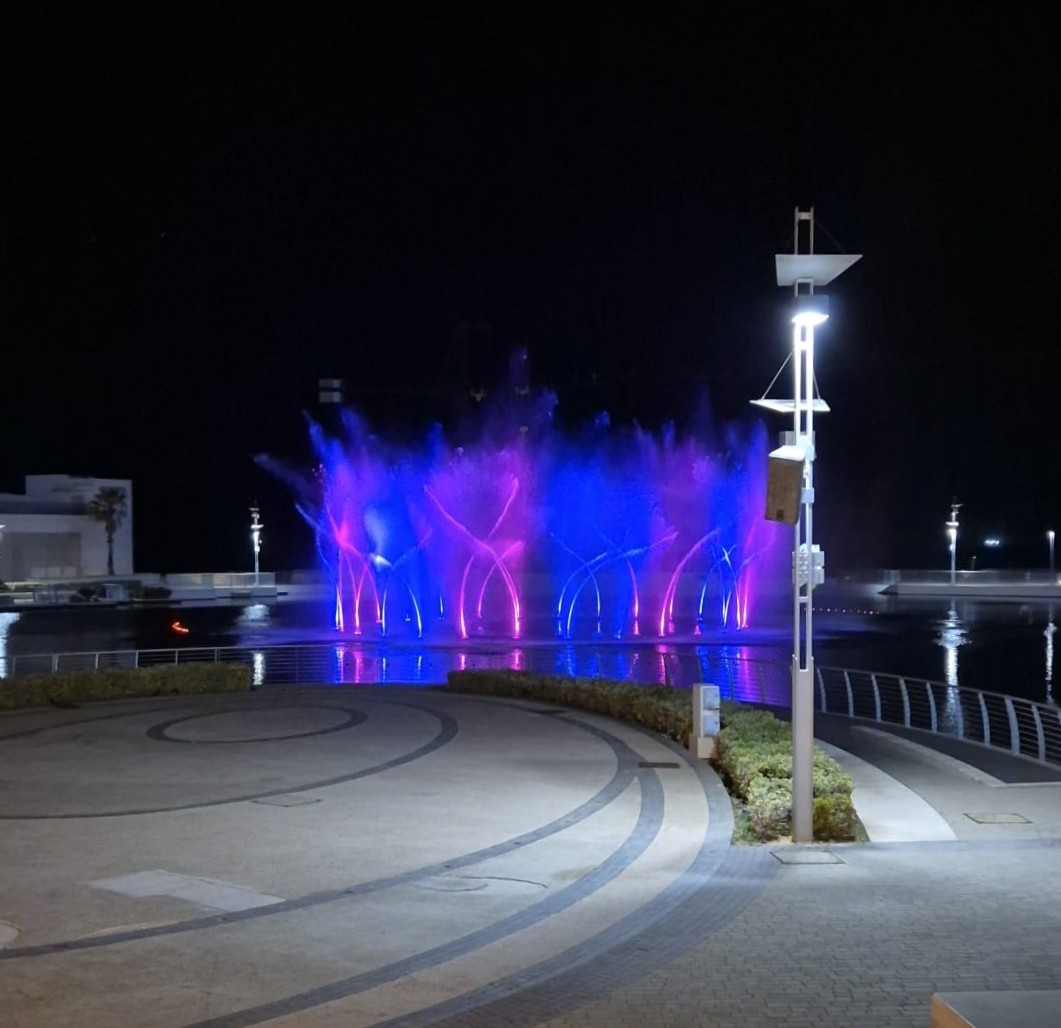
The dancing fountain in action

The application also provides for a huge public open space of 118,000 square metres, to serve as a primary recreational area for neighbouring communities. The energy requirements for Smart City Malta will be of 41.2MW.

SmartCity Malta has been allocated a budget of €48 million for 2010. SmartCity has also drawn up plans to market the project in China, Japan, Korea, Australia and Egypt.

In June 2018 the Planning Authority announced that it was considering changes to the master plan for the rezoning of certain areas for residential development. In a separate report, the Environment and Resources Authority stated that "the development of Smart City was proceeding at a much slower rate than was envisaged.” This announcement coincided with reports that Malta Properties Company was in talks with SmartCity (Dubai) for the acquisition of the latter's majority shareholding in SmartCity (Malta).

== Plans for residential units ==
In June 2017, it was reported that real estate agents were advertising high-end residential apartments within the SmartCity site, even though the master plan and the permits issued by the Planning Authority did not feature any permits for residential units. In June 2018 it was confirmed that the Planning Authority was considering changes to the master plans for drastic increases to the height limitations, and rezoning of certain areas for residential development.

== Commercial space ==
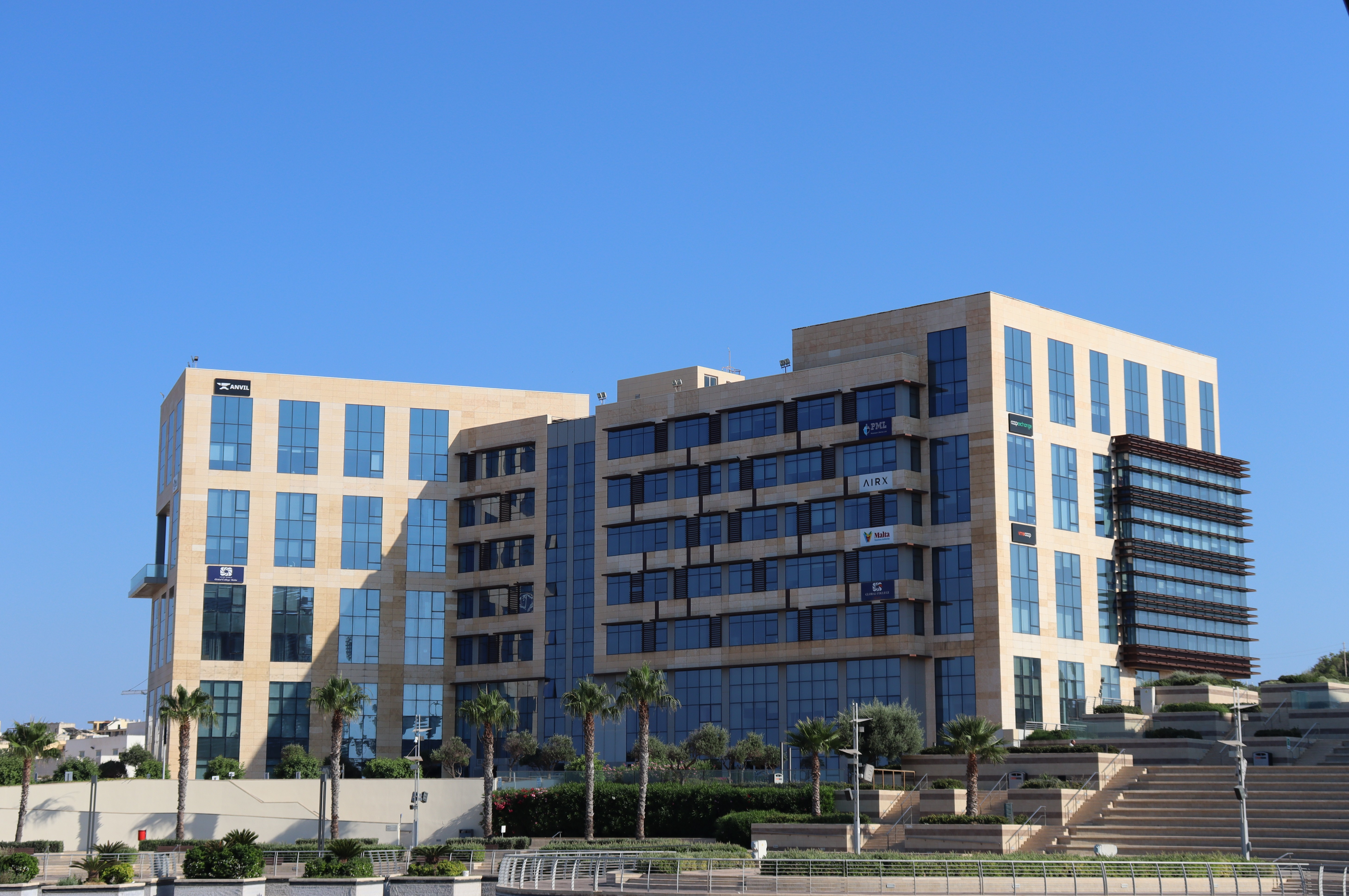
A major office building hosting such businesses as Anvil Game Studios and VME Retail, pictured in 2026

The office blocks within the commercial space are designed to support data-intensive operations, incorporating multiple redundant systems to maintain business continuity.

The SmartCity campus is managed through the Central Campus Management System (CCMS) and is monitored and secured 24/7. Thermal comfort and Air Quality control is maintained through the use of HVAC systems that provide office tenants a filtered and controlled environmental experience. Lighting is handled using an Intelligent BMS (Building Management System).

== See also ==
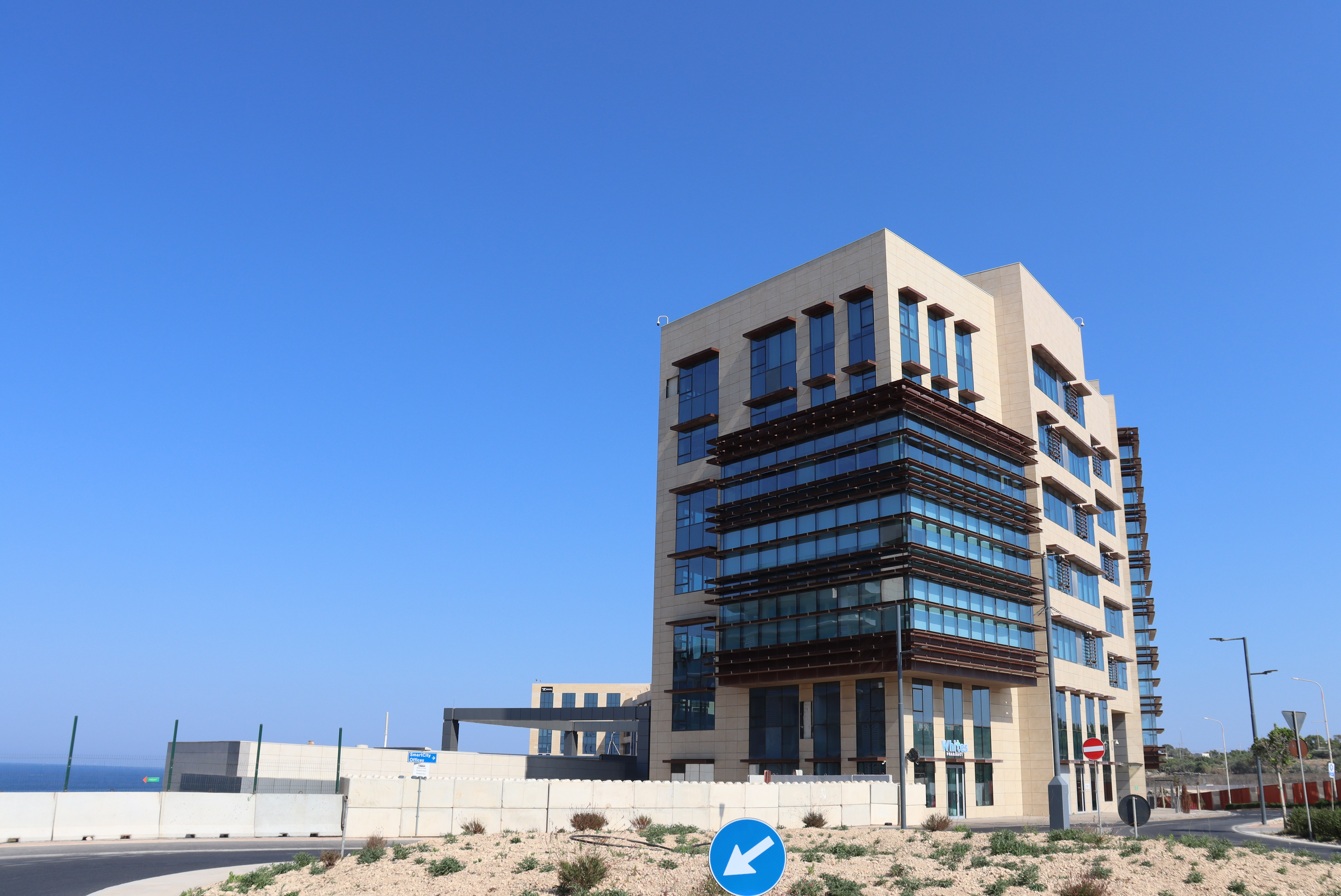
As seen from behind the site, in 2026

- Smart City
- Dubai Media City
- Dubai Internet City
- Smart City, Kochi
