= Student Christian Movement =

Student Christian Movement may refer to one of the following national organizations:

- Australian Student Christian Movement
- Student Christian Movement of Canada
- Student Christian Movement of Great Britain
- Indonesian Student Christian Movement
- Student Christian Movement of the Philippines

It may also refer to the international umbrella organization:

- World Student Christian Federation
