= Ricasoli =

Ricasoli may refer to:

== People ==
- Bettino Ricasoli (1809–1880), Italian statesman
- Giovanni Francesco Ricasoli (died 1673), Italian knight and naval officer

== Other uses ==
- Fort Ricasoli, a fort in Kalkara, Malta
- Italian destroyer Bettino Ricasoli
