= Royal Regiment of Malta =

- Active: 1804–1811
- Country: United Kingdom
- Branch: British Army
- Type: Infantry
- Size: 10 companies
- Engagements: Napoleonic Wars

Commanders
- Colonel: William Villettes (1804–08); Gen. John Murray (1808–09)

The Royal Regiment of Malta was an infantry regiment of the British Army which existed from 1804 to 1811. It was raised in Malta, then a British protectorate, with the intention of being sent in overseas expeditions. The unit was raised following the success of the Maltese Light Infantry at the Siege of Porto Ferrajo in 1801.

The regiment was established on 7 December 1804, and it appeared on the Army List of 30 March 1805. The military unit was commanded by Major General William Villettes, who was also the overall commander of British troops in Malta and had the rank of Colonel of the regiment. It was led by British, Maltese and German officers, and it mainly consisted of men discharged from the Maltese Provincial Battalions along with around 100 Sicilians and some Spaniards. Due to the Royal Regiment having higher pay, many men resigned from the Provincials to join the new regiment, such that there was a shortage of men in the Provincials and the two-battalion military unit had to be reduced to a single battalion in 1806.

The regiment included a total of 514 officers and men by mid-1805, and this increased to 758 in mid-1806. The Civil Commissioner of Malta, Captain Alexander Ball, was dissatisfied with the regiment's lack of discipline, and wanted the men to be sent abroad to Gibraltar or Sicily. The Royal Regiment of Malta reached its peak strength of 942 men in 1807, when it consisted of ten companies. It took part in surrounding Fort Ricasoli during the Froberg mutiny in April 1807.

On 10 November 1807, about 950 men from the regiment joined the British forces in Sicily. The men embarked from Milazzo to reinforce the garrison of Capri in September 1808, occupying the town of Diamante on the way. The companies of the Royal Regiment of Malta were distributed between the main town of Capri and the rest of the island. Two weeks after the arrival of the regiment, on 4 October 1808, a Franco-Neapolitan force of 1,974 soldiers landed at Capri. The French attacked Anacapri on 15 October and most of the Maltese troops stationed there were captured, killed or wounded. Sources differ as to how many men were killed or wounded, from about 25 men to three quarters of the regiment. 120 others were wounded. Between 250 and 680 men of the regiment surrendered after running out of gunpowder, and they were subsequently imprisoned in Naples and Castel Nuovo. Between 270 and 300 Maltese soldiers managed to avoid capture and returned to Malta in 1809. Villettes remained in command of the unit until 3 January 1808, when he left Malta for the Colony of Jamaica and was succeeded by Gen. John Murray

By 1810, the remaining men of the Royal Regiment of Malta were garrisoned at Cottonera. In March 1811 they were sent to Gozo where they guarded French prisoners, while a detachment served on a gunboat in Sicily. The regiment was disbanded by Hildebrand Oakes at Fort Tigné on 26 April 1811, and the men were encouraged to join other British military units serving in the Mediterranean, or the Maltese Provincial Battalion.
