= Chapel of St Nicholas, Fort Ricasoli =

Chapel of St Nicholas
- Kappella ta' San Nikola
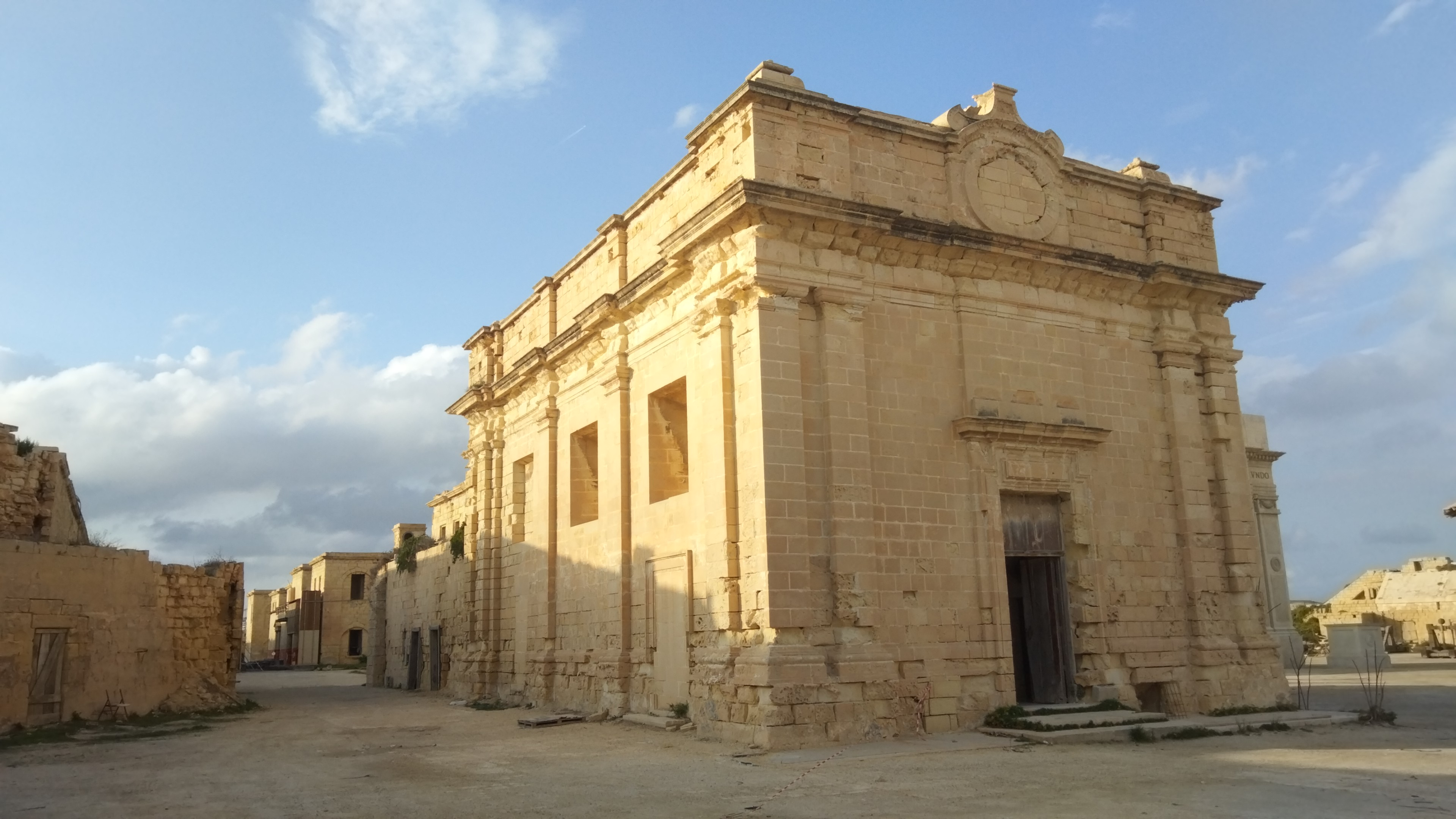
- Exterior of the Chapel of St Nicholas
- Chapel of St Nicholas
- 35°53′47.5″N 14°31′36.4″E
- Location: Fort Ricasoli, Kalkara, Malta
- Denomination: Roman Catholic

History
- Status: Chapel; Parish church (formerly)
- Dedication: Saint Nicholas
- Consecrated: 15 May 1698

Architecture
- Functional status: Closed
- Style: Mannerist/Baroque
- Years built: 1696–1698

Specifications
- Length: c. 18 m (59 ft)
- Width: c. 9 m (30 ft)
- Materials: Limestone

Administration
- Archdiocese: Malta
- Parish: Kalkara

The Chapel of St Nicholas (Maltese: Kappella ta' San Nikola) is a Roman Catholic chapel located in Fort Ricasoli in Kalkara, Malta. It was built between 1696 and 1698 as a parish church for the fort's garrison, and it was dedicated to Saint Nicholas of Bari. The chapel remained in use until the fort was decommissioned in the 1960s, and it fell into a state of disrepair. Currently there are plans to restore the chapel along with the rest of the fort.

== History ==
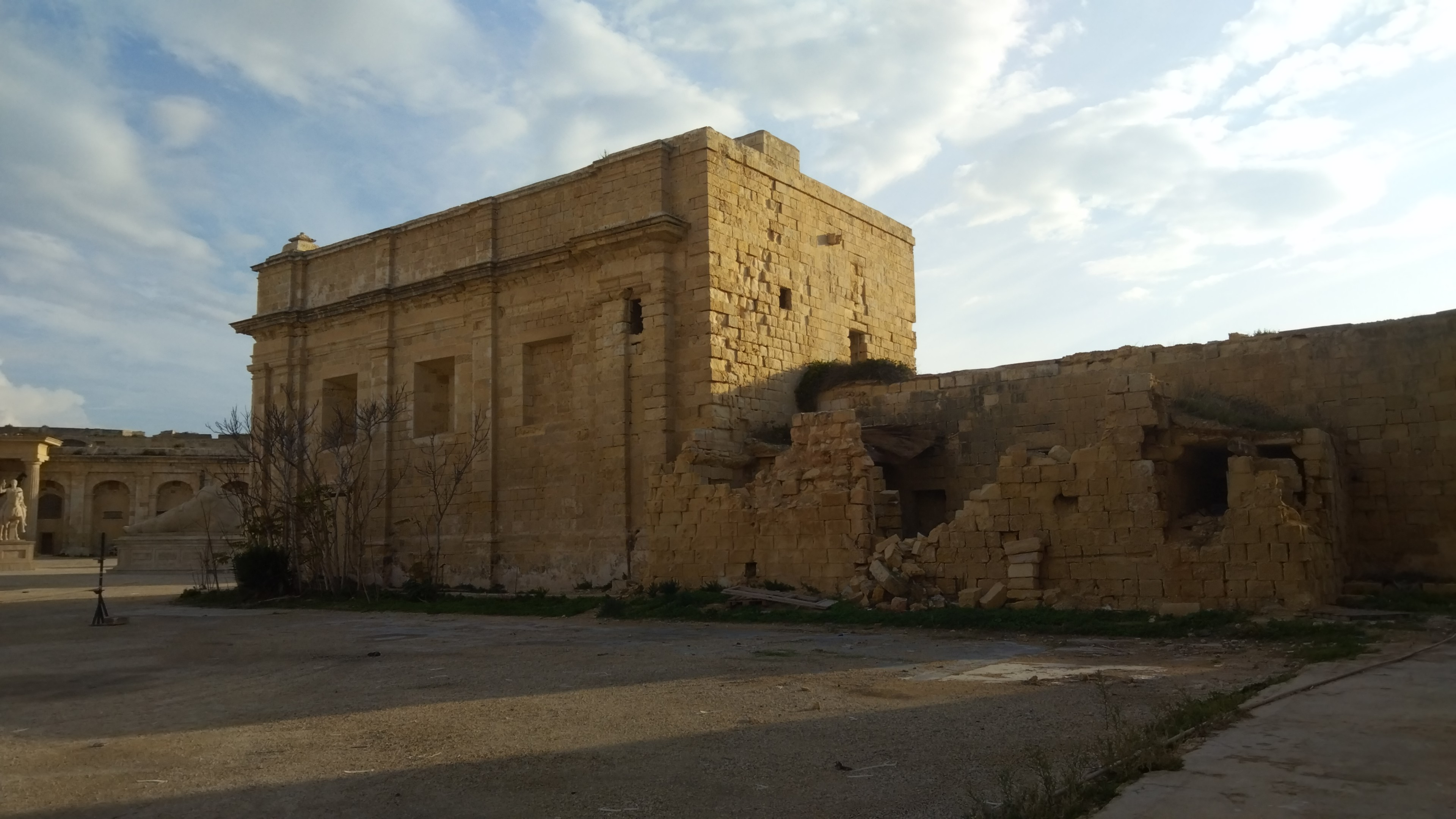
The chapel as seen from the backside

The Order of St John began to construct Fort Ricasoli in 1670. It was standard practice to include chapels in Hospitaller fortifications, and the military engineer Mederico Blondel was appointed to draw up plans for the chapel. Blondel initially proposed a church set within the fortification walls, but it was later decided to build it in a more central location near the fort's main gate. On 29 September 1693, Pope Innocent XII declared that the fort's chapel would be a parish church under the Order's jurisdiction.

Work on the chapel commenced sometime after 31 March 1696. Construction and maintenance was funded by the Fondazione Cotoner which had been established by Grand Master Nicolás Cotoner. The chapel was consecrated on 15 May 1698 and it was dedicated to Saint Nicholas, Cotoner's namesake. The consecration ceremony coincided with the completion of the fortress, and it was attended by the new Grand Master Ramón Perellós and various other dignitaries. The chapel was granted the status of a parish church on 19 May 1698, and it was subsequently used by the fort's garrison.

In 1700, a dispute between the Bishop of Malta and the Grand Master arose over their jurisdiction on the chapel. The chapel remained in use after Malta came under British rule in the 19th century, when it served the needs of Maltese soldiers within the fort. On 10 December 1897, the chapel fell under the jurisdiction of the newly-established parish of St Joseph of Kalkara.

Fort Ricasoli was decommissioned by the British military in 1964. The chapel was subsequently abandoned or used as storage space, and it fell into a state of disrepair. In 2011 it was reported that a tomb in its crypt had been desecrated. Plans to restore the chapel along with the rest of the fort were approved in 2019.

The chapel is listed on the National Inventory of the Cultural Property of the Maltese Islands.

== Architecture ==
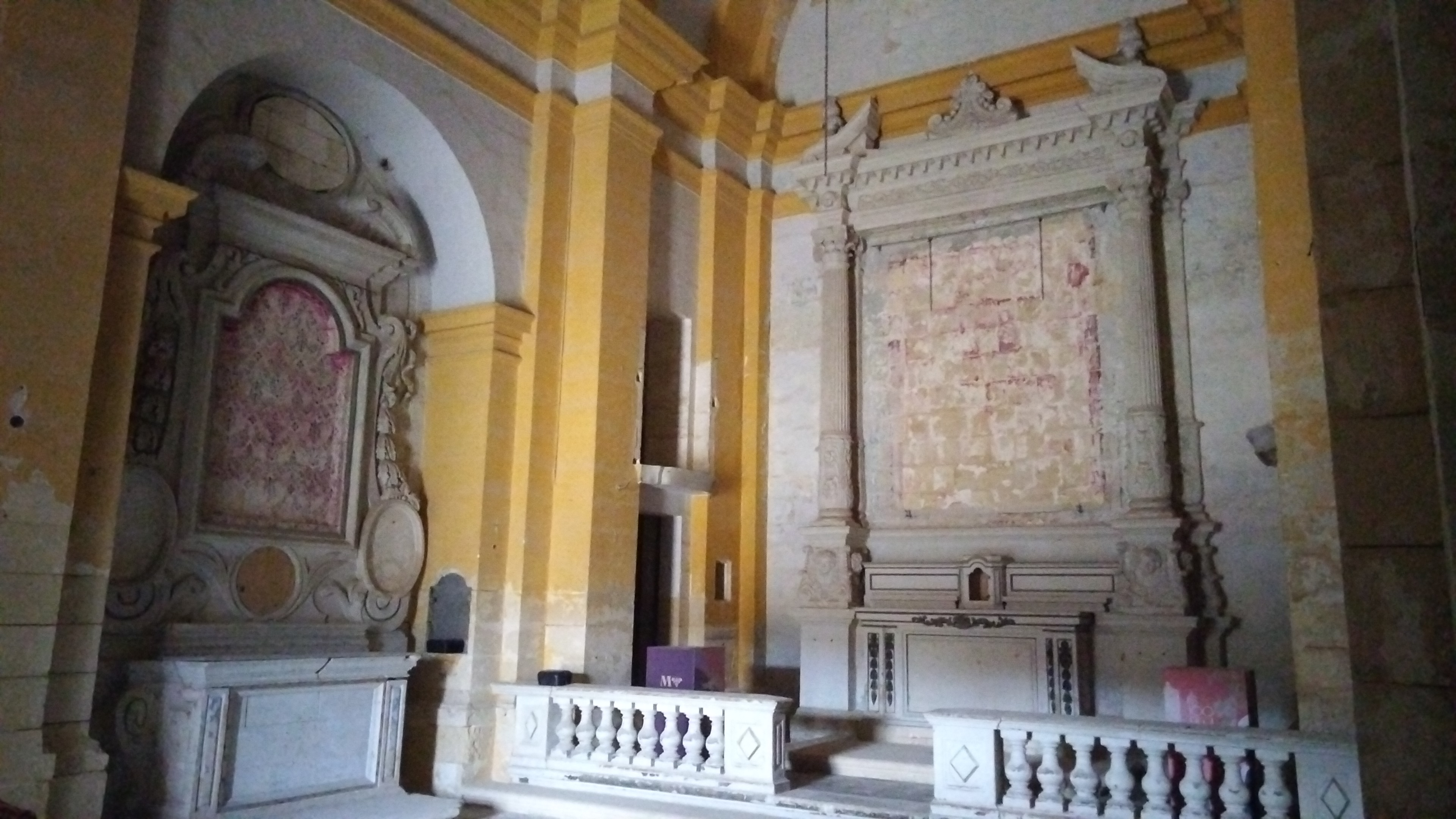
Interior of the chapel with the main altar on the right

The Chapel of St Nicholas has a simple, militaristic design with subdued Mannerist and Baroque influences. Its exterior is characterized by Tuscan pilasters and a cornice, and several windows allow natural light to enter the building.

The chapel has a rectangular plan of about 18 by 9 metres (59 ft × 30 ft), and internally it contains three altars: a main altar dedicated to St Nicholas and secondary ones dedicated to Our Lady of the Pillar and John the Evangelist. The latter two were established in 1749 and 1750 respectively.

Underneath the building there is a crypt. This contains a main altar dedicated to Our Lady of Sorrows and secondary altars dedicated to the Holy Cross and the Flagellation of Christ, which were founded in 1751 and 1757 respectively.

== Artworks and relics ==
The chapel contained a number of artworks, and the main altarpiece which depicted St Nicholas with Grand Master Cotoner was painted by Mattia Preti. The church also included a painting of Our Lady of Victories which was probably a copy of one found in Conventual Church of St John, a painting of St Nicholas which was brought to Malta by the Tolossenti family in 1530 and which was donated to the church in 1744, and a painting of Giovanni Battista Bosa, who was a former chaplain of Fort Ricasoli.

About 77 relics were formerly housed in the chapel, and the most prestigious ones were housed in a box under the main altar.
