= William Villettes =

British Army general

General William Villettes
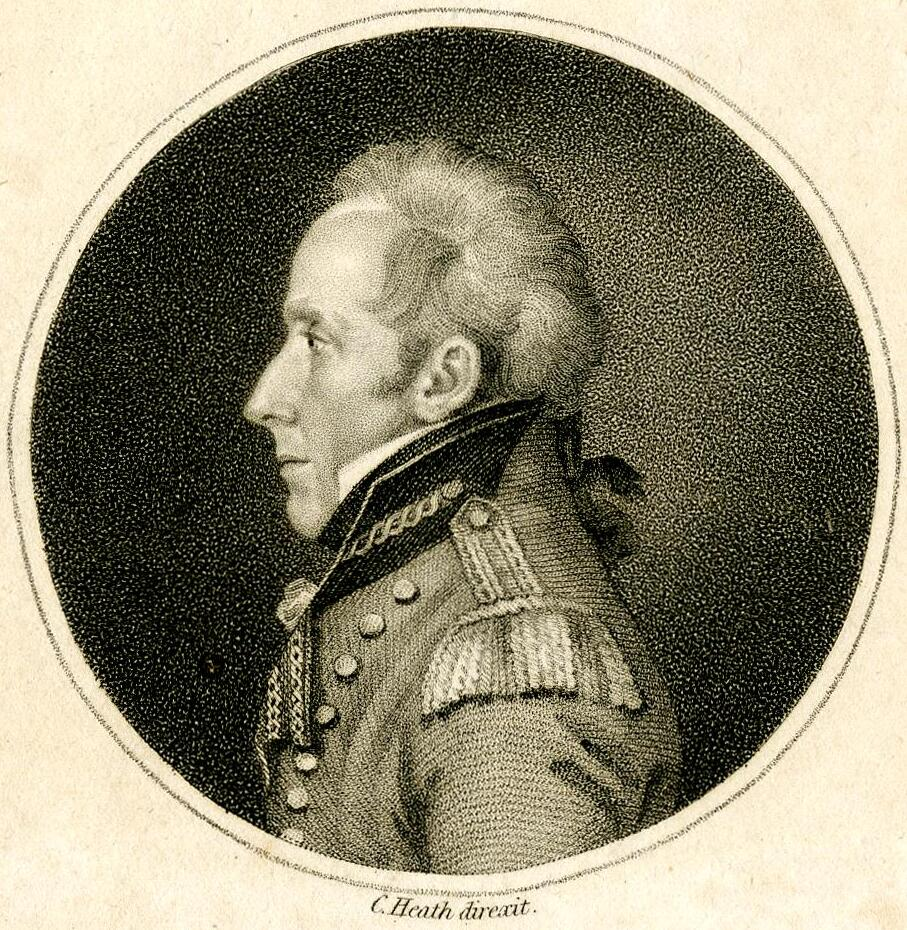
- Portrait by Charles Heath, 1808
- Born: 14 June 1754; Bern, Switzerland
- Died: 13 July 1808 (aged 54); British Jamaica
- Military career
- Allegiance: Kingdom of Great Britain (to 1800); United Kingdom (from 1801)
- Branch: British Army
- Service years: 1775–1808
- Rank: General
- Conflicts: French Revolutionary War; Siege of Toulon; Invasion of Corsica; Napoleonic Wars

General William Anne Villettes (20 August 1754 – 13 July 1808) was a senior officer of the British Army during the early nineteenth century. His career saw service in the Mediterranean, particularly during the Invasion of Corsica in 1794 and at the Malta Protectorate after British occupation in 1800. He died in 1808 while serving as military commander in British Jamaica and is buried at Half Way Tree.

== Life ==
Villettes was born in 1754 to a Huguenot family, the son of diplomat Arthur Villettes, British ambassador to the Old Swiss Confederacy at Bern. He was educated in Bath, Somerset and then at the University of St Andrews, but subsequently persuaded his father to purchase a commission in the 10th Light Dragoons in 1775. He remained with the regiment until 1787, when he became a major in the 12th Light Dragoons. For most of this period he served as aide to Sir William Pitt in Ireland, until in 1791 he became the lieutenant colonel of the 69th Regiment of Foot.

Following the outbreak of the French Revolutionary Wars his regiment was posted to the Mediterranean and he served at the Siege of Toulon in 1793. After the withdrawal he joined the army engaged in the Invasion of Corsica and led the 1,200 strong army at the Siege of Bastia. At the conclusion of the siege he was appointed governor of the town and in 1796 led a force to put down a rebellion inland, although terms were reached before he could press the attack. He returned to Britain late in the year and in 1797 briefly joined an expedition to Portugal as the colonel of the 1st Dragoon Guards. He later served in the household of Prince Edward, Duke of Kent and Strathearn.

In 1798 he was promoted to major-general and the following year was sent on a mission to Corfu to raise an army of Albanian irregulars, although this proved impossible. In 1801 he joined the garrison of the Malta Protectorate, which had been captured the year before and in 1802 became the commander in chief of the British Army in the Mediterranean. During this service he raised the Royal Regiment of Malta; managed the aftermath of a major ammunition explosion and in 1807 helped to put down the Froberg mutiny. In 1805 he was promoted to lieutenant general.

He was recalled to Britain in 1807, and then sent to the Colony of Jamaica as military commander in chief, with the local rank of general. In July 1808 he left on a tour of the island but took ill at Union, and swiftly died. He was buried at Half Way Tree on the outskirts of Kingston. A memorial was erected in Westminster Abbey.
