= Froberg mutiny =

1807 mutiny against the British in Malta

Coordinates: 35°53′49″N 14°31′42″E

- Part of the Napoleonic Wars
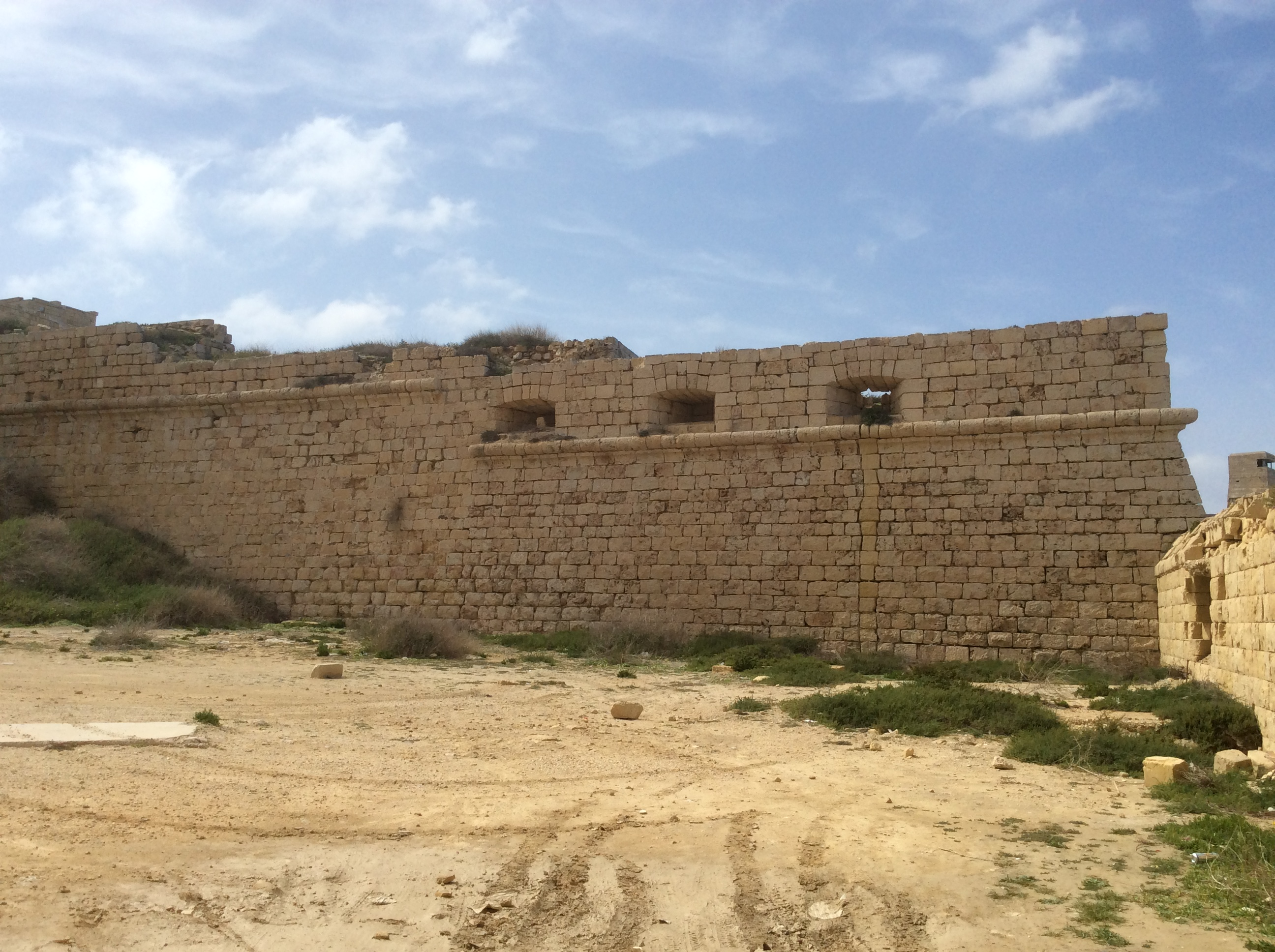
- St. Dominic Demi-Bastion at Fort Ricasoli, where the mutineers blew up the magazine
Date	4–12 April 1807 (1 week and 1 day)
Location	Fort Ricasoli, Malta
Result	Mutiny suppressed

Belligerents
Rebels	United Kingdom

Commanders and leaders
Caro Mitro (executed)	(United Kingdom) William Villettes (United Kingdom) Lieutenant de Clermont

Units involved
Froberg Regiment rebels	39th Regiment; Royal Maltese Regiment; Froberg Regiment loyalists

Strength
200 soldiers	Several regiments

Casualties and losses
1 killed 29–30 executed Others captured	6+ killed 4 wounded
- Location within Malta

The Froberg mutiny was a mutiny within the British armed forces staged between 4 and 12 April 1807 at Fort Ricasoli on the island of Malta, then a British protectorate, by the Froberg Regiment. The regiment had been formed using dubious methods, with personnel recruited from various nationalities in Albania and the Ottoman Empire. The troops, who had arrived on Malta in 1806, were unhappy with their rank and pay. The mutiny lasted for eight days, during which several people were killed and the fort was damaged. The mutiny was put down and the ringleaders were executed. It was one of the most serious mutinies of the Napoleonic Wars.

== Background ==
The Froberg Regiment was founded in December 1803 by the French royalist Gustave de Montjoie, who claimed he was the German Count Froberg. He was given permission by the Secretary at War to raise a regiment for service on Malta, which he did in Albania and the Christian parts of the Ottoman Empire. It consisted of men of various nationalities, including Germans, Poles, Swiss, Albanians, Bulgarians, Greeks, and Russians. Froberg's recruiting methods were problematic: according to Adam Neale in his Travels Through Some Parts of Germany, Poland, Moldavia and Turkey, "the most unprincipled deceit and falsehood were employed to obtain recruits".

The regiment's 513 men arrived on Malta in 1806. The regiment was commanded by Major Schumelketel and Lieutenant Schwartz, the latter of whom had supervised the dubious recruiting process. Soon after their arrival, some of the men of the regiment began to complain: they had been promised high rank with good pay but were forced to work as privates at lower wages. While the men were quarantined at the Lazzaretto on Manoel Island, they demanded to be sent back to Corfu. After Schwartz threatened to stop their food rations they withdrew their demands, but the threat itself created more discontent.

After the release from quarantine, the soldiers were allowed to go into the capital Valletta, where they quarrelled amongst themselves and with the locals. To prevent unrest, the Commander of the British Forces in Malta, William Villettes, confined them to Fort Ricasoli, a large fortification at the entrance of the Grand Harbour. In November 1806, Villettes appointed Lieutenant-Colonel James Barnes as the regiment's commander, which only increased their resentment.

== Mutiny ==
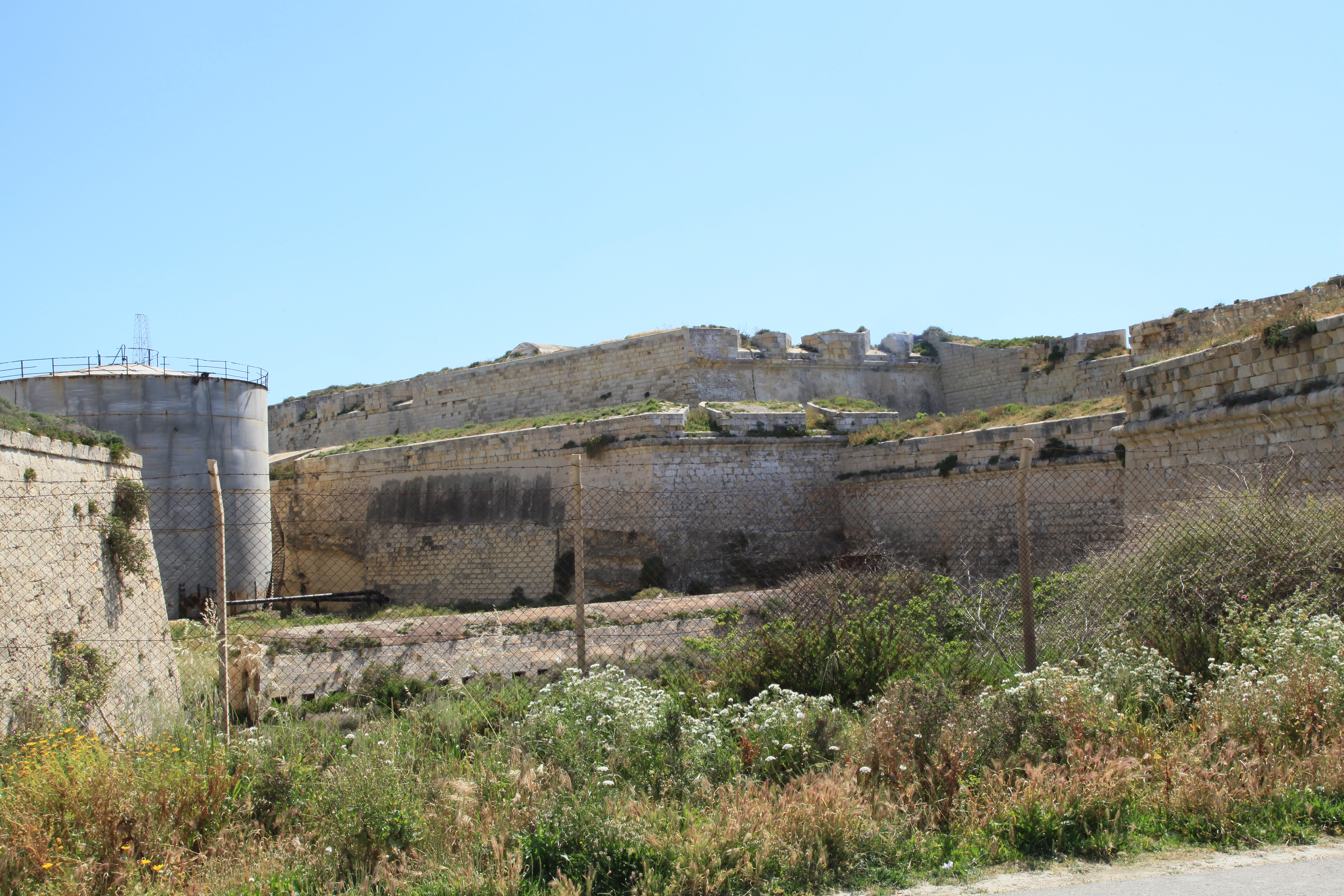
Land front of Fort Ricasoli

The mutiny broke out on 4 April 1807 while Lieutenant-Colonel Barnes was in Valletta. It involved 200 Greeks and Albanians who killed Lieutenant Schwartz, Captain De Wattville, Gunner John Johnstone, and several privates. They also wounded Major Schumelketel and three other officers. They removed the British flag and replaced it with the Russian ensign, closed the fort's gates, and raised the drawbridge. The mutineers took the regimental officers and their families hostage, and forced about 20 British artillerymen to aim the fort's guns and mortars at Valletta. The revolt was led by a Greco-Bulgarian named Caro Mitro.

Some men who had escaped from the fort informed the British of the mutiny. The Royal Maltese Regiment and the 39th (Dorsetshire) Regiment of Foot took positions on the glacis of the fort, while the guns of Fort Saint Elmo and Fort Saint Angelo were trained on Ricasoli. In a message, the mutineers demanded to be discharged and be sent home, with money and a pardon from Villettes. They threatened to open fire on Valletta, but Villettes refused their demands and ordered them to surrender.

On the second day, more guns were trained towards Ricasoli, but no further action was taken since Villettes intended to starve out the mutineers in a siege. A second message from the rebels demanded food and provisions, again threatening to bombard Valletta, but their demands were again ignored.

On the third day, the mutineers sent one of the hostages, an officer, to the British with a message from the mutineers, which was once again ignored. The officer told the British authorities of the conditions in the fort but had to return since his wife was still a hostage. Shortly afterwards, the rebels began fighting among themselves and a faction which was ready to surrender hoisted the white flag, but another faction took it down. Seeing there was disagreement among the rebels, Villettes sent a delegation to negotiate with the mutineers but they still refused to surrender.

On the fifth day, 8 April, the families of the officers held hostage were released since the mutineers were running out of food. The rebels sent an ultimatum threatening to destroy the fort unless provisions were sent. When it expired, they sent another in which they threatened to kill all the remaining hostages. Meanwhile, there was more infighting between the rebels and a group of Germans and Poles managed to open the gates of the fort. While most of the mutineers escaped and surrendered, twenty others remained inside behind the re-closed gates.

On 10 April, the remaining mutineers fired on Valletta, though they caused no injury. Villettes then ordered that the fort be stormed. A party of 40 men under Lieutenant de Clermont, who was himself part of the Froberg Regiment, scaled the fort and took control of it, taking no losses in the process. The fort fell but six rebels retreated into the gunpowder magazine, threatening to blow it up. After two days, they blew up the magazine's 600 barrels of gunpowder and killed three British sentries. In the ensuing confusion, the six rebels managed to escape to the countryside.

== Aftermath ==
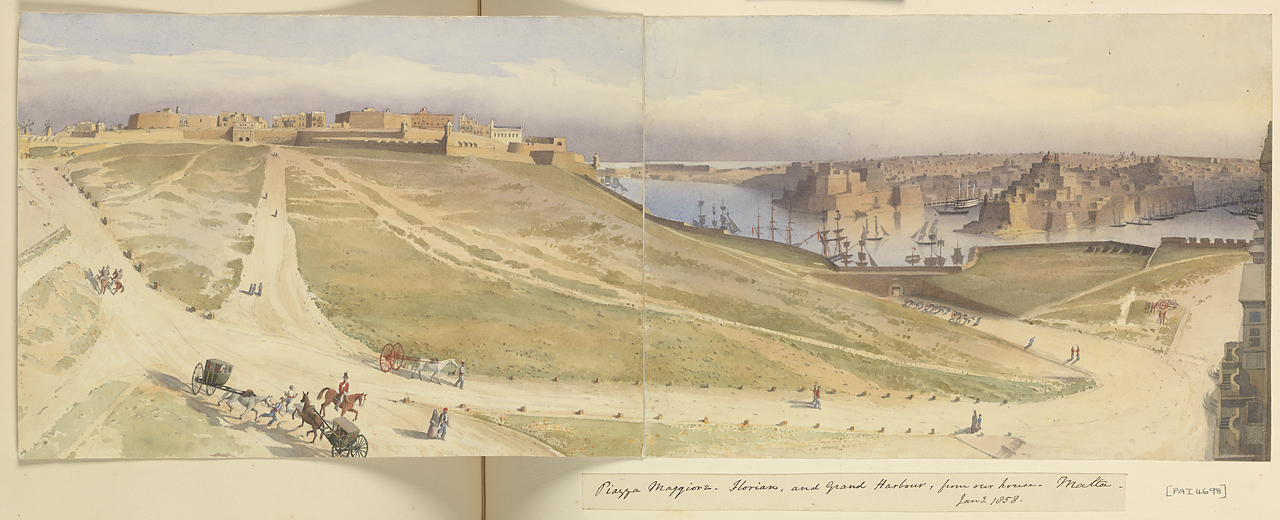
Floriana Parade Ground, where the rebel leaders were executed

Four of the six rebels who escaped after blowing up the magazine were captured after two days and were hanged immediately. Villettes put the ringleaders on trial: 24 or 25 were found guilty and condemned to death.

The executions were carried out at the Floriana Parade Ground in the presence of the rest of the Froberg Regiment, which was now imprisoned. The first fifteen mutineers were divided into three groups of five: each group was hanged by the following group. The last group was not hanged, but instead executed by firing squad with the remaining prisoners. Some did not die immediately and tried to escape, and although most were recaptured and executed, two ran away and died after jumping off the bastions. Meanwhile, the mutineers' leader Caro Mitro together with his friend Nicola d'Anastasi had managed to escape, but they were captured on 25 or 26 April by Maltese soldiers near Baħar iċ-Ċagħaq. They were hanged on the same day and were buried in a trench beneath the Bastioni della Salnitriera.

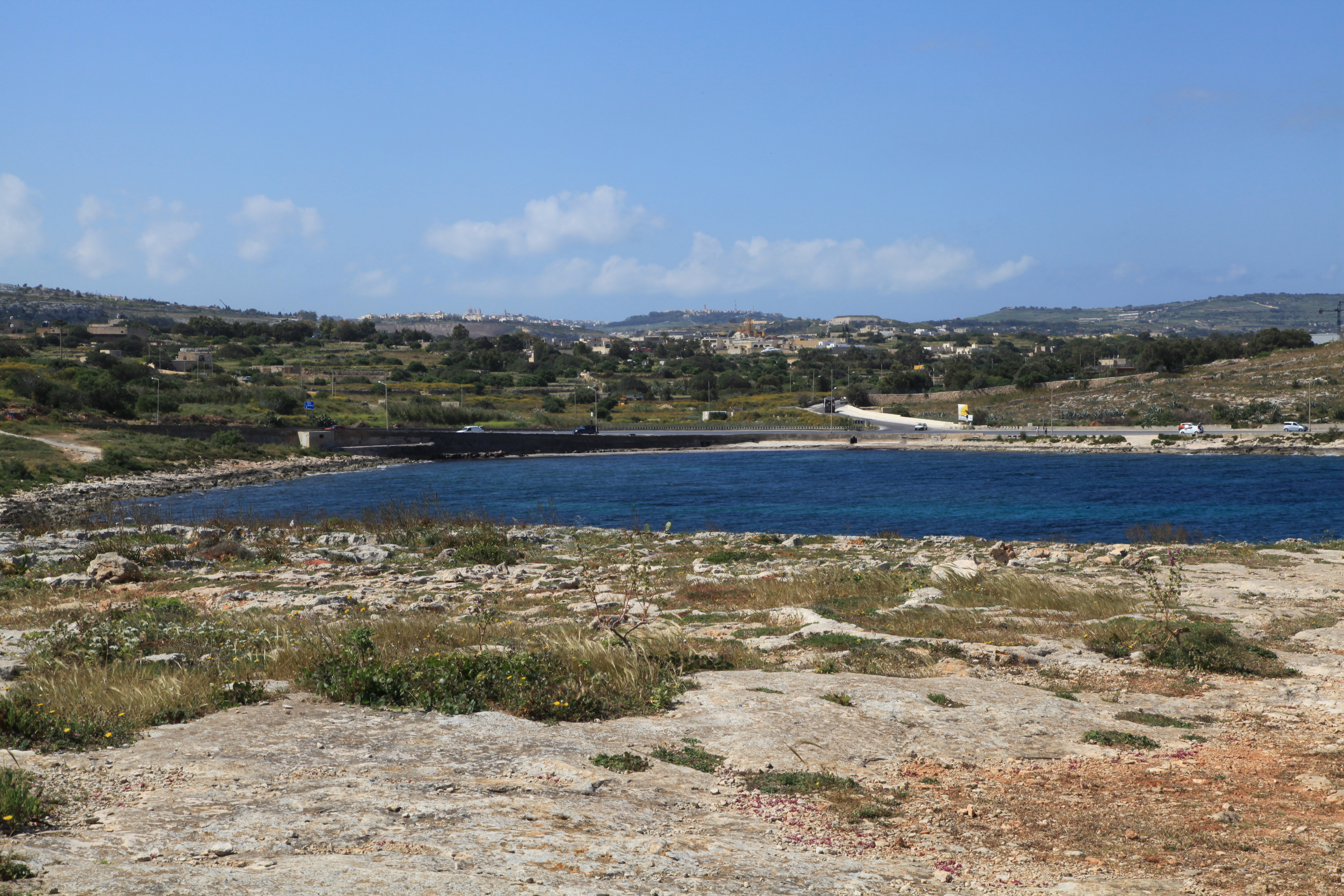
Qalet Marku, where the mutineers' leader Caro Mitro was captured on 25–26 April 1807

A board of inquiry was set up between 20 and 22 April, and their investigation uncovered the dubious recruiting of the regiment. They ordered it to be disbanded in June 1807. About 350 men were discharged and repatriated to the Balkans; others, who wanted to remain in British service, were reassigned to the regiments of De Roll, Chasseurs Britanniques, and De Watteville. The government also published an eight-page report about the mutiny, entitled Rapporto di quanto è accaduto nel Forte Ricasoli dalli 4 fino alli 11 d'Aprile 1807 (Report of what happened at Fort Ricasoli from 4 to 11 April 1807), which was probably written by Vittorio Barzoni.

Count Froberg (Gustave de Montjoie), the regiment's founder, was in Constantinople when he heard about the mutiny. He fled the city, knowing that his recruitment methods had been uncovered, but, according to Neale, a group of Cossacks captured him in a remote village and "literally cut [him] to pieces".

The fort itself was badly damaged; besides the magazine, most of St. Dominic Demi-Bastion had been destroyed. The damaged demi-bastion was never rebuilt to its original design, but repair works to the damaged parts of the fort cost over £4523. The fort was again badly damaged in World War II, and today it is in a dilapidated state and threatened by coastal erosion.

== In popular culture ==
- The Froberg mutiny serves as a backdrop to the 2013 book Ricasoli Soldier by Joe Scicluna.
