= Giovanni Francesco Ricasoli =

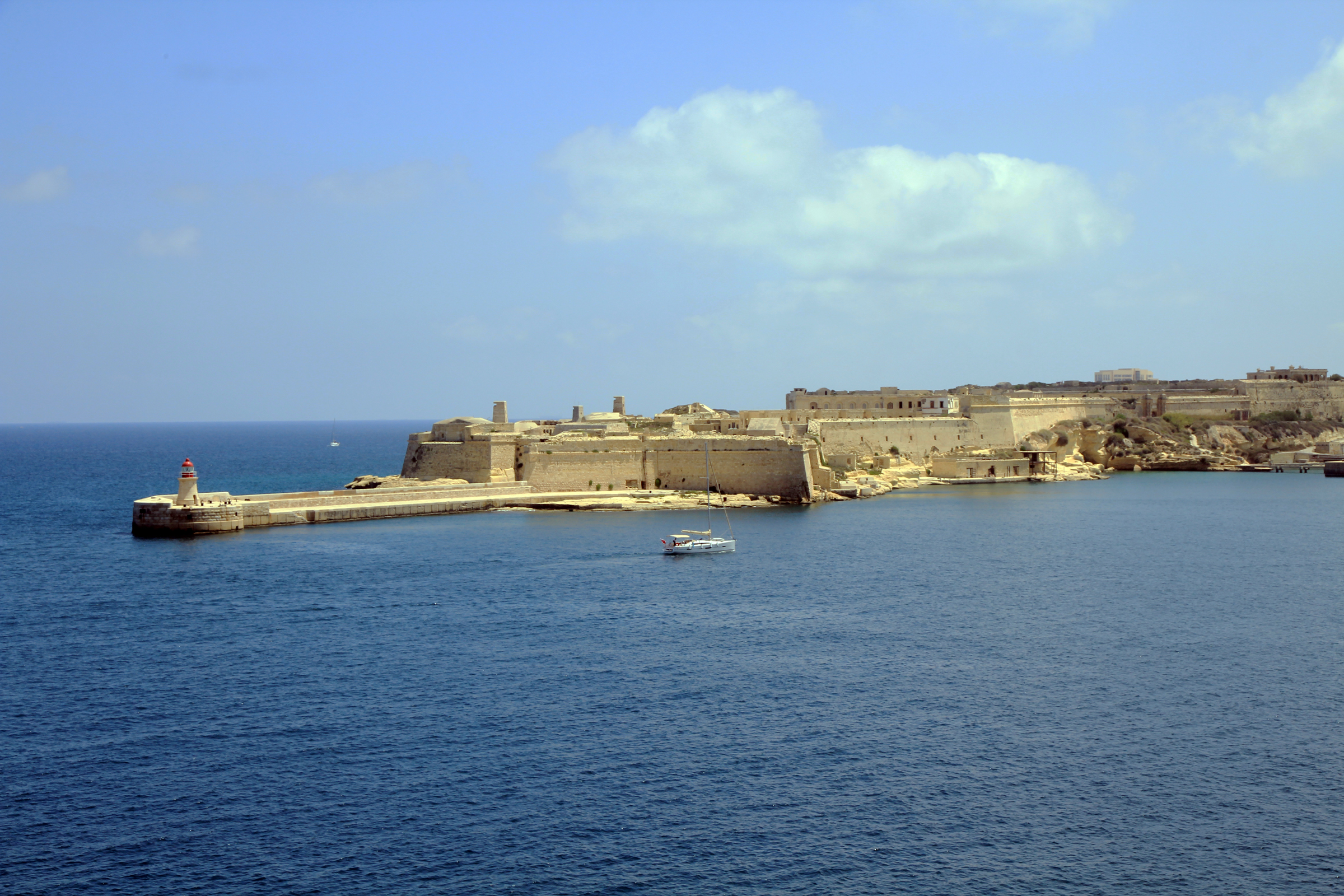
Fort Ricasoli

Fra Giovanni Francesco Ricasoli (died 26 July 1673) was a Florentine knight within the Langue of Italy of the Order of St. John of Jerusalem. He held several commands within the Order's navy, and is mostly known for being the namesake of Fort Ricasoli.

Ricasoli joined the Order of St. John in December 1618, as a page to Grand Master Alof de Wignacourt. In December 1640, he was given command of a galley within the Order's navy, and he commanded a number of other ships over the course of his career. He was involved in naval battles against the Barbary pirates and the Ottoman Empire a number of times, including during the Fifth Ottoman–Venetian War. Ricasoli became a Knight Grand Cross in June 1661.

In 1670, Ricasoli contributed 20,000 scudi for the construction of a fort near the entrance of Malta's Grand Harbour, which was named Fort Ricasoli in his honour. The fort was completed in 1698, and it cost over 100,000 scudi to build.

Ricasoli died on 26 July 1673. He is buried at St. John's Co-Cathedral in Valletta, Malta.
