= Fort Ricasoli =

Historic fort on Malta

- Forti Rikażli
- Kalkara, Malta
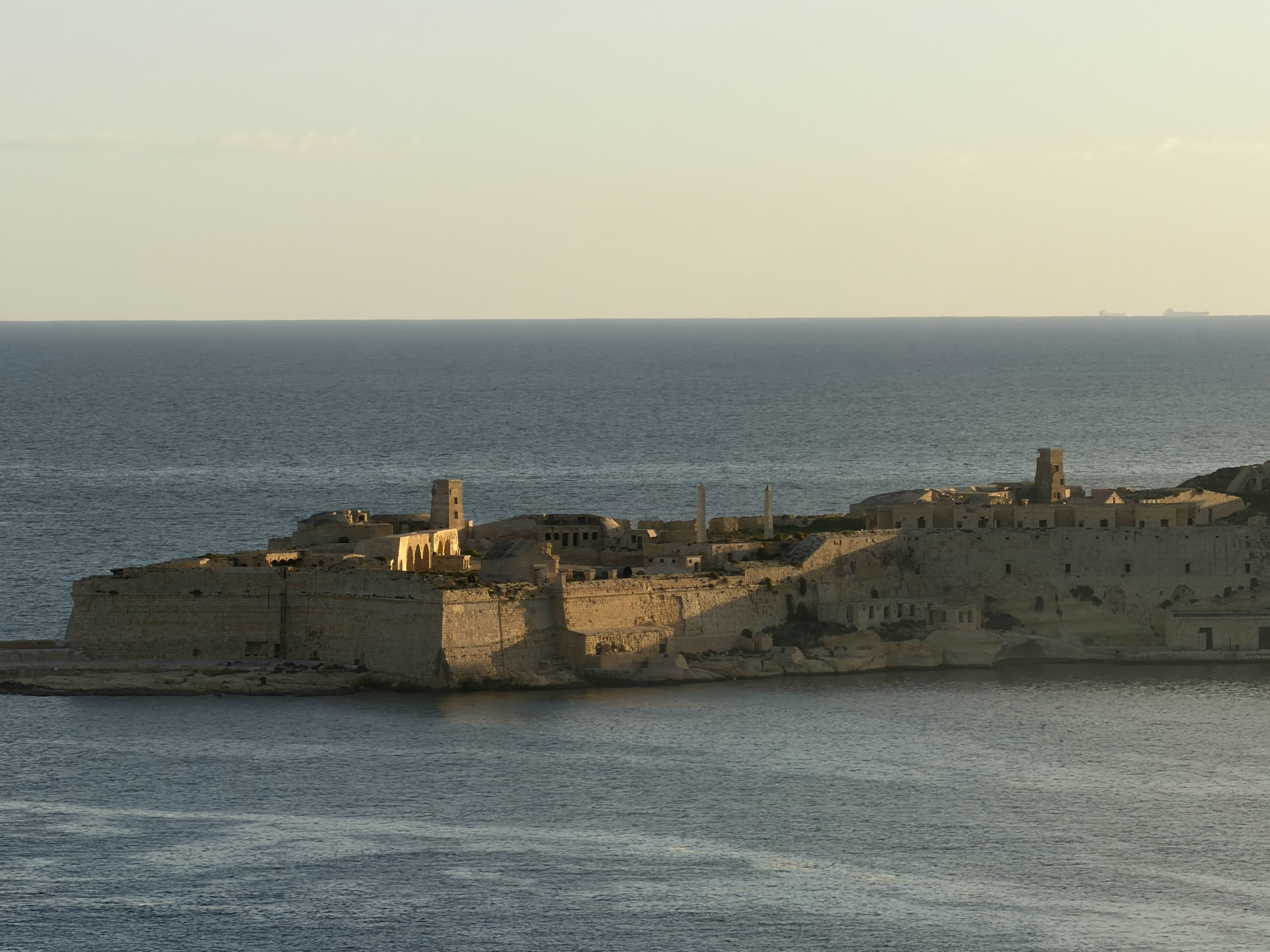
- View of Fort Ricasoli from Valletta

Site information
- Type: Bastioned fort
- Owner: Government of Malta
- Controlled by: Malta Film Commission; Waste Oils Co. Ltd.
- Open to the public: No
- Condition: Mostly intact but dilapidated

Location
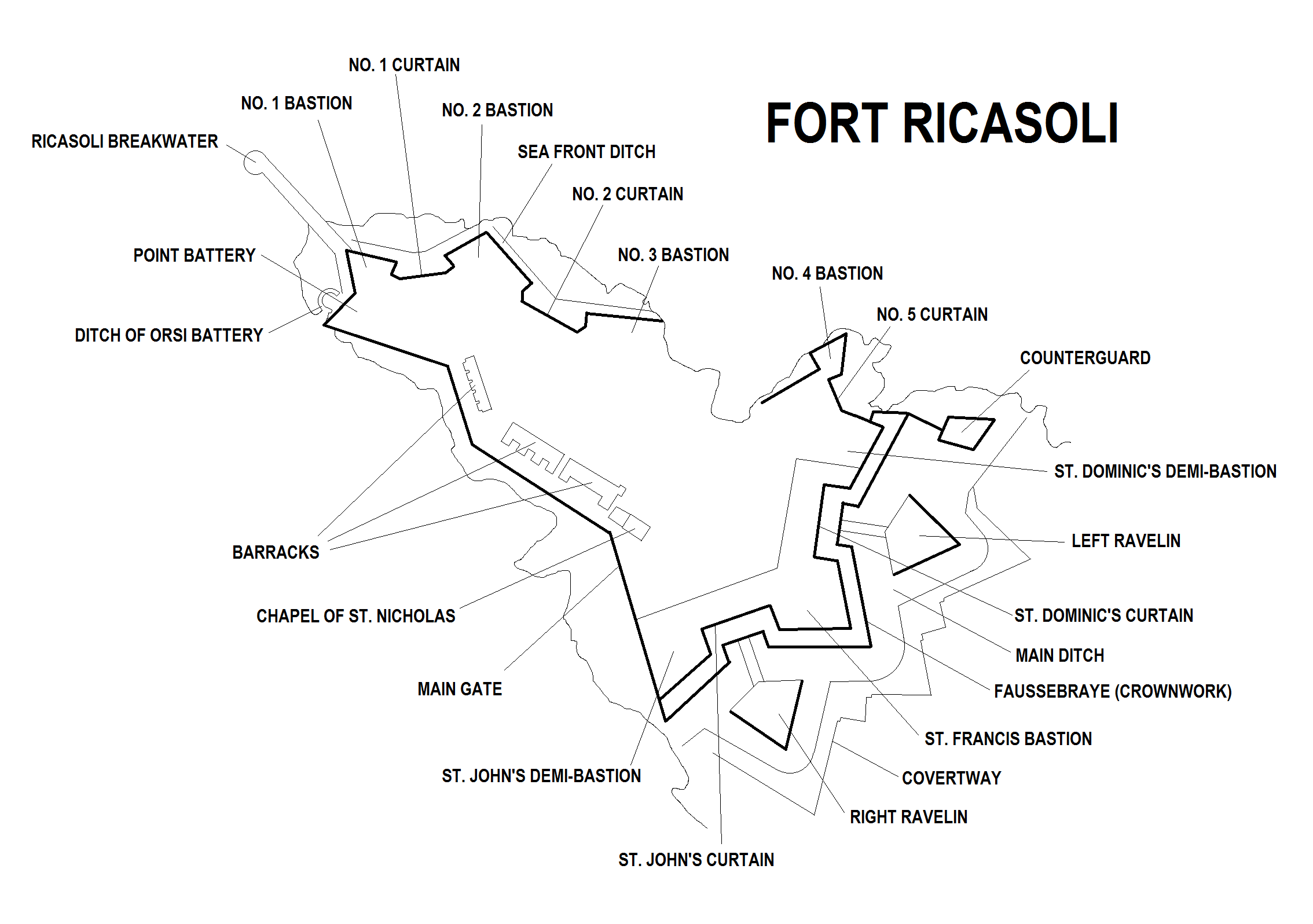
- Map of Fort Ricasoli
- Coordinates: 35°53′51″N 14°31′33″E
- Area: 83,800 m^{2} (902,000 sq ft)
- Height: up to 20 m (66 ft)

Site history
- Built: 1670–1698
- Built by: Order of Saint John
- In use: 1674–1964
- Materials: Limestone
- Battles/wars: French invasion of Malta (1798); Siege of Malta (1798–1800); World War II
- Events: Froberg mutiny

Fort Ricasoli (Maltese: Forti Rikażli) is a bastioned fort in Kalkara, Malta, which was built by the Order of Saint John between 1670 and 1698. The fort occupies a promontory known as Gallows' Point and the north shore of Rinella Bay, commanding the entrance to the Grand Harbour along with Fort Saint Elmo. It is the largest fort in Malta and has been on the tentative list of UNESCO World Heritage Sites since 1998, as part of the Knights' Fortifications around the Harbours of Malta.

Fort Ricasoli saw use during the French invasion of Malta in 1798 and the subsequent Maltese insurrection, after which it ended up in British hands. Ricasoli was the site of the Froberg mutiny in 1807, and was also used as a military hospital during the 19th century. It saw use once again in World War II, when parts of it were destroyed by aerial bombardment. After it was decommissioned in the 1960s, the fort was used for industrial purposes. Today, the fort remains mostly intact but in a dilapidated state, and it is used as a filming location and a tank cleaning facility. Plans to restore the fort were approved in June 2019.

== Hospitaller rule ==
=== Background ===
Fort Ricasoli stands on the easternmost peninsula on the east side of the Grand Harbour. The promontory was originally known as Rinella Point or Punta Sottile (Maltese: Ponta Irqiqa). In 1531, two leaders of a slave rebellion and ten others who took a prominent role, who had tried to take over Fort St. Angelo and escape from Malta, were tortured and then hanged on the peninsula, which became known as Gallows' Point (Maltese: Ponta tal-Forka) afterwards. During the Great Siege of Malta in 1565, the Ottomans built an artillery battery on the peninsula in order to bombard Fort St. Elmo.

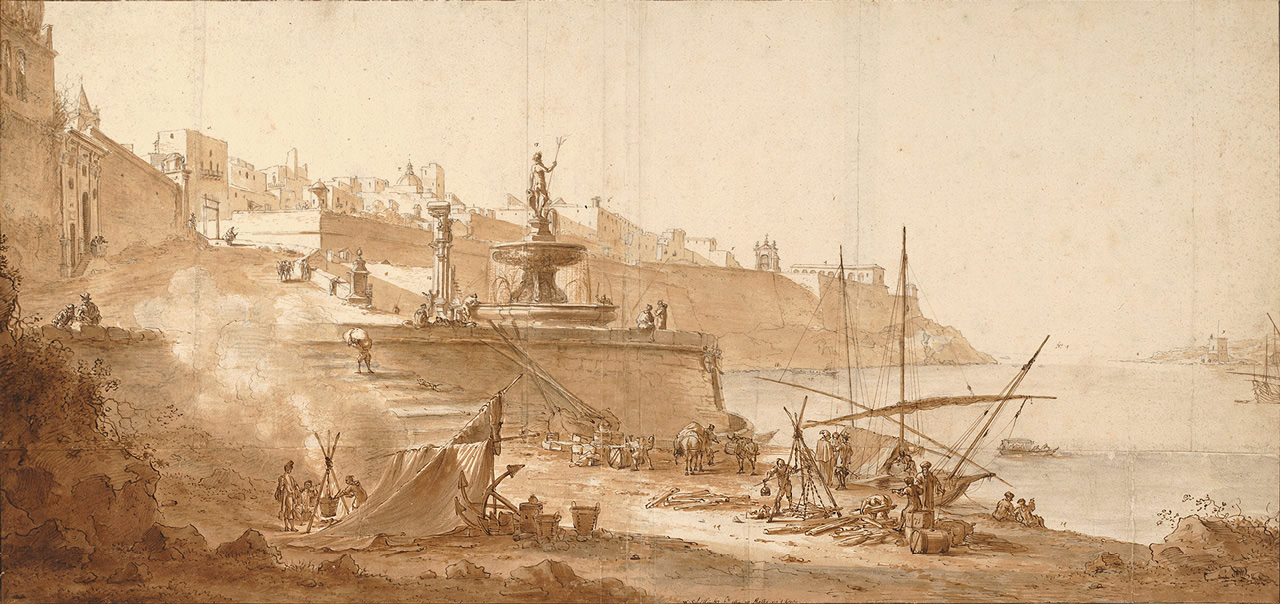
A 1664 sketch of the Grand Harbour by Willem Schellinks, with Orsi Tower and battery on the extreme right

A small semi-circular battery which was known as San Petronio Battery, and later as Orsi battery, was built at Gallows' Point in 1602. On 18 January 1629, the Italian knight Alessandro Orsi financed the construction of a tower near the battery. It was officially called Torre San Petronio, but it was commonly known as Orsi Tower or Torri Teftef by the locals. The name San Petronio was chosen during the rule of Grandmaster de Paola, and the name dell’Orso became much popular after the renovation of the battery itself apart from the building of the tower. It was also known as Torre De Falcha (Tower of the Gallows) in historic documents. Its exterior was plastered and painted with yellow ochre. The tower was designed by Bartolomeo Ganga. At this point the peninsula became known as Punta dell'Orso.

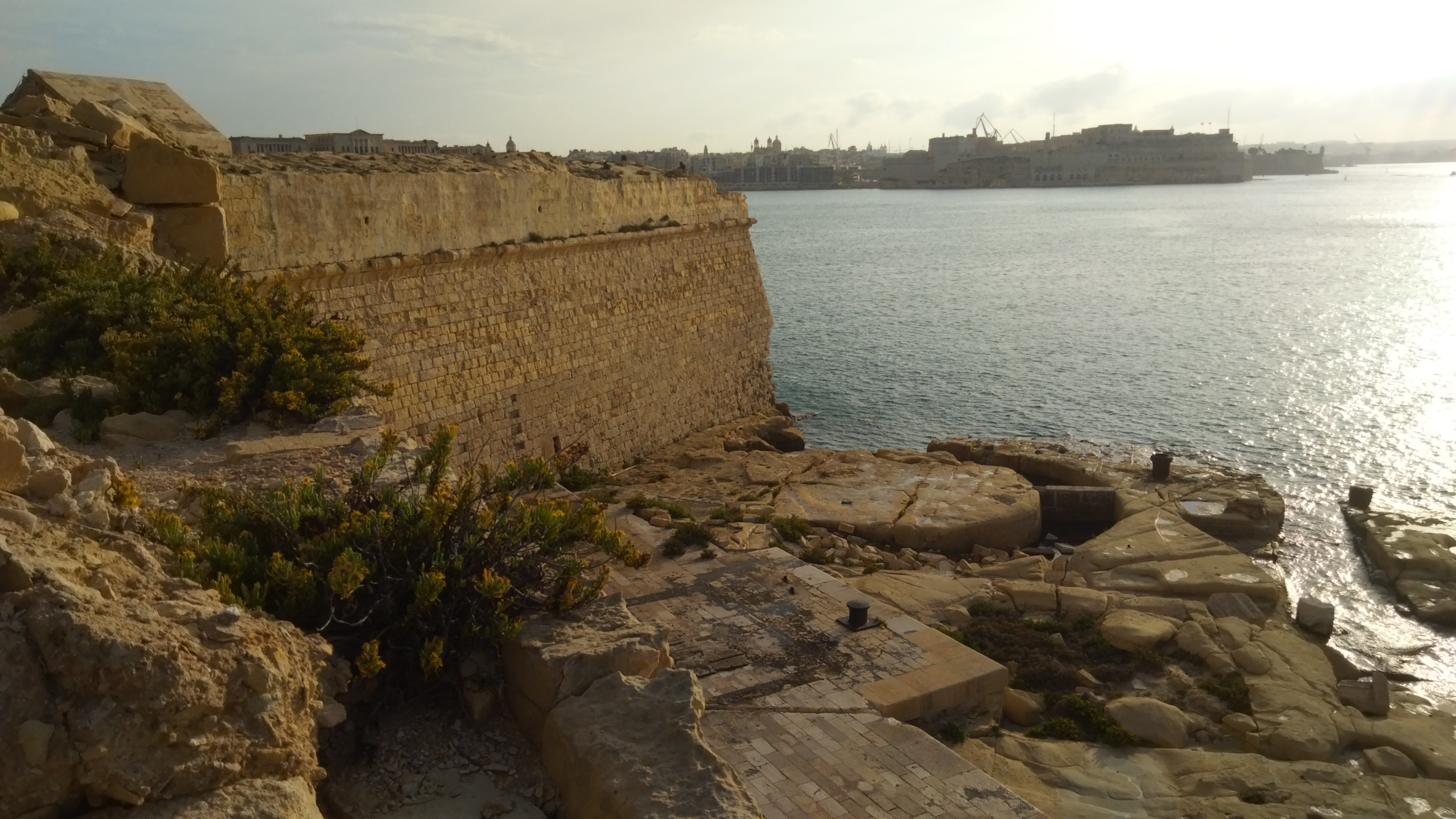
Orsi ditch (bottom) and Fort Ricasoli (left)

The tower was built to prevent the escape of slaves from the island. The tower and battery were protected by a sea-filled ditch and a drawbridge. The tower and battery are visible in the distance in a 1664 drawing of the Grand Harbour by Willem Schellinks. They remained standing until they were destroyed by waves in a storm on 8 February 1821, and today only the rock-hewn ditch of the battery remains.

In 1644, Giovanni de’ Medici proposed that Fort St. Angelo in Birgu be abandoned and a new fort be constructed on Orsi Point. The new fort would have been also called Fort St. Angelo, and would be manned with the garrison of the old fort. He drew up plans for the proposed fort, but they were never implemented.

=== Construction and modifications ===
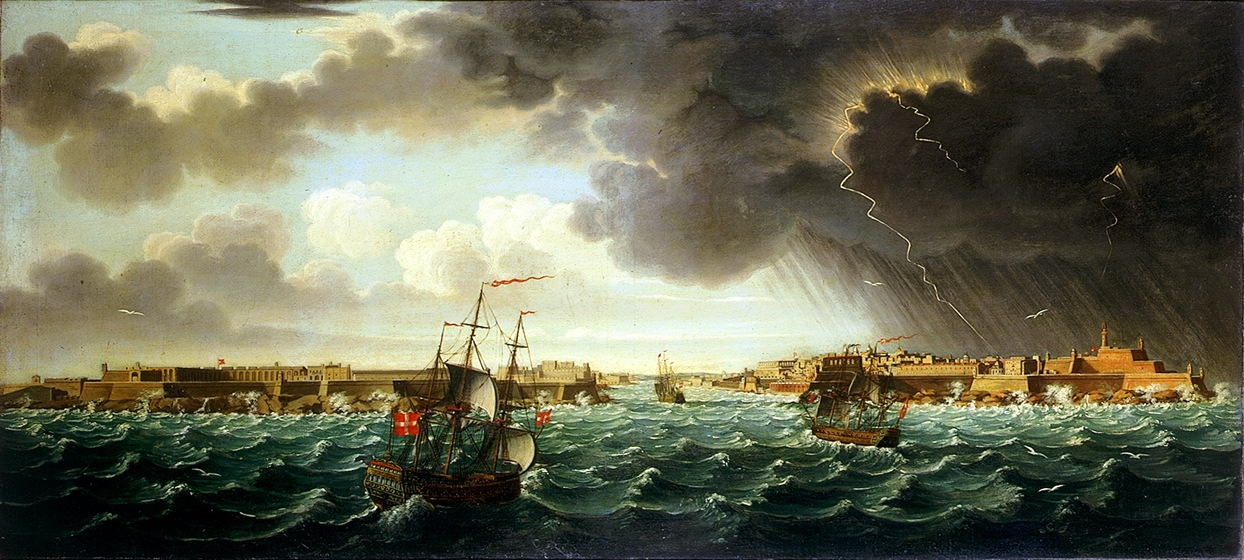
Painting showing the entrance to Malta's Grand Harbour in c. 1750, with Fort Ricasoli on the left and Fort Saint Elmo on the right

In 1669, fears of an Ottoman attack rose after the fall of Candia, and the following year Grand Master Nicolas Cotoner invited Antonio Maurizio Valperga, the military engineer of the House of Savoy, to improve Malta's fortifications. Valperga designed a new fort to be built on the headland, and despite some criticism from within the order, the decision was eventually approved. The Florentine knight Fra Giovanni Francesco Ricasoli donated 20,000 scudi to construct the fort, and it was named in his honour. The first stone was laid down on 15 June 1670, and the initial stages of construction were supervised by Valperga himself. The fort received a skeleton garrison in June 1674, although it was still incomplete. In 1681, the Flemish engineer Carlos de Grunenbergh proposed some changes to the design of the fort, and these recommendations were implemented. The barracks, chapel and other buildings within the fort were constructed in the 1680s and 1690s, and the fort was officially declared complete and armed in May 1698.

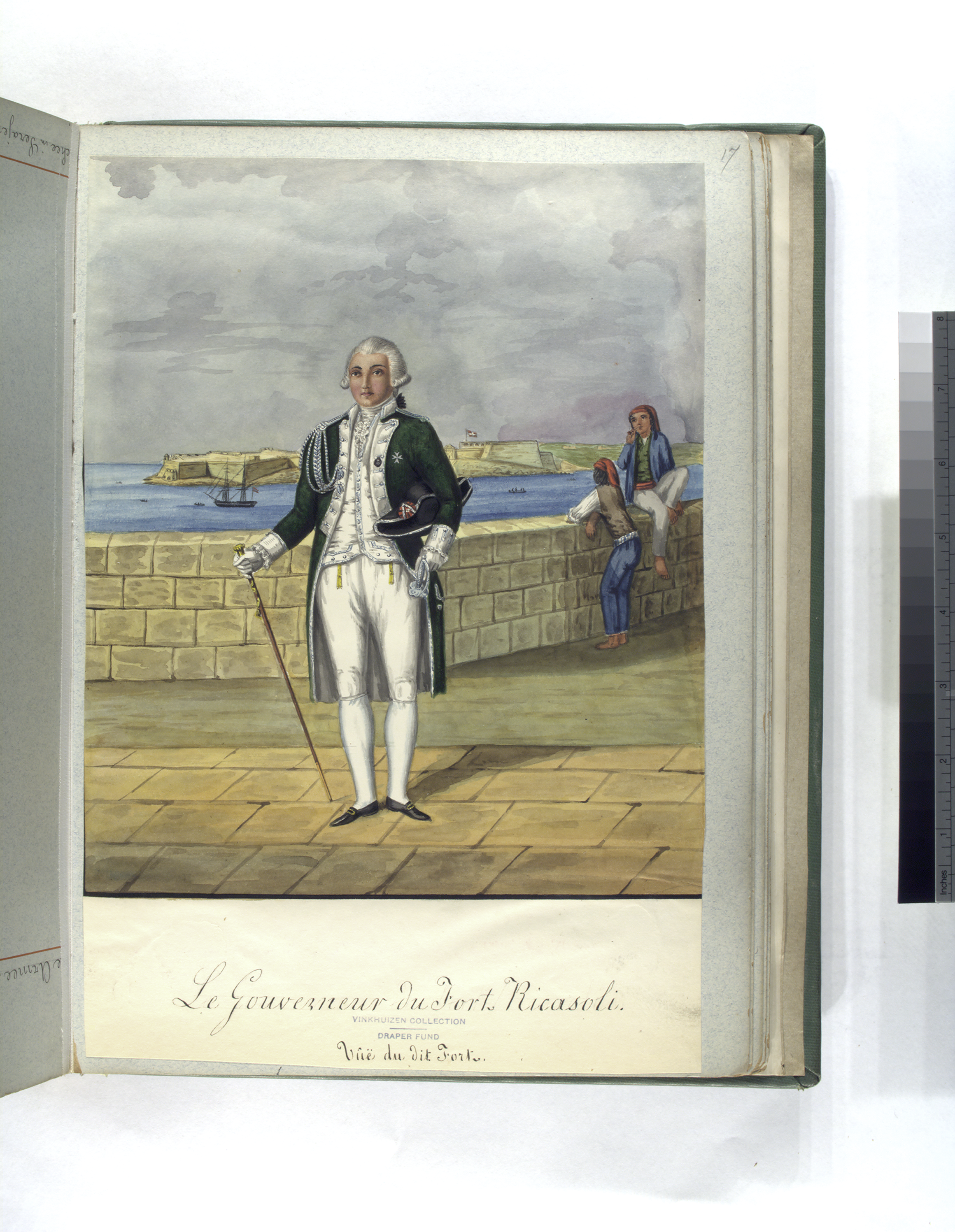
18th-century painting of the Hospitaller Governor of Fort Ricasoli, with the fort itself in the background

In 1714, the French engineers Jacop de Puigirand de Tigné, Charles François de Mondion and Philippe de Vendôme criticized the small size of the fort's bastions, which they deemed ineffective. De Tigné proposed a number of alterations, including repairing the existing parapets and embrasures, as well as constructing a retrenchment within the fort. Vendôme proposed the construction of a canal separating the fort from the mainland. In 1722, the repairs proposed by de Tigné were implemented, although the retrenchment and canal were never built due to a lack of funds. The fort was in a bad state by the mid-18th century, and some maintenance work was done in 1761.

In 1785, Ricasoli was armed with eighty cannons, including forty-one 24-pounders, making it the most heavily armed fort in Malta. Parts of the fort's enceinte were rebuilt under the direction of Antoine Étienne de Tousard in the 1790s.

The fort was also used as a prison prior to the construction of the Corradino Correctional Facility.

== French occupation ==
Fort Ricasoli saw use during the French invasion of Malta in June 1798, during the French Revolutionary Wars. At the time, it was commanded by the Bali de Tillet, and was garrisoned by the Cacciatori, who were a volunteer chasseur light infantry regiment. The fort repelled three French attacks, before surrendering after Grand Master Hompesch officially capitulated to Napoleon.

In the subsequent Maltese uprising and blockade, the fort remained in French hands. It continually fired at the insurgents' San Rocco Battery, which was located about 700 m (2,300 ft) away.

== British rule ==
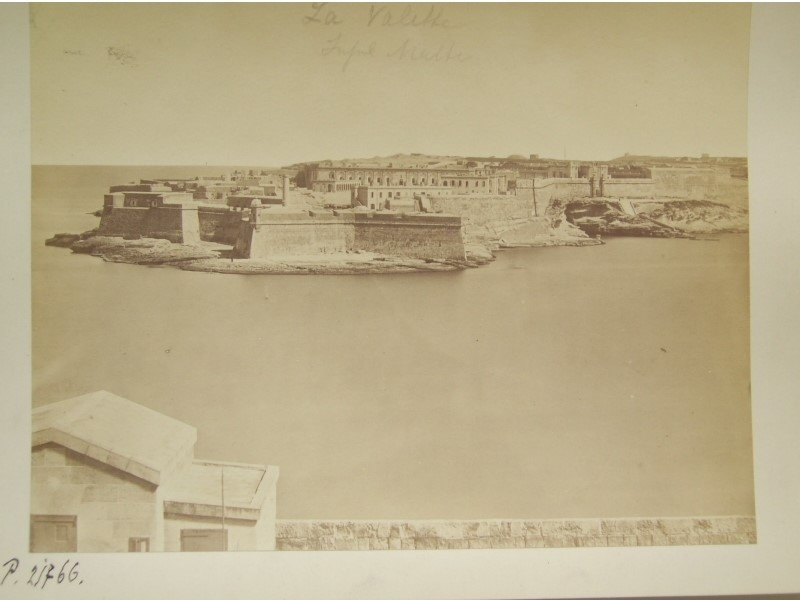
Photo of Fort Ricasoli from the late 19th or early 20th century

The fort continued to be an active military installation throughout the British period. It was the scene of a mutiny in 1807 when Albanian soldiers of the Froberg Regiment revolted and shut themselves up in Fort Ricasoli. Despite attempts at negotiation they eventually blew up the main gunpowder magazine, causing extensive damage to the fort in the process. The mutiny was quashed by loyal troops, and some of the mutineers were condemned to death by court martial. The damaged parts of the fort were repaired, but were not rebuilt to their original design. A new magazine was built in 1829 to replace the one destroyed in the mutiny.

The fort was also used as a temporary naval hospital in the late 1820s and early 1830s, before Bighi Hospital was opened. During the cholera epidemic of 1837, patients who had contracted the disease at the Ospizio in Floriana were transferred to Ricasoli. Most of them died within a few days, and they were buried within the nearby Wied Għammieq cemetery. Another cholera epidemic broke out at Ricasoli in 1865.

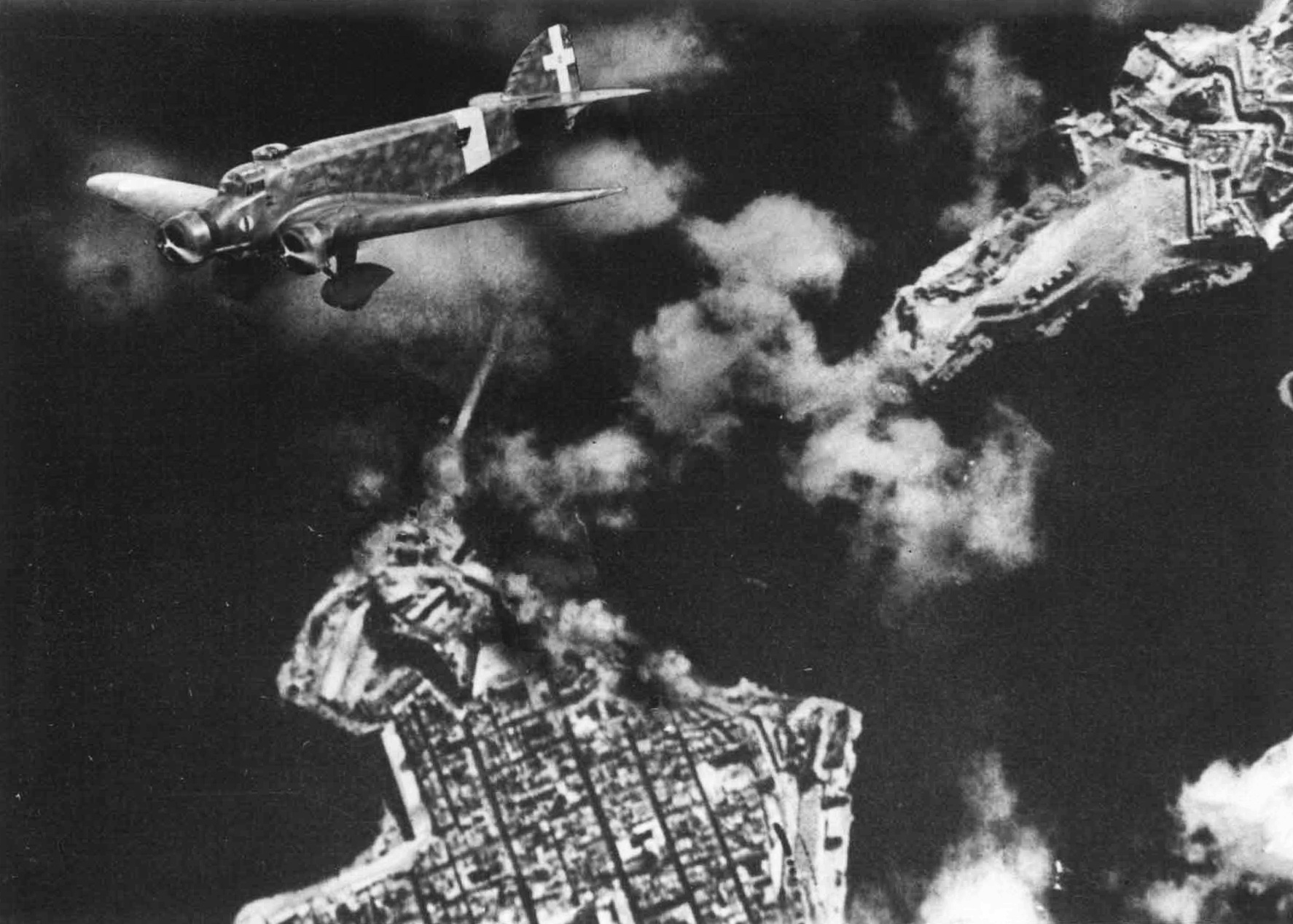
An Italian plane bombing the Grand Harbour in 1941, with Ricasoli visible at the top right. This appears to be a composite of two photographs.

In 1844, the fort was manned by 500 men. In 1848, Sir John Fox Burgoyne inspected Malta's fortifications, and considered Ricasoli as "impregnable". In the 1850s, artillery of a higher calibre was introduced to the fort, and the guns were replaced a number of times over the following decades. The seaward enceinte had been completely overhauled by 1878, and by the 1900s, new gun emplacements, searchlights and a torpedo station had been installed. In the 1930s, concrete fire control towers were built on No. 2, No. 3 and No. 4 bastions, and further searchlights were installed.

Fort Ricasoli was active in the defence of Malta during World War II, and on 26 July 1941, its guns helped repel an Italian attack on the Grand Harbour. In April 1942, the gate and Governor's House were destroyed by German aerial bombardment. After the war, the fort was commissioned as HMS Ricasoli between 1947 and 1958, and was used as a naval barracks. In 1958, the gate was rebuilt, although the design was slightly different from the original. The Governor's House was never reconstructed, mainly for financial reasons. In 1949, the lighthouse close to the fort was damaged due to bad weather. In 1964, the Admiralty transferred control of the fort to the government of Malta.

== Recent history ==
=== Industrial use ===
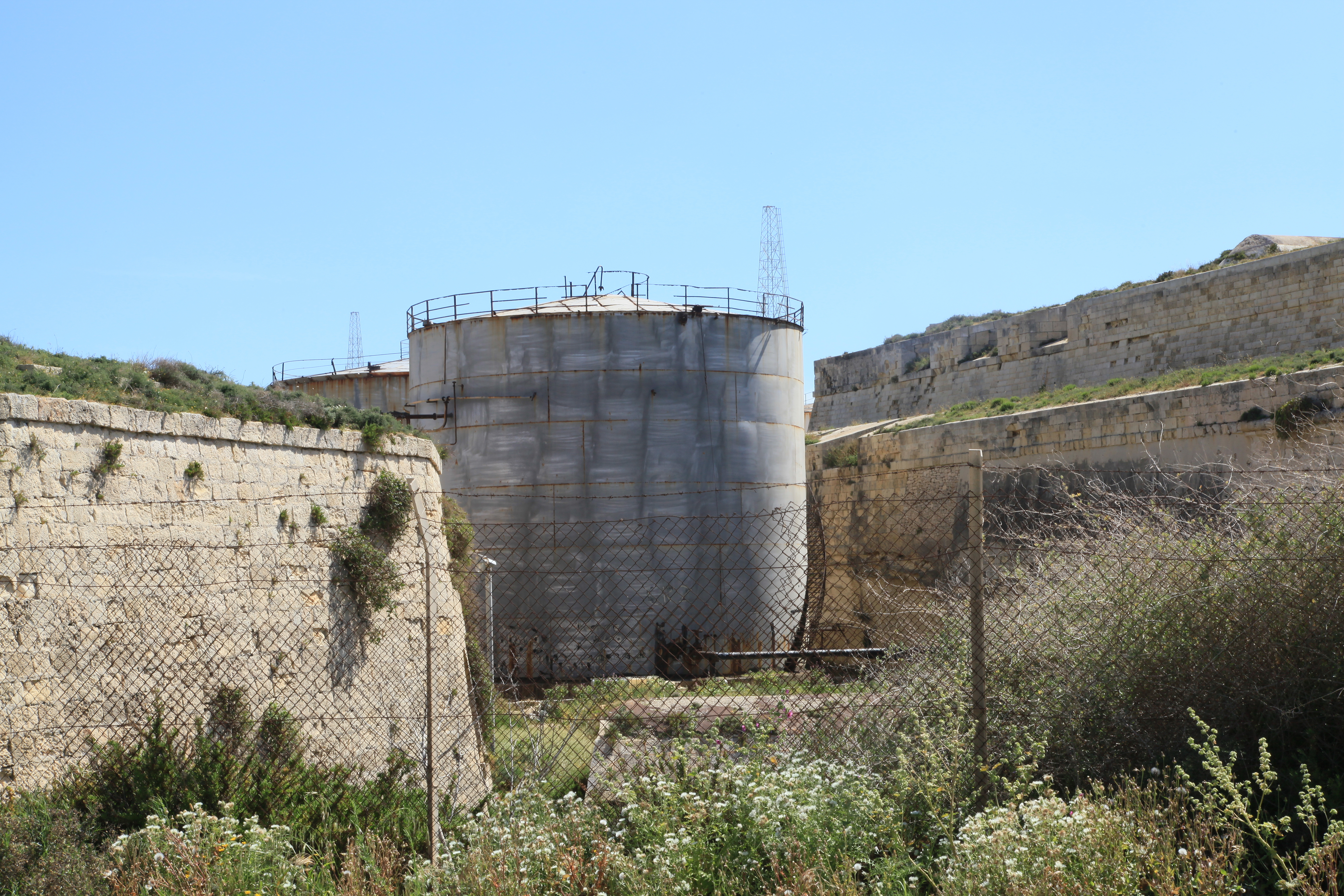
Oil tanks at Ricasoli

After the fort was handed over to the Maltese government, it was initially abandoned but it later became a container depot for raw material arriving in Malta. In 1976, part of the ditch near the Left Ravelin was filled in, and St. Dominic Demi-Bastion was breached to make way for a new road.

In 1964, the fort's ditch became a tank cleaning farm for the Malta Drydocks. The depot, which is known as Ricasoli Tank Cleaning Facilities, treats liquid waste from ships arriving in the Grand Harbour and removes oil and other chemicals prior to releasing the waste into the sea. The facility was privatized in 2012, and it is currently under the management of Waste Oils Co. Ltd.

The area around the fort eventually became an industrial park, which was known as Ricasoli Industrial Estate after the fort. The industrial estate was demolished in 2007 to make way for SmartCity Malta.

=== Filming location ===
Most of the fort is leased to the Malta Film Commission, and it has been used extensively as a location for various films and serials. In recent years, huge sets were built within its walls for the films Cutthroat Island (1995), Gladiator (2000), Troy (2004), Agora (2009), The Last Voyage of the Demeter (2023) and Napoleon (2023). In these films, the fort stood in as Port Royal, Rome, Troy, Alexandria, Varna and Toulon respectively. The fort was also used in the filming of Assassin's Creed (2016) and Entebbe (2018).

The TV miniseries Julius Caesar (2002) and Helen of Troy (2003) were also partially filmed at Fort Ricasoli. A set dubbed as the Roman Road was built for Julius Caesar and this has been retained and used for other films.

The first season of HBO's adaptation of George R. R. Martin's Game of Thrones used various parts of the fort to represent the Red Keep.

=== Present condition ===
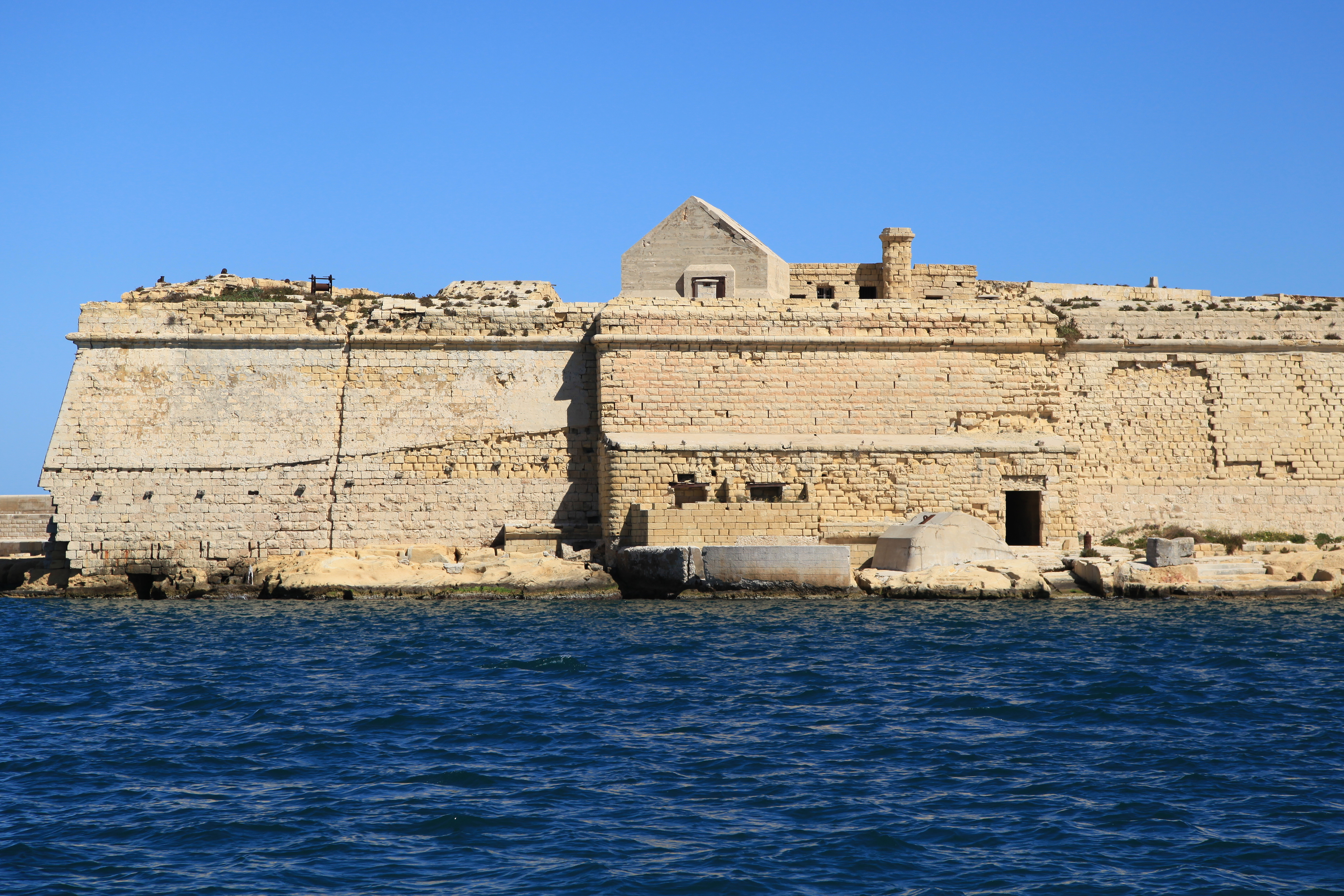
View of Fort Ricasoli in 2013 showing damage caused by erosion

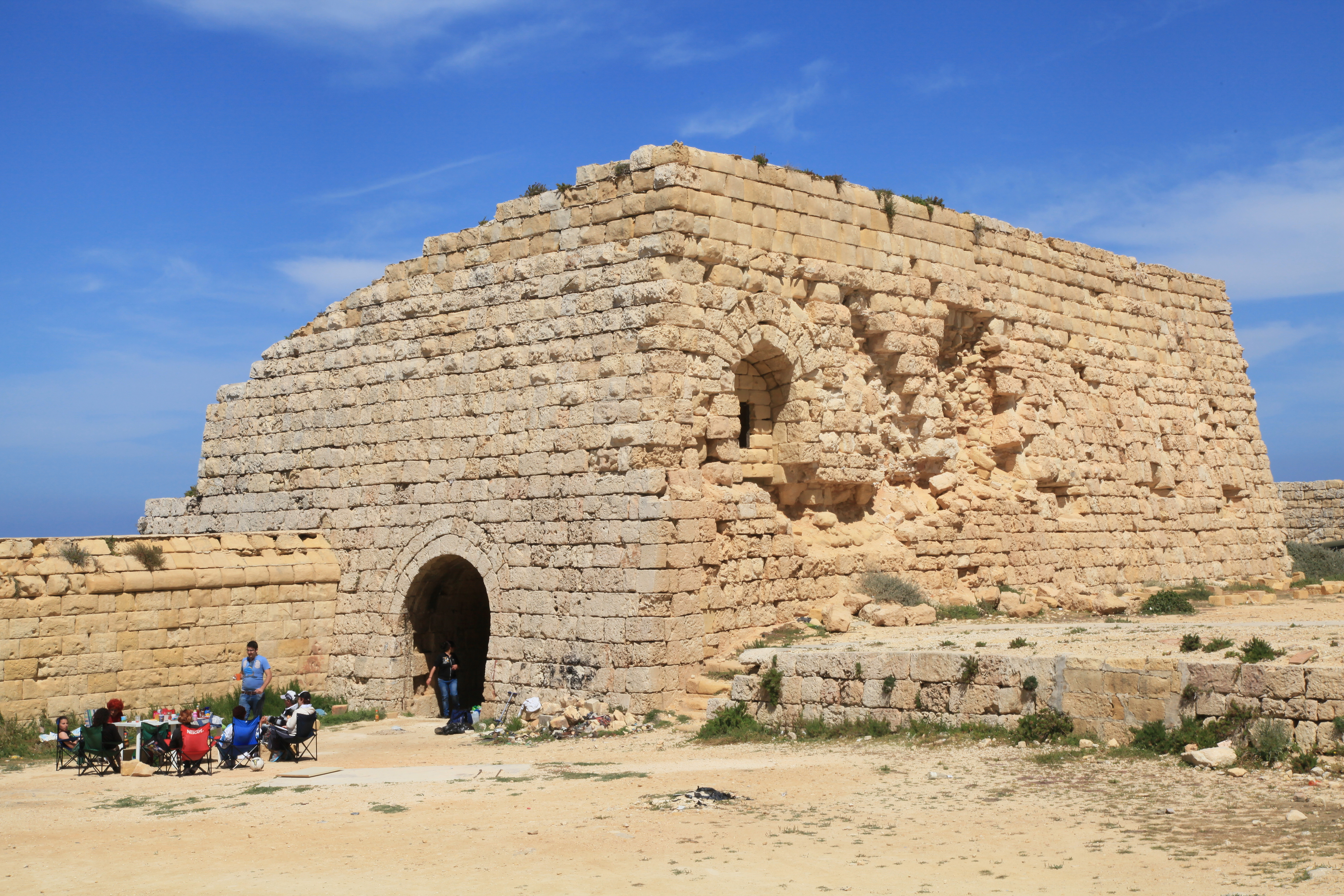
St. Dominic Counterguard, which has partially collapsed

Today, Fort Ricasoli remains largely intact, although it is in a dilapidated state. The headland that it is built upon is prone to coastal erosion, and some of the walls between No. 3 and No. 4 bastions have already collapsed into the sea. In 2004, the Restoration Unit of the Ministry of Resources and Infrastructure removed, restored and re-attached part of the fort's walls, but nothing has been done to restore the entire fort.

In May 2015, the Democratic Alternative and some NGOs suggested that the campus of the proposed American University of Malta should be split up between Fort Ricasoli and the nearby Fort Saint Rocco and Fort San Salvatore. This proposal was not implemented, as the campus is to be split up between Dock No. 1 in Cospicua and Żonqor Point in Marsaskala.

By 2018, heritage NGOs had made repeated calls for the fort to be restored. Some works meant to attract more film productions began in early 2019, and plans for extensive restoration works (originally submitted to the Planning Authority in 2013) were approved in June 2019. This move was welcomed by NGOs.

== Layout ==
Fort Ricasoli has an irregular plan following the coastline of the peninsula it is built upon. The fort consists of a bastioned land front and its outworks, an enceinte facing the sea, and a tenaille trace facing Rinella Bay of the Grand Harbour.

=== Land front ===
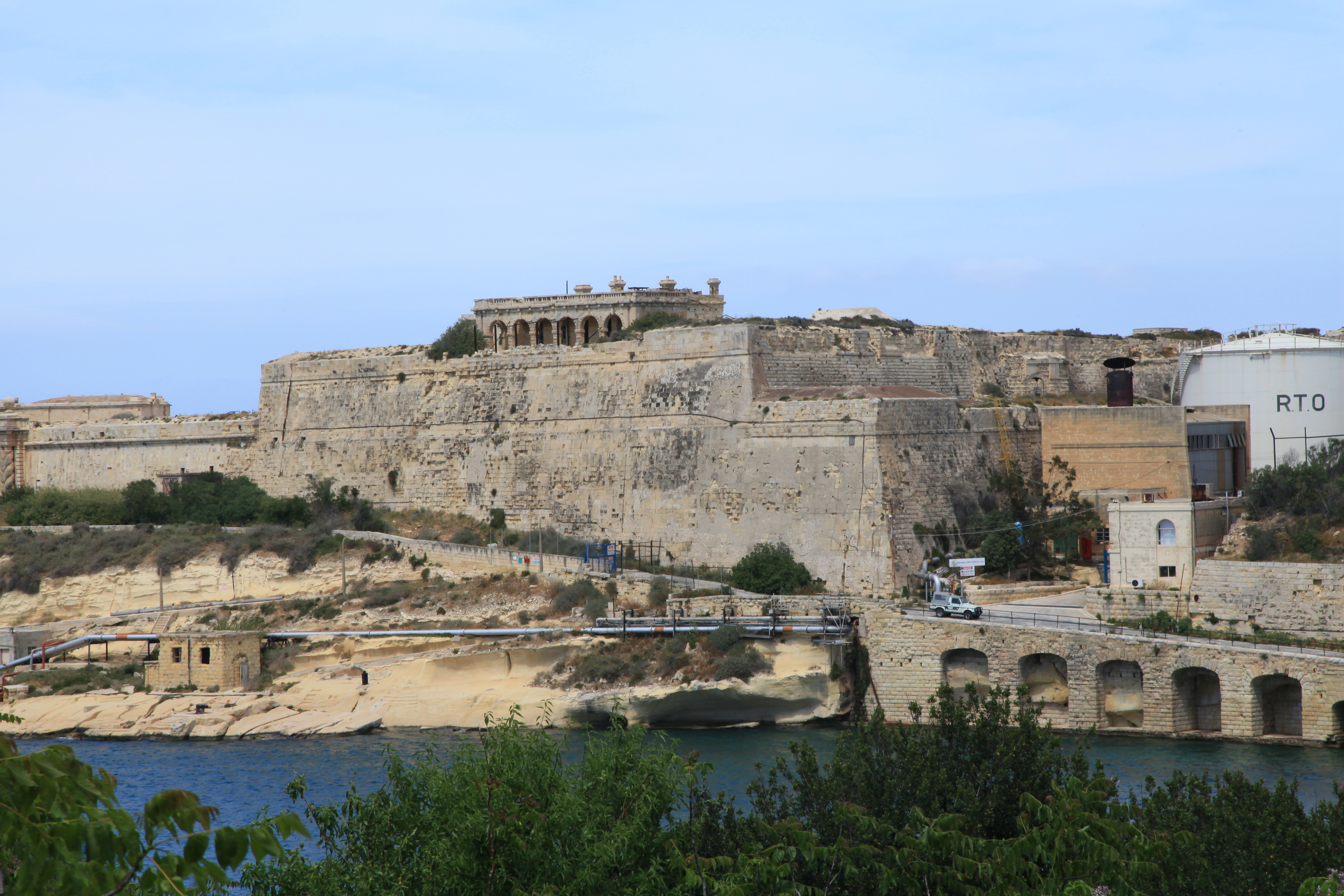
St. John's Demi-Bastion

The land front consists of the following bastions and demi-bastions, which are linked together by curtain walls:

- St. Dominic's Demi-Bastion, also known as Left Demi-Bastion or No. 5 Bastion – the demi-bastion at the northern end of the land front. It was damaged during the Froberg mutiny of 1807, when its magazine was blown up.
- St. Francis Bastion, also known as Central Bastion or No. 6 Bastion – a pentagonal bastion at the centre of the land front. It contains a traverse and a covered abris.
- St. John's Demi-Bastion, also known as Right Demi-Bastion or No. 7 Bastion – the demi-bastion at the southern end of the land front.

The land front contains casemates, which were used as barracks.

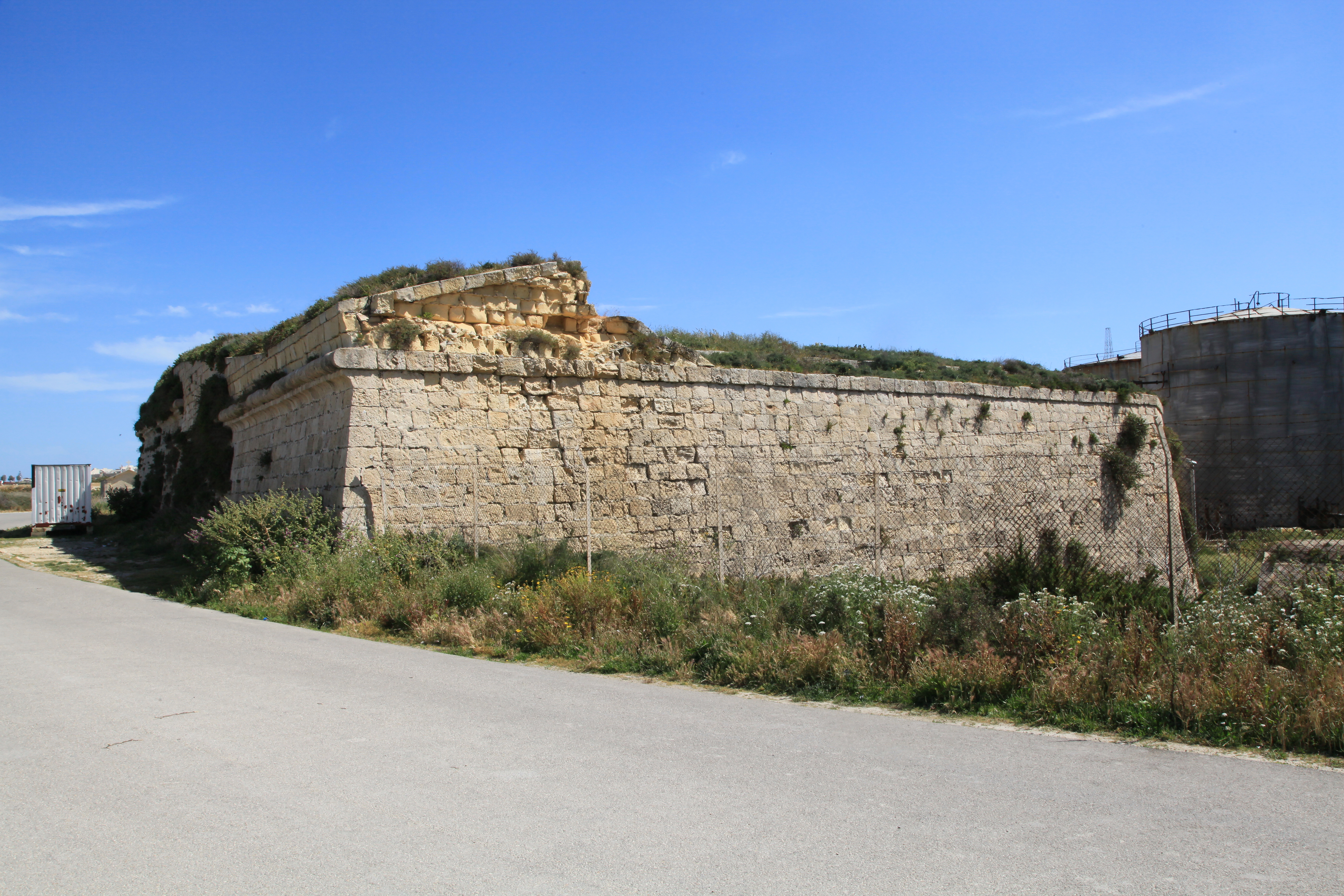
Left Ravelin

The land front is further protected by the following outworks:

- a faussebraye in the form of a crownwork encircling the entire land front.
- St. Dominic Counterguard – a casemated counterguard near the left extremity of the land front. It was heavily damaged by the action of seawater, with half of the structure having collapsed.
- two triangular ravelins between the St. Francis Bastion and either of the demi-bastions. The Left Ravelin contains a 6-inch (152mm) breech-loading (BL) gun emplacement.
- two caponiers leading from the land front to each of the ravelins. Extensive modifications were made to their structures by the British.

The outworks are surrounded by a ditch, a covertway and a glacis.

=== Sea front enceinte ===
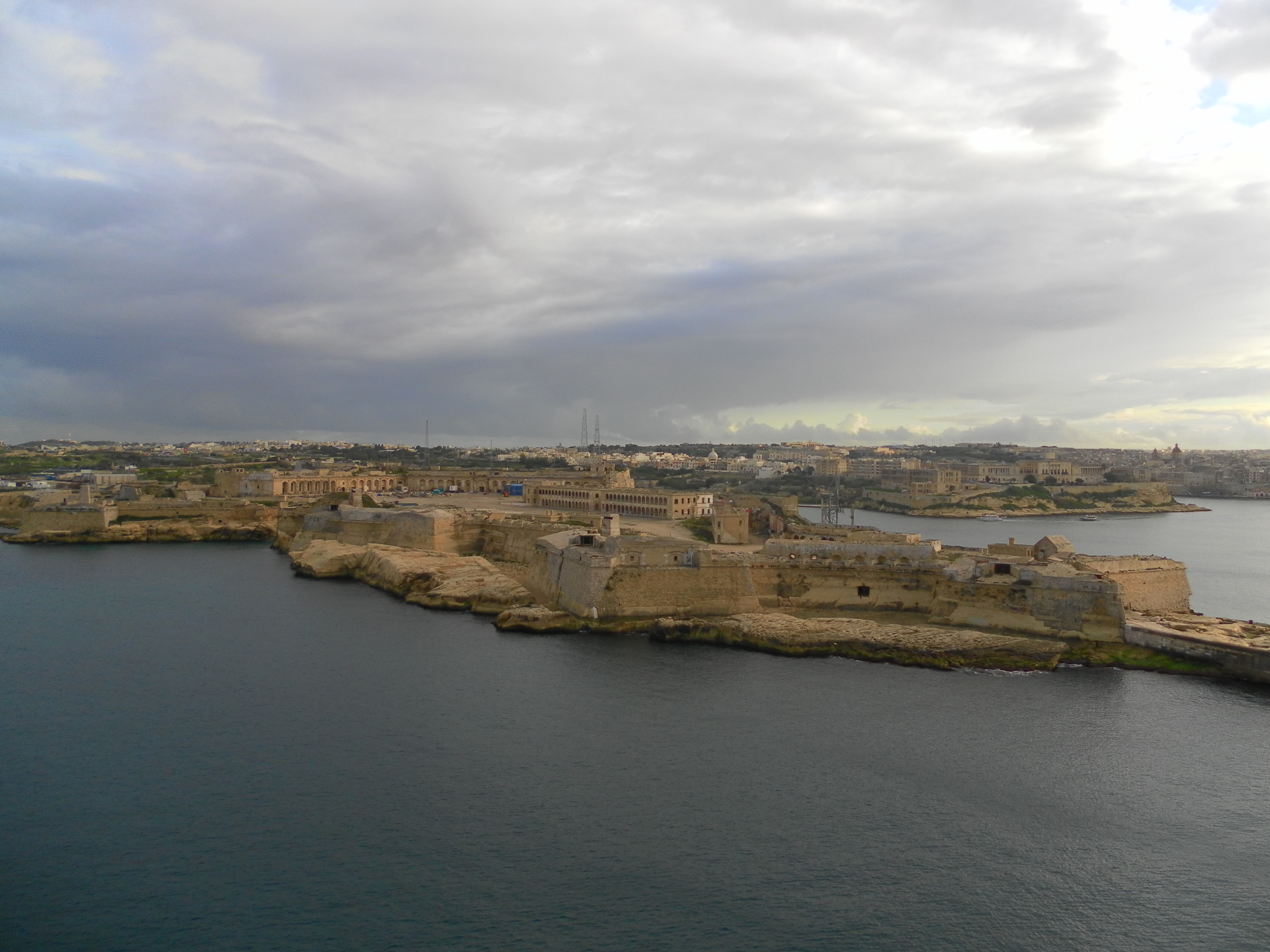
Seaward enceinte of Fort Ricasoli

The enceinte facing the open sea is made up of the following bastions and curtain walls:

- No. 1 Bastion – a demi-bastion linked to a tenaille, forming Point Battery. It originally contained an échaugette, a protruding tower, but this was dismantled to make way for a directing station for the Brennan Torpedo System. A gun emplacement for an RML 12.5-inch 38 ton gun is located on the bastion's face.
- No. 1 Curtain – curtain wall between No. 1 and No. 2 bastions, containing a casemated battery and a searchlight emplacement.
- No. 2 Bastion – an asymmetrical bastion containing embrasures, and various British gun emplacements, magazines and a fire control tower.
- No. 2 Curtain – curtain wall between No. 2 and No. 3 bastions, containing embrasures, an expense magazine (where ammunition intended for immediate use was stored) and a searchlight emplacement.
- No. 3 Bastion – a flat-faced bastion, containing embrasures and various British gun emplacements, magazines and a fire control tower.
- a curtain wall near No. 4 Bastion, containing embrasures, magazines and a sally port. Part of the curtain wall has collapsed into the sea.
- No. 4 Bastion – a small bastion, containing a gun emplacement, magazine, gun crew shelters and a fire control tower.
- No. 5 Curtain – curtain wall between No. 4 Bastion and St. Dominic Demi-Bastion of the land front, containing gun emplacements, magazines and gun crew shelters.

A shallow rock-hewn ditch extends from No. 1 to No. 3 bastions.

=== Harbour tenaille trace ===
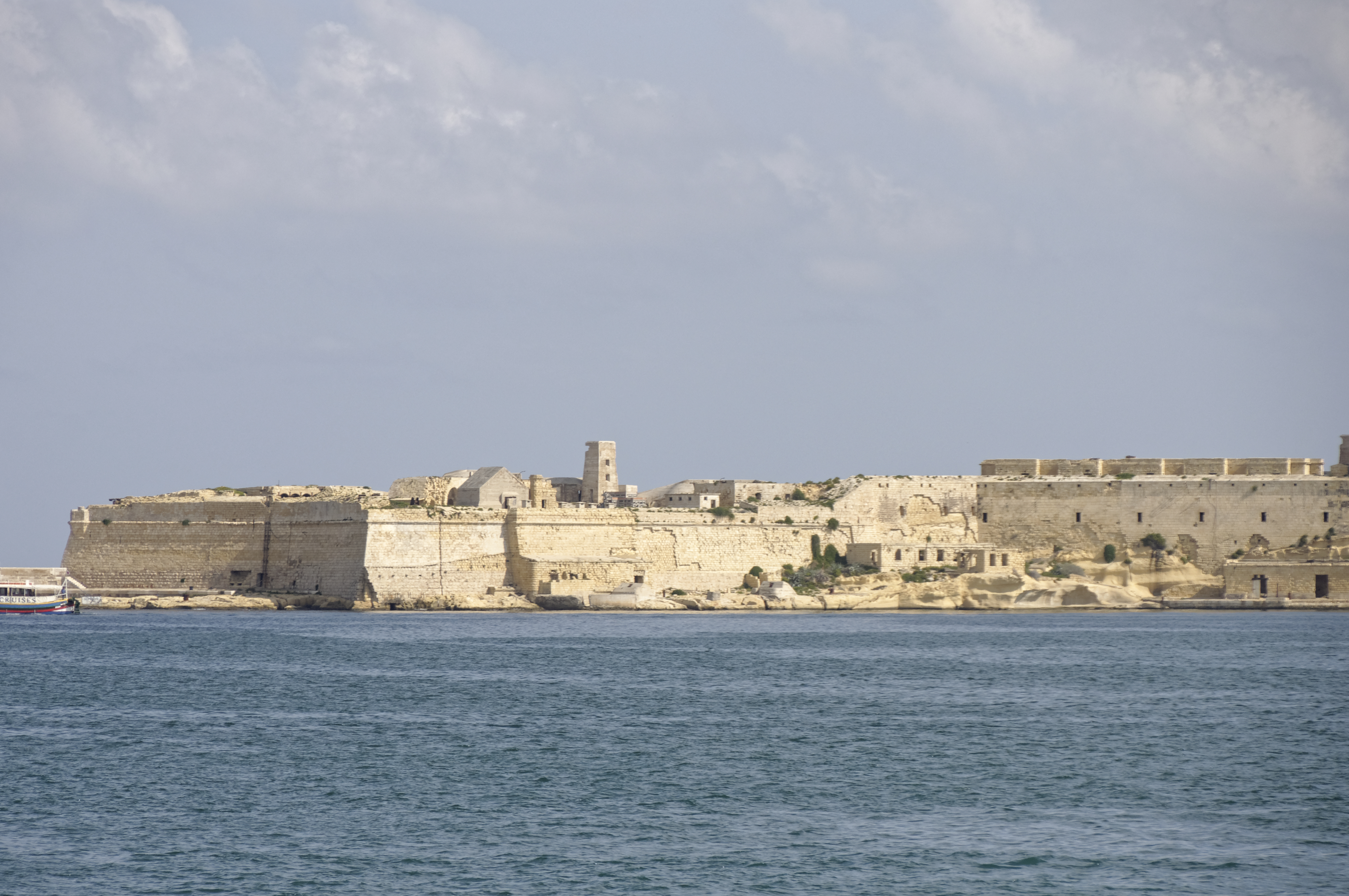
Part of the harbour-facing tenaille trace of Fort Ricasoli

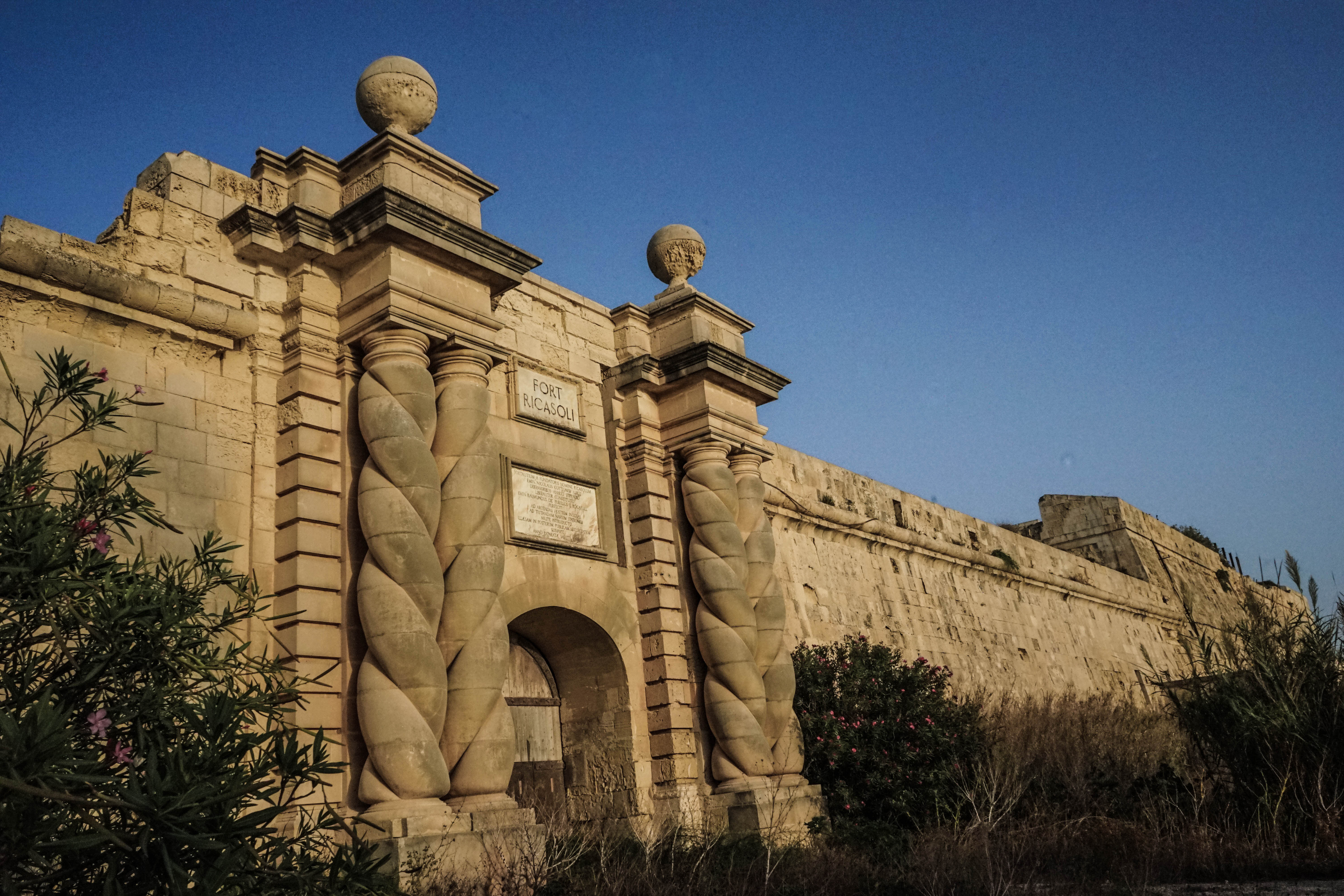
The Main Gate

The enceinte along Rinella Bay is made up of a tenaille trace with high walls. The fort's main gate is located within the enceinte. The Governor's House (now demolished) and a Chapel of St Nicholas are located within the fort, close to the main gate. An inscription on the gate commemorates the inauguration of the fort in 1698 and gives praise to Grand Master Perellos.

The rock-hewn ditch of Orsi Battery can still be seen at the northern end of the tenaille, at the tip of the peninsula.

The British built a Brennan Torpedo Station near the trace in the late 19th century.
