= St Luke's Garrison Chapel =

- Il-Knisja ta' San Luqa
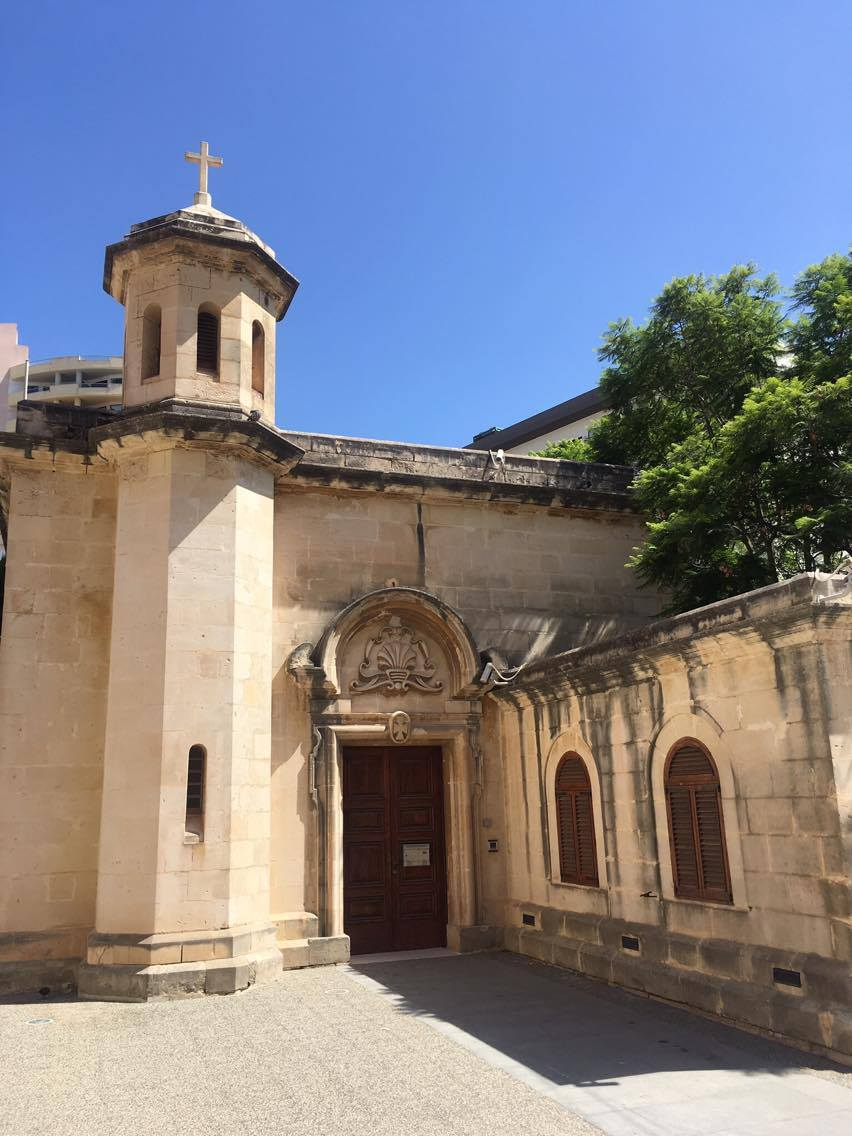

- Location within Malta
- 35°54′26.6″N 14°30′33.9″E
- Location: Sliema
- Country: Malta
- Previous denomination: Church of England

History
- Status: Secularised
- Founded: 16 January 1910
- Dedication: St Luke

Architecture
- Functional status: Offices
- Completed: 1910

The St Luke's Garrison Chapel is a defunct Anglican church which formed part of the Tigné Barracks and Cambridge Battery used by the British army until 1979. The building now contains offices of no religious purpose.

== History ==
The foundation stone for St Luke's was laid on 16 January 1910 by the Governor of Malta, Sir Leslie Rundle. The church was built to serve the British army stationed in the Tigné Barracks, thus only accessible to military personnel. The chapel was finished some months later and opened for its first service on Advent Sunday, 27 November 1910. It was dedicated by William Collins, Bishop of Gibraltar.

During WWII the chapel was badly damaged and so declared unsafe, with the congregation having to attend services at the nearby church of the Holy Trinity. The chapel continued to be used until 1979 when the British forces left Malta. Consequently, the chapel and the surrounding military area were left abandoned. It was still used from time to time in the 1980s to host some meetings of the Assoċjazzjoni Sportiva Tigne, cultural events and rock concerts by Rokarja AST, as well as various theatrical productions. In the early 1990s it also served as a venue for tai chi training and ballroom dancing. Chapel restoration commenced in 2003, along with other parts of the Tigné peninsula and Manoel Island.

== Interior ==
The interior of the church included a chancel, two aisles, nave, an organ and a vestry. There was one stone altar surrounded with Corinthian capitalised style pillars forming three panels. The altar rail was decorated with Maltese crosses with the chancel floor finished off with red tiles and white marble steps. During restoration works the original floor finishing was retained.
