= Sliema Point Battery =

- Il-Fortizza ta' Tas-Sliema
- Sliema, Malta
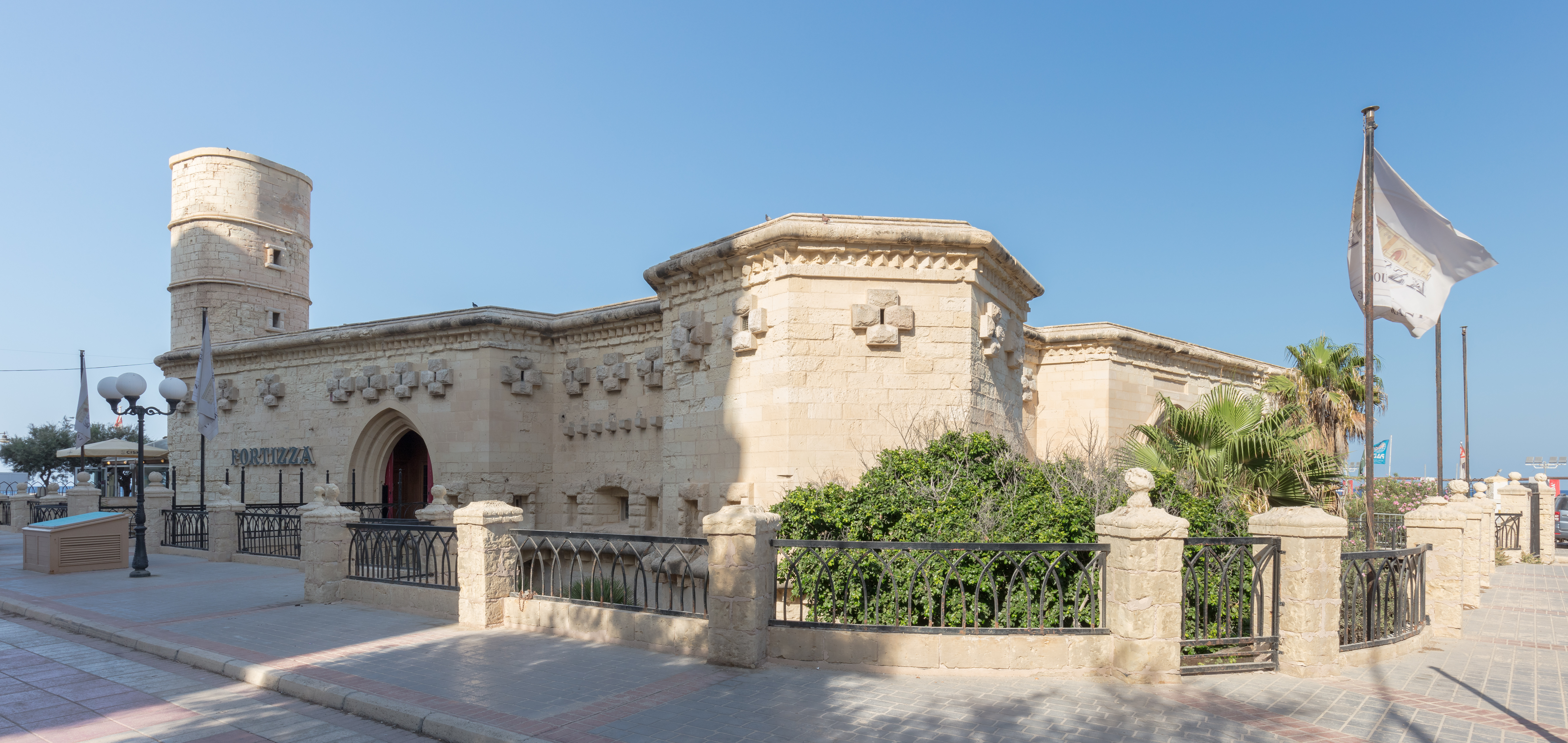
- Sliema Point Battery

Site information
- Type: Artillery battery
- Controlled by: Fortizza Bar & Restaurant
- Open to the public: Yes (as a restaurant)
- Condition: Intact
- Website: http://fortizzamalta.com/

Location
- Coordinates: 35°54′50.9″N 14°30′25.7″E

Site history
- Built: 1872-1876
- Built by: British Empire
- Materials: Limestone

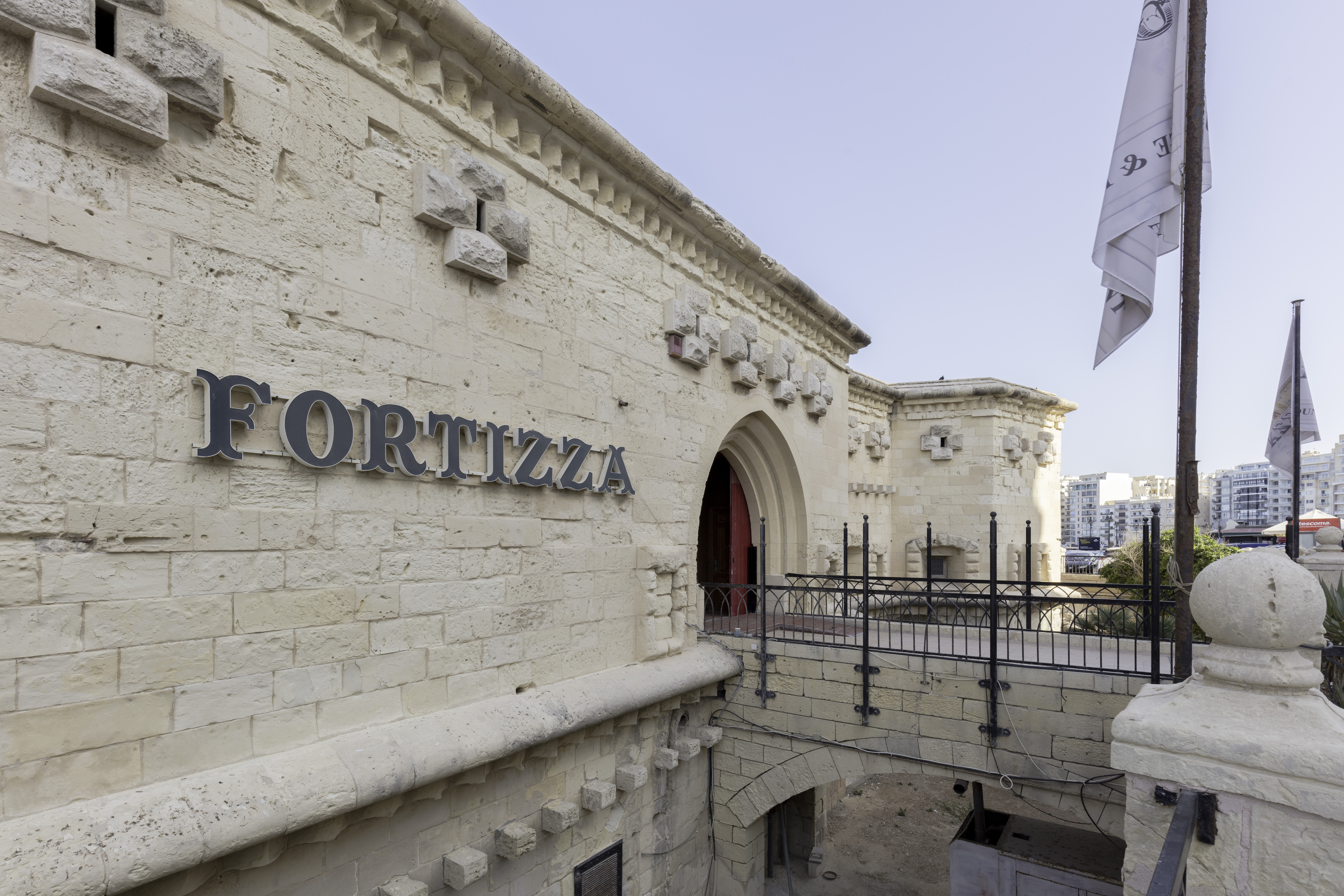
Entrance

Sliema Point Battery (Maltese: Batterija tal-Ponta ta' Tas-Sliema), also known as Fort Sliema (Maltese: Il-Fortizza ta' Tas-Sliema), is an artillery battery in Sliema, Malta. It was built by the British between 1872 and 1876. The battery stands on the peninsula that separates Marsamxett Harbour from St. Julian's Bay. The battery was later used as a searchlight position, and it is now a restaurant known as Il-Fortizza (The Fortress).

The battery is located at Tower Road, one of Malta's most popular seaside promenades, which was named after the 17th century Saint Julian's Tower. Like Sliema Point Battery, this tower is now also used as a restaurant.

== History ==
The construction of Sliema Point Battery started in 1872 by the British, as part of a program of improvements to Malta's fortifications recommended in Colonel Jervois' Report of 1866 titled "Memorandum concerning the improvements to the defences of Malta and Gibraltar, rendered necessary by the introduction of Iron Plated Ships and powerful rifled guns".

The battery, which was completed in 1876, has many Gothic Revival architectural features, such as the main gate. Construction cost a total of £12,000.

The battery was armed with two 10 inch and two 11 inch rifled muzzle-loading guns. These guns were removed in 1905, and a searchlight tower was built on part of the battery. It was then used as a searchlight position to expose enemy ships approaching the Grand Harbour area.

From around 1912, the Sliema Aquatic Sports Club began to meet near the battery. eventually, a water polo venue was built near the battery, and it is still used by the Sliema Aquatic Sports Club to this day.

== Present day ==
The fort is now used as a restaurant known as Fortizza Bar and Restaurant and commonly called Il-Fortizza. It came under new management in 2009.
