= Sliema =

Sliema Tas-Sliema
- Local council
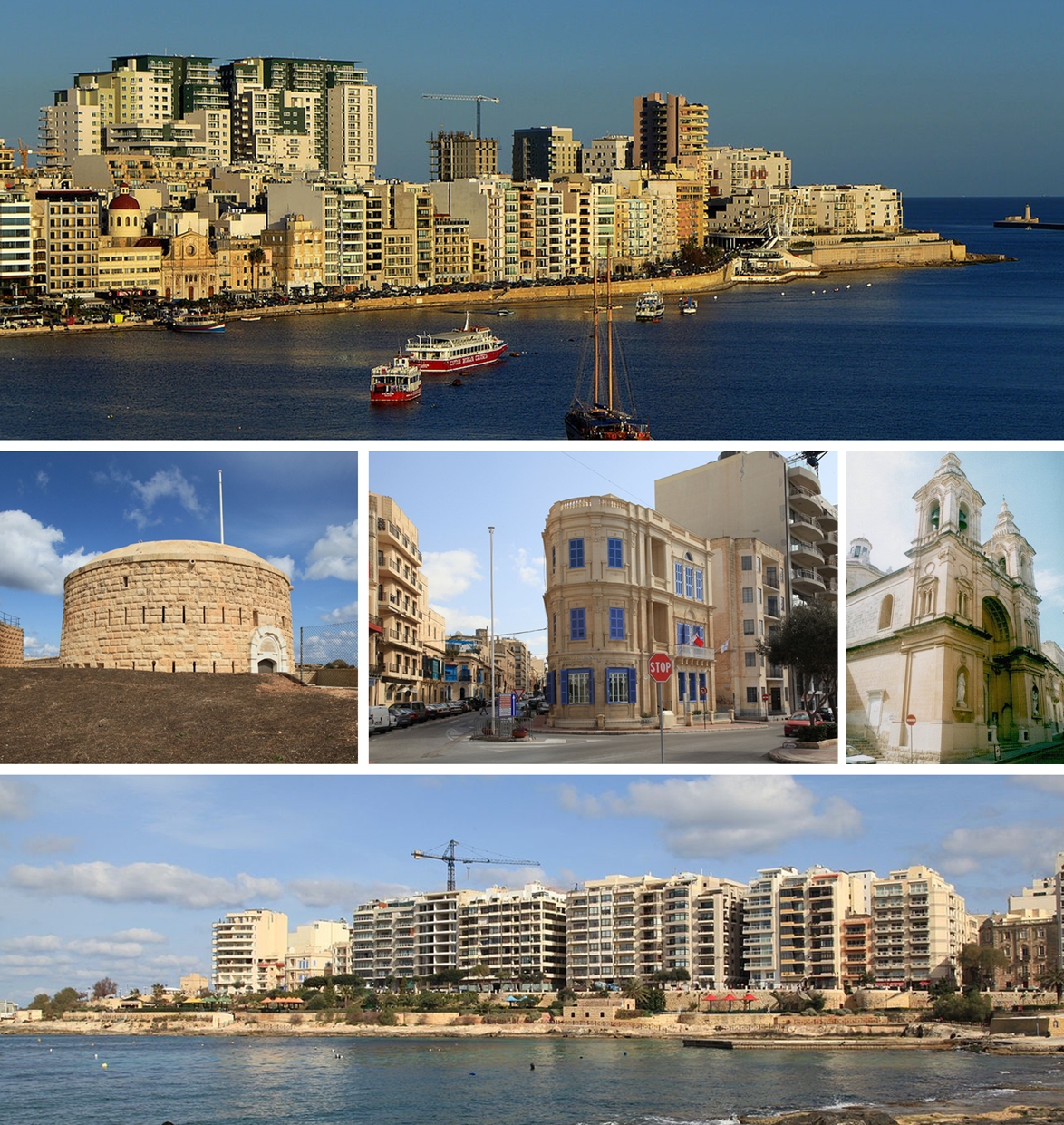
- From top: Skyline in the Strand and Tigné Point, Fort Tigné, Lombard Bank building, Stella Maris Church, skyline of Tower Road

- Flag Coat of arms
- Nickname: Tax-xelin
- Motto: Celer Ad Oras Surgo
- Interactive map of Sliema
- Coordinates: 35°54′44″N 14°30′15″E
- Country: Malta
- Region: Eastern Region
- District: Northern Harbour District
- Borders: Gżira, St. Julian's

Government
  - Mayor: John Pillow (PN)

Area
  - Total: 1.3 km^{2} (0.50 sq mi)

Population (Jul. 2024)
  - Total: 22,224
  - Density: 17,000/km^{2} (44,000/sq mi)
- Demonym(s): Slimiż (m), Slimiża (f), Slimiżi (pl)
- Time zone: UTC+1 (CET)
  - Summer (DST): UTC+2 (CEST)
- Postal code: SLM
- Dialing code: 356
- ISO 3166 code: MT-56
- Patron saint: Our Lady, Star of the Sea
- Day of festa: First Sunday after 18 August
- Website: sliemalc.gov.mt/en

Sliema (Maltese: Tas-Sliema [tɐˈsːlɪːmɐ]) is a town located on the northeast coast of Malta in the Northern Harbour District. It is a major residential and commercial area and a centre for shopping, bars, dining, and café life. It is also the most densely populated town on the island.

Lining the coastline is a promenade known as the Sliema Front that has become the popular spot for joggers and walkers as well as a prolific meeting place for locals during the summer season. Sliema is also known for its numerous rocky beaches, water sports and hotels. The Strand in Sliema is a popular viewing spot for fireworks displays that take place in August.

Sliema, which means 'peace' or 'comfort', was once a quiet fishing village on the peninsula across Marsamxett Harbour from Valletta and has views of the capital city. The population began to grow in 1853 and the town was declared a parish in 1878. Now Sliema and the coastline up to neighbouring St. Julian's constitute Malta's main coastal resort.

Sliema is considered a desirable place to live and is relatively affluent, with extremely high property prices compared to the national average. Historically, stylish villas and traditional Maltese townhouses lined the streets of Sliema. Sliema has now been ringed with modern apartment blocks, some of which are amongst the tallest buildings in Malta. This has resulted in significant traffic, parking and construction-related noise pollution issues.

Residents of Sliema are stereotypically known for their usage of English as a first language, although this is changing in the 21st century due to demographic shifts. Maltese people from Sliema are referred to as Slimiżi.

== Etymology ==
Sliema is the Maltese word meaning 'peace', and was used to salute someone. The triconsonantal root of the word is Š-L-M.

Sliema may have got its name from the Our Lady of Good Voyage Chapel, that now no longer exists. It periodically served as a reference point for the sailors and fishermen in Marsamxett Harbour. The construction age of the church is unknown but it was included in a map by the Order of St. John even before being handed the Maltese islands to them. The name could thus be connected with the first words of the Hail Mary prayer, which in Maltese is Sliem Għalik Marija.

There is also a possibility that the origin is from an Arabic first name or a Hebrew family name.

Sliema in 1998

== History ==
=== The Knights of Malta period ===
At the Great Siege of 1565, il-Qortin, as it was then known, was a camp centre for Turkish troops led by Dragut. He met his fate there, having been killed by a bombardment from Fort Saint Elmo at the other flank of Marsamxett Harbour, where Sliema stands. Fort Tigné was eventually built by the Knights of St. John in the late 18th century and further developed by the British in later years.

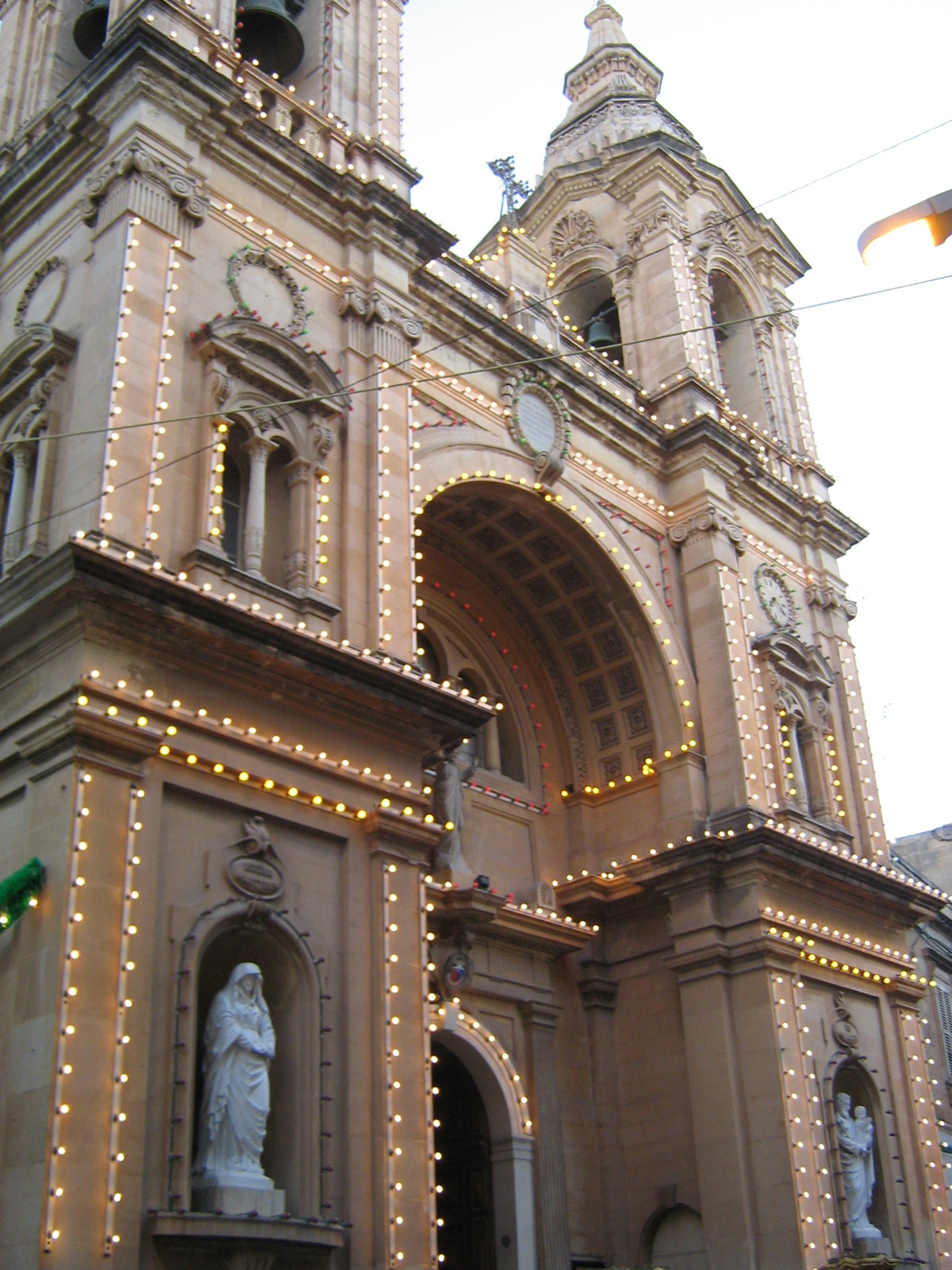
The Matrice of Sliema and Gzira dedicated to Our Lady Star of the Sea (Stella Maris)

=== The British period ===
In 1855, a new church dedicated to Our Lady Star of the Sea ("Stella Maris") was opened to public worship. Around the new church, the small village grew into a town. By 1878, the population grew to such an extent that the religious authorities had the Stella Maris Church declared a parish in its own right and it was separated from St.Helen's parish of Birkirkara.

The town began to develop rapidly in the second half of the 19th century, becoming popular as a summer resort for wealthier Valletta residents. Their elegant villas and town houses lined the quiet, inland streets. Various Victorian buildings stood along its three-kilometre sea promenade which overlooked rugged rocks, farms and even a small sandy beach. In 1990 one of these farms which had been abandoned was transformed into a coastline garden known as Ġnien Indipendenza (Independence Garden).

A few Victorian, as well as Art Nouveau houses, still remain in the inner streets, although only a handful remain along the shoreline, as there has been significant modern development of apartment blocks and hotels. A distinctive group of six traditional houses with Maltese balconies has survived remarkably intact at Belvedere Terrace, set back from Ix-Xatt (the Strand). These houses overlook Manoel Island to the South across the Sliema Creek; the houses have heritage protection and the lower buildings between them and Ix-Xatt cannot be built upwards.

The British built a number of fortifications on the Sliema peninsula in the 19th century. These were Sliema Point Battery (1872–1876), Cambridge Battery (1878–1886) and Garden Battery (1889–1894). In addition, the 18th century Fort Tigné remained in use as well, and barracks were built on the Tigné peninsula.

In 1881 the first sea water distillery on the island was erected in Sliema in order to provide water to the Tigné barracks. In 1882 the distillery was decommissioned and the building, which still stands today, has been occupied by a printing press since that time. The barracks it supplied water to were demolished in 2001 in order to make way for the development of Tigné Point development.

The town has a considerable number of streets connected with the British era in Malta, such as Norfolk Street, Amery Street, Windsor Terrace, Graham Street, Milner Street and Fort Cambridge.

In 1941, during the Second World War Siege of Malta, Sliema was hit by some Axis bombers during an air raid that caused the death of 21 civilians.

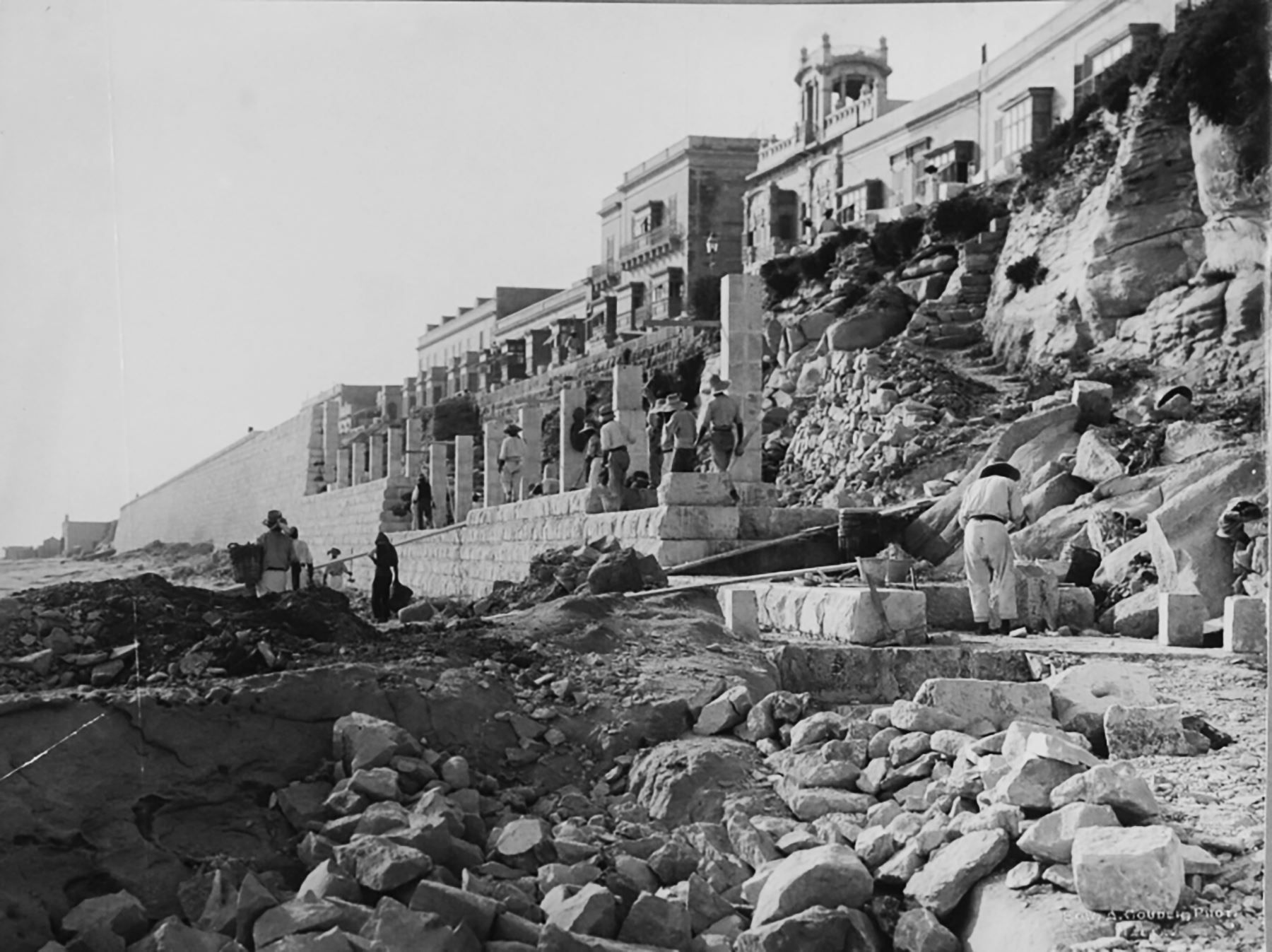
Construction of the Sliema promenade, ca. 1890

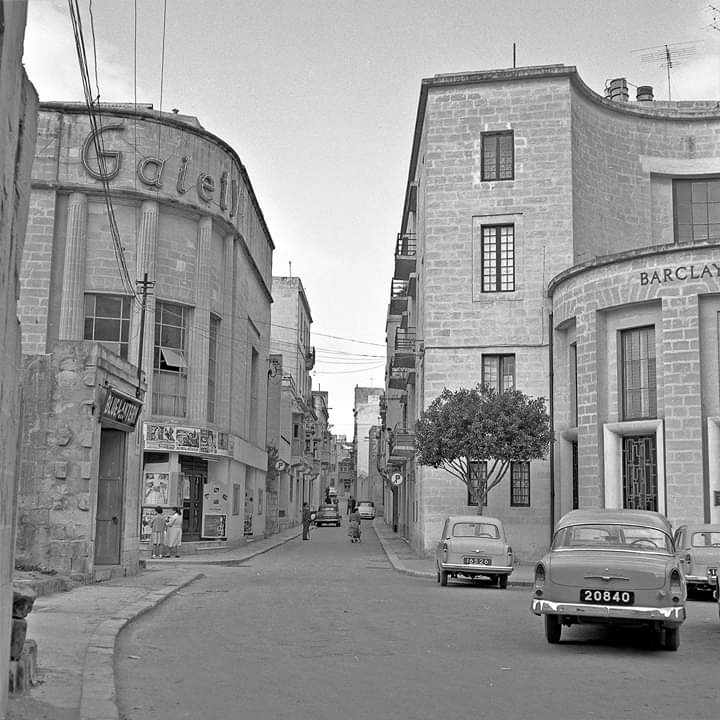
Cinema Gaiety and Barclay's Bank, 1958

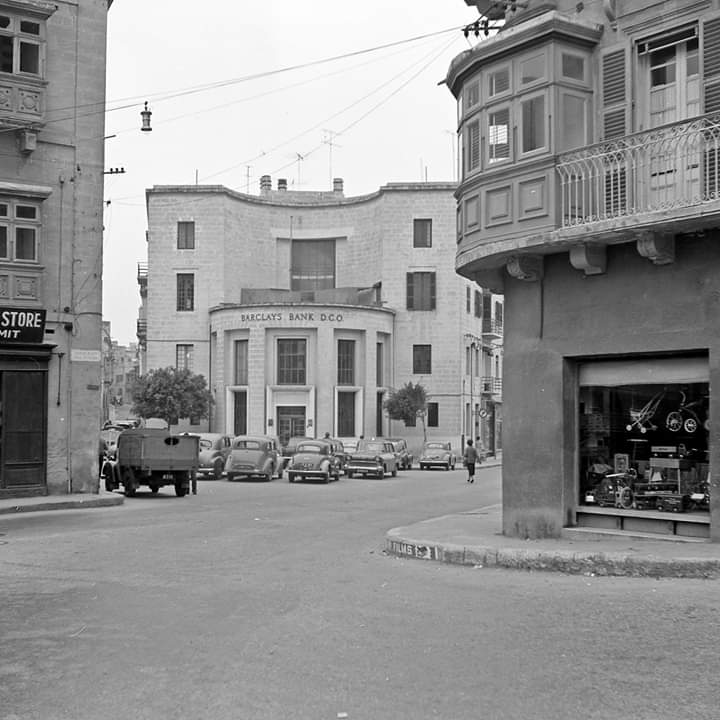
Barclay's Bank, 1958

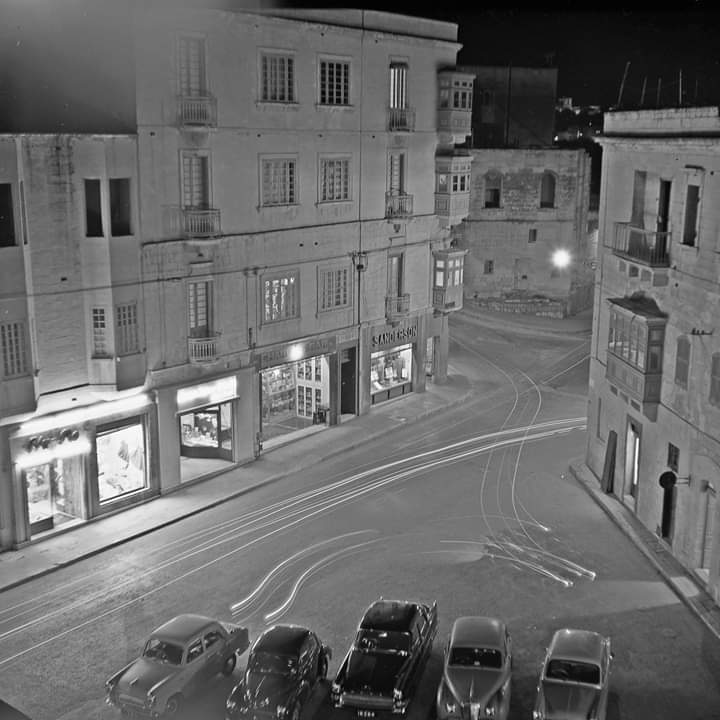
Sliema by night, 1958

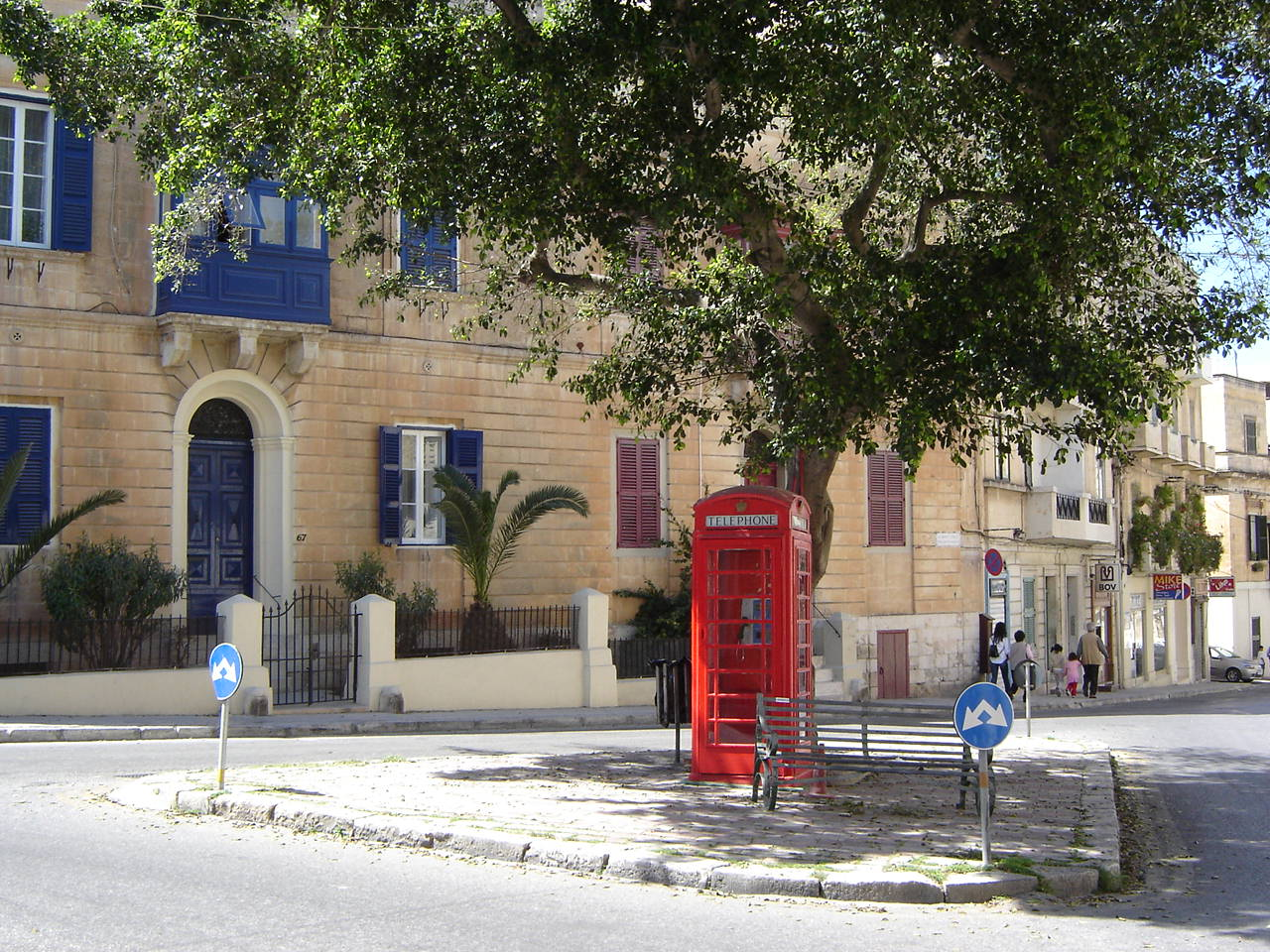
British phone-box

=== Post-independence ===
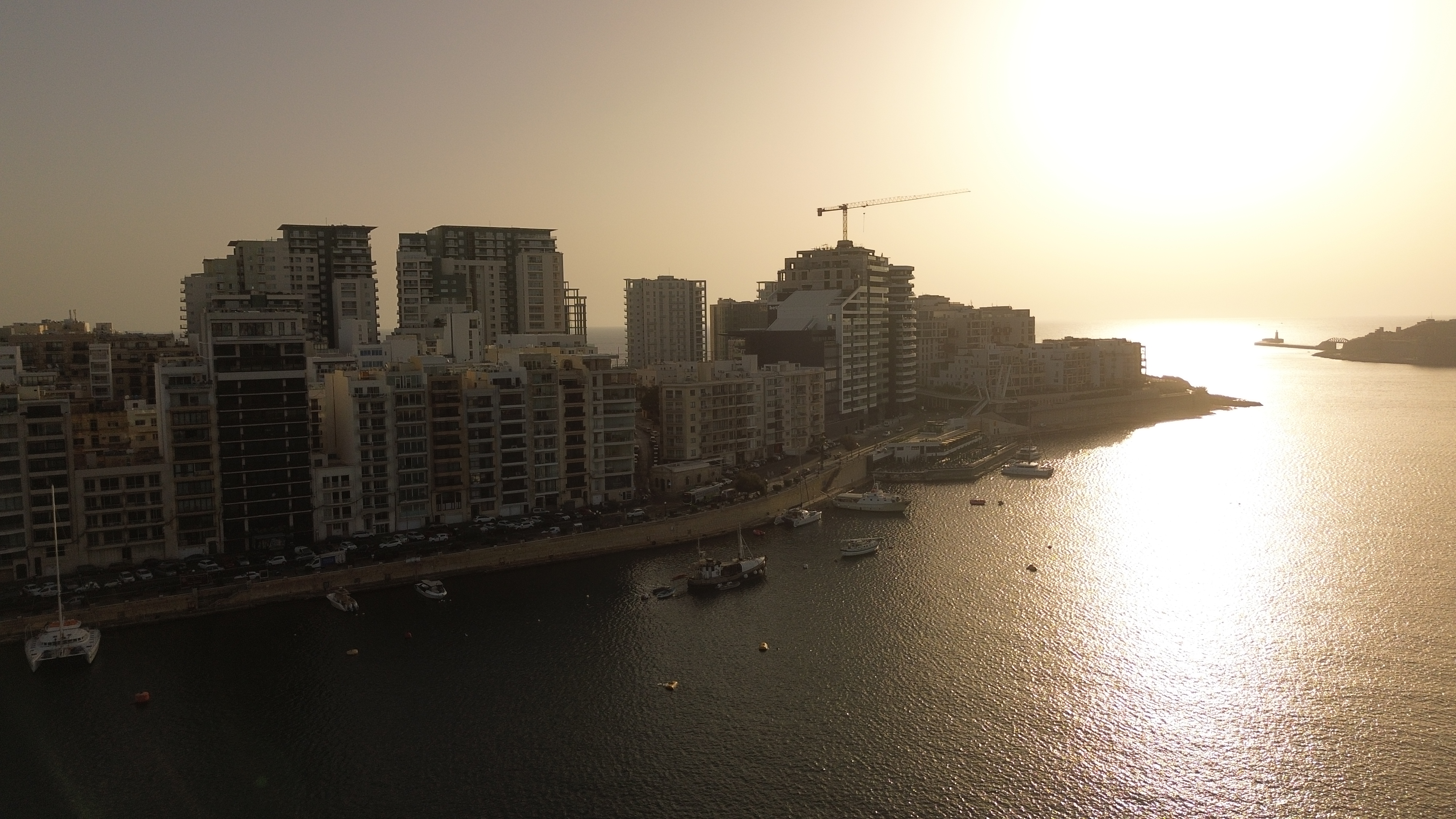
Sliema, looking east, just after sunrise

Sliema has been the site of intensive development in recent decades. The Victorian houses that lined Tower Road have all been replaced by apartment buildings built in modern architectural style. Several of these have views of the Mediterranean Sea or Valletta but their development has been controversial. The promenade has been upgraded in the late 1990s and is a common spot for leisurely walking, particularly on warm summer nights when it remains crowded into the early hours of the morning. Shopping is primarily centred in an area called the Ferries (the Strand or ix-Xatt, Tower Road and Bisazza Street) and the more recently opened Tigne Point shopping mall. Restaurants and cafés can be found along the promenade.

Development, high population density, parking problems and high property prices have led many younger people originally from the area to choose to live elsewhere on the island and consequently Sliema is suffering from an aging population. There are several foreign expatriates who reside in Sliema. There remains net inward migration to Sliema. The prevalence of use amongst Sliema residents of English as a first language is decreasing although it remains significantly higher than other localities on the island. Code-switching in English sentences with peppered Maltese words and phrases is relatively common in Sliema, as well as St. Julian's, Pembroke, Swieqi, Madliena, San Ġwann and Kappara, although there are several individuals who speak exclusively in English or Maltese without mixing the two (see Maltenglish). There are a number of Maltese people who are fluent in English but struggle with the Maltese language, and this reflects use of English at home and at English-speaking schools. Despite some misconceptions and stereotypes, the vast majority of people from Sliema are fluent in Maltese and speak it as a first language.

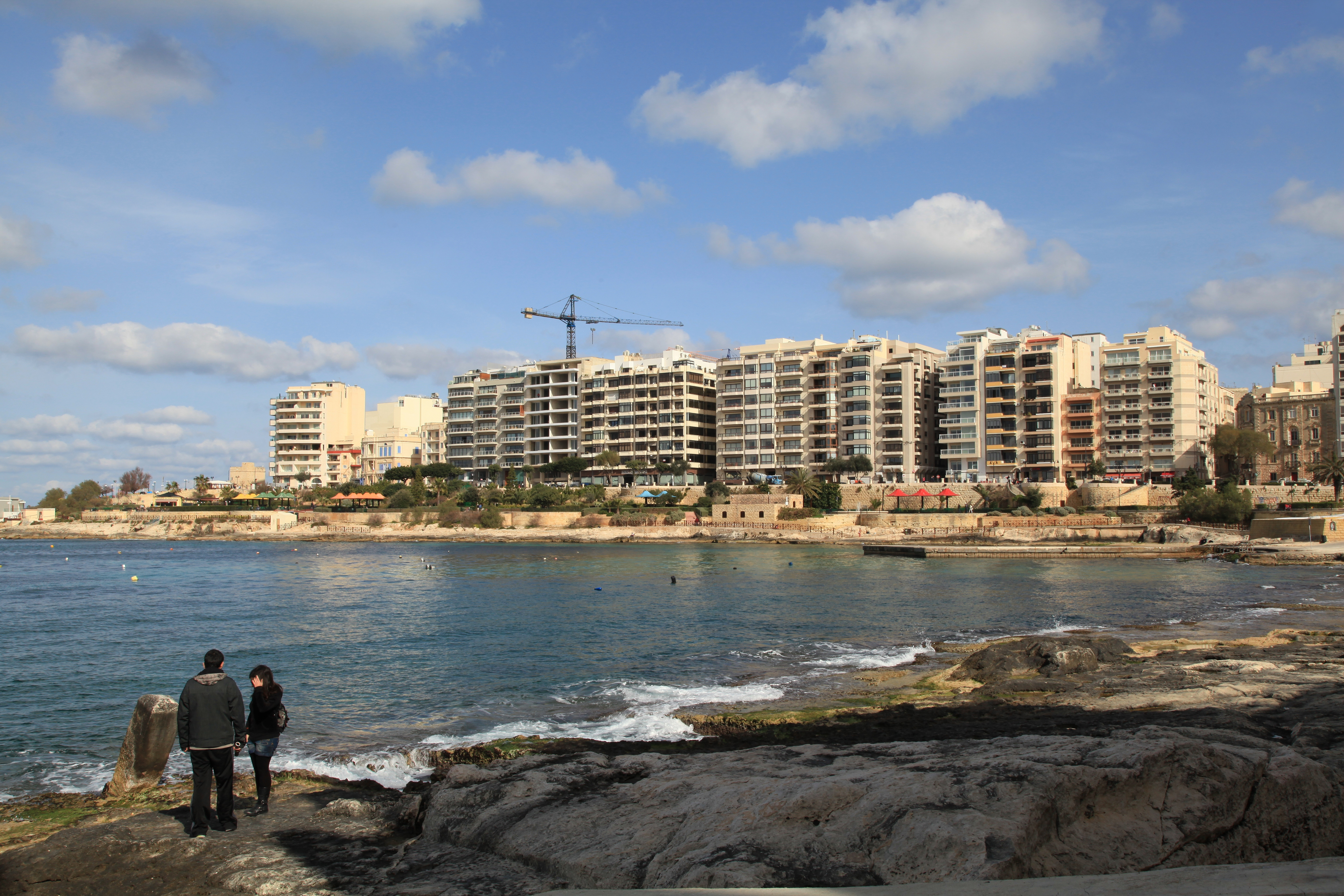
Sliema skyline from Balluta

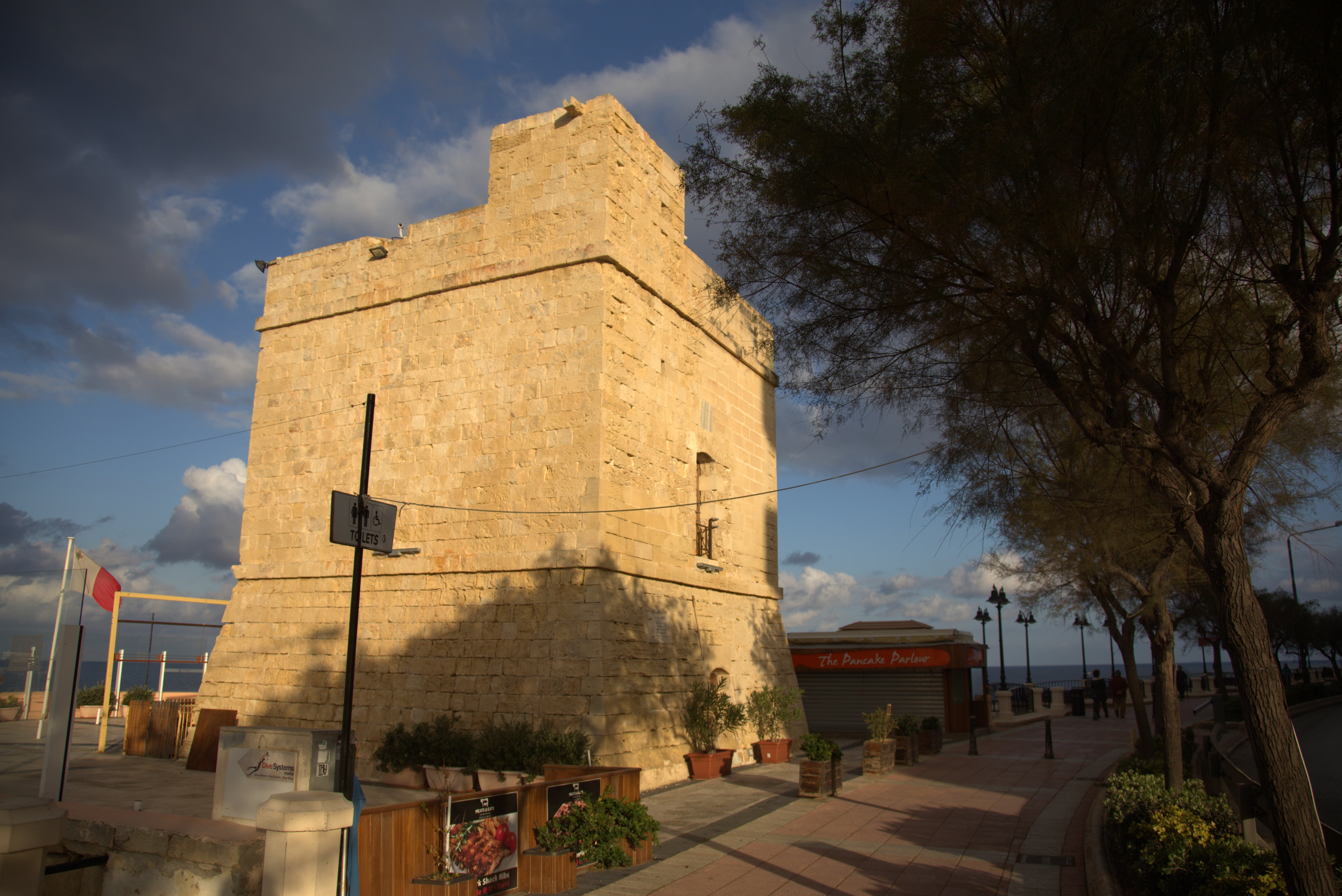
St. Julian's Tower

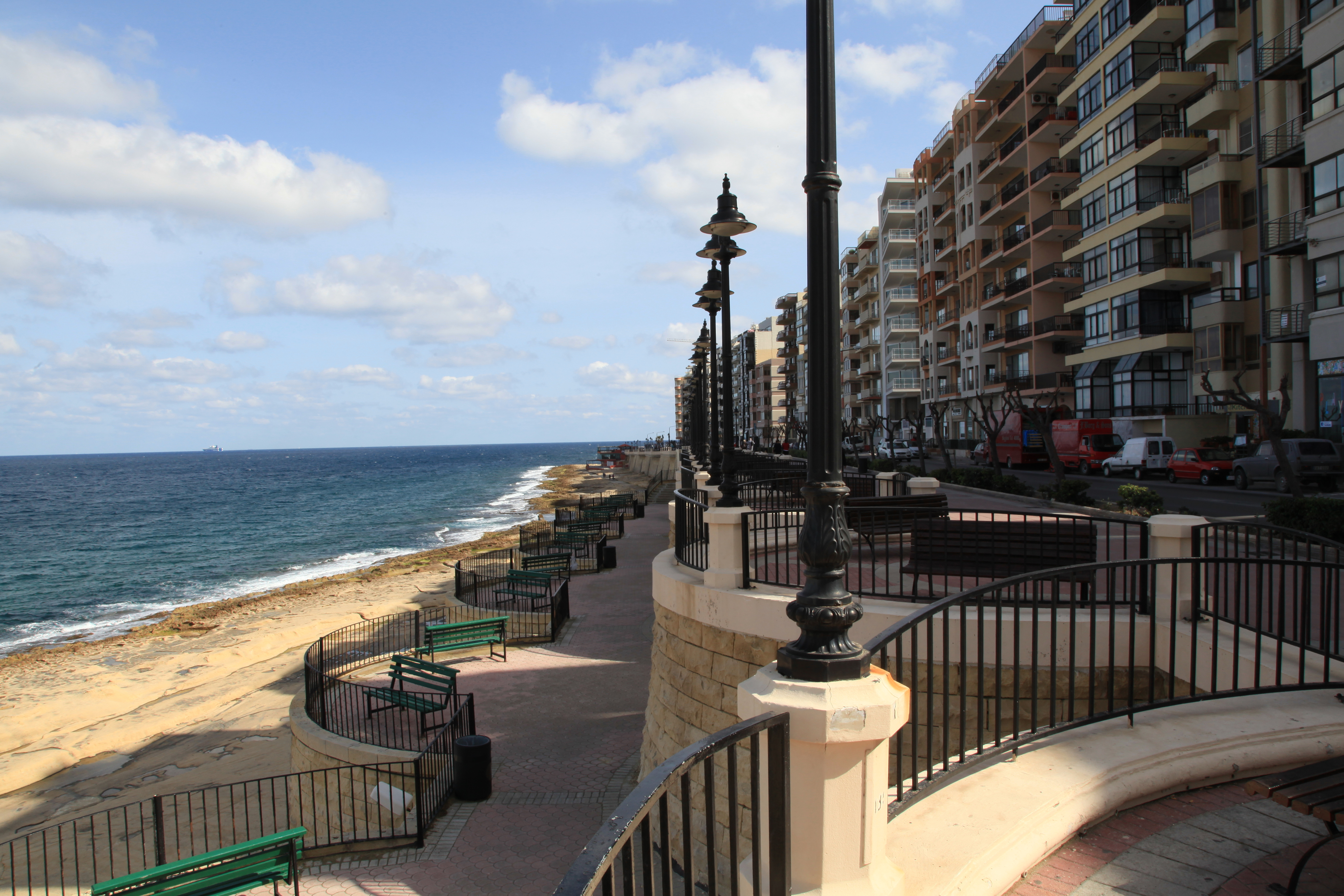
Promenade

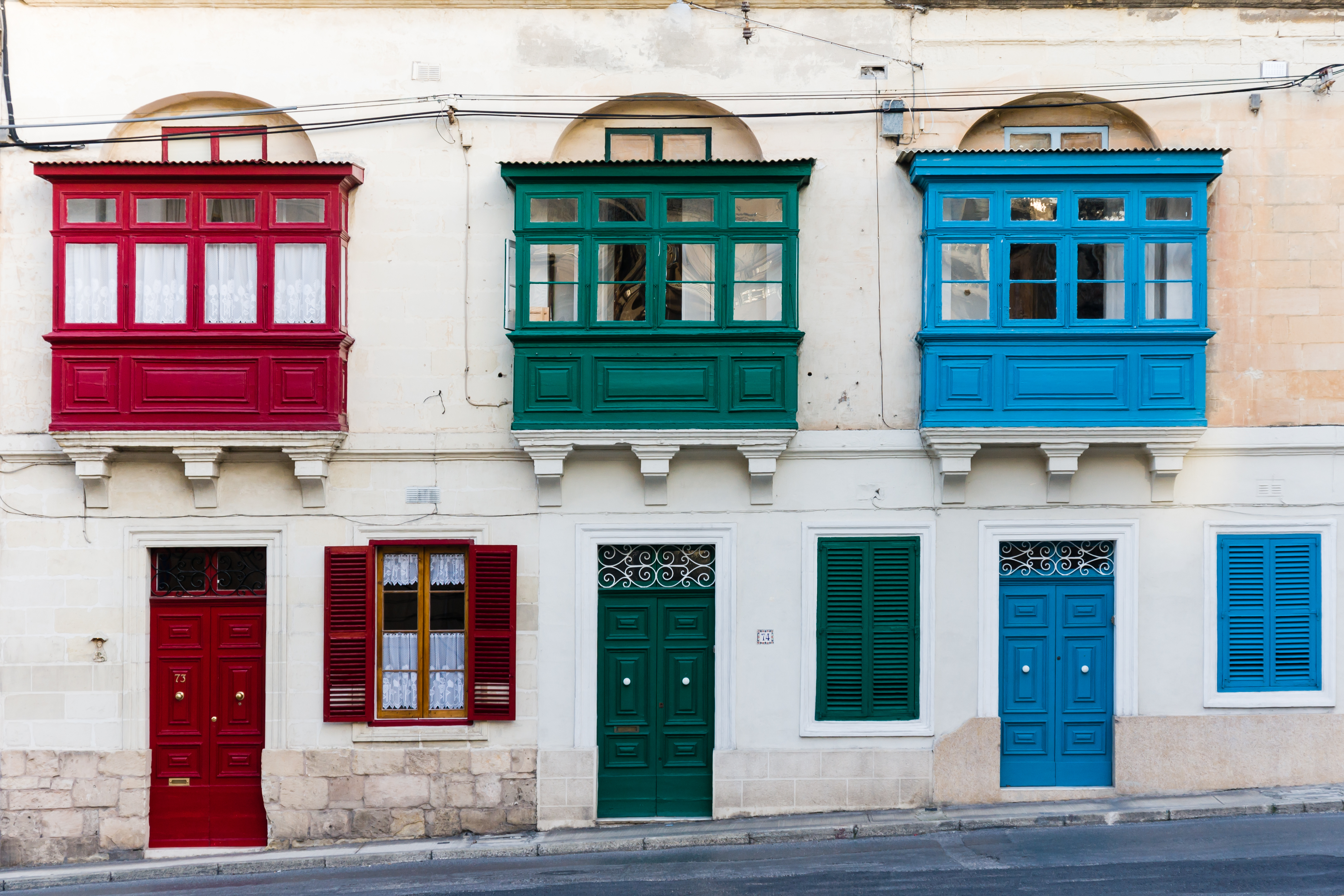
Traditional Maltese houses

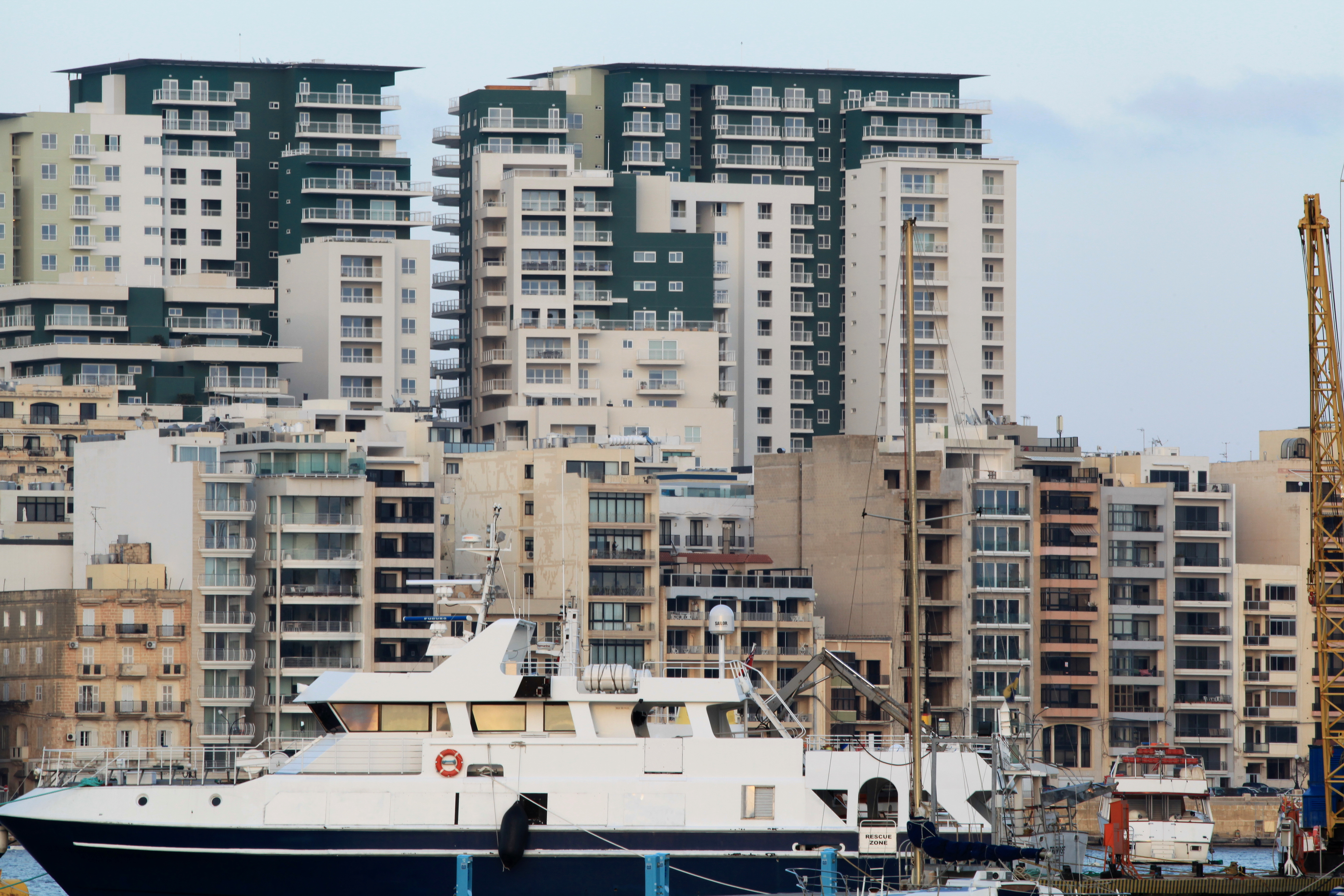
Fort Cambridge high rise buildings

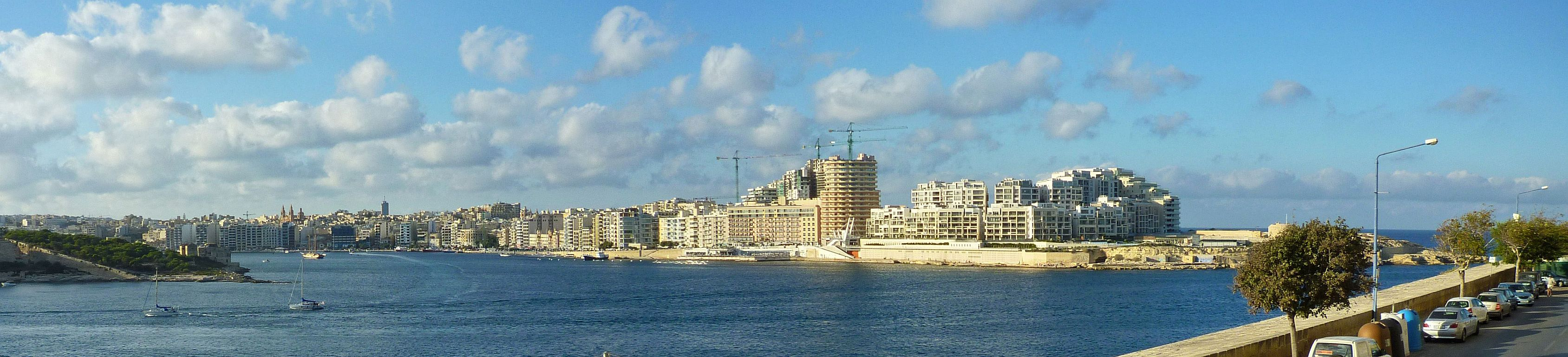
Skyline of Sliema

== Geography ==
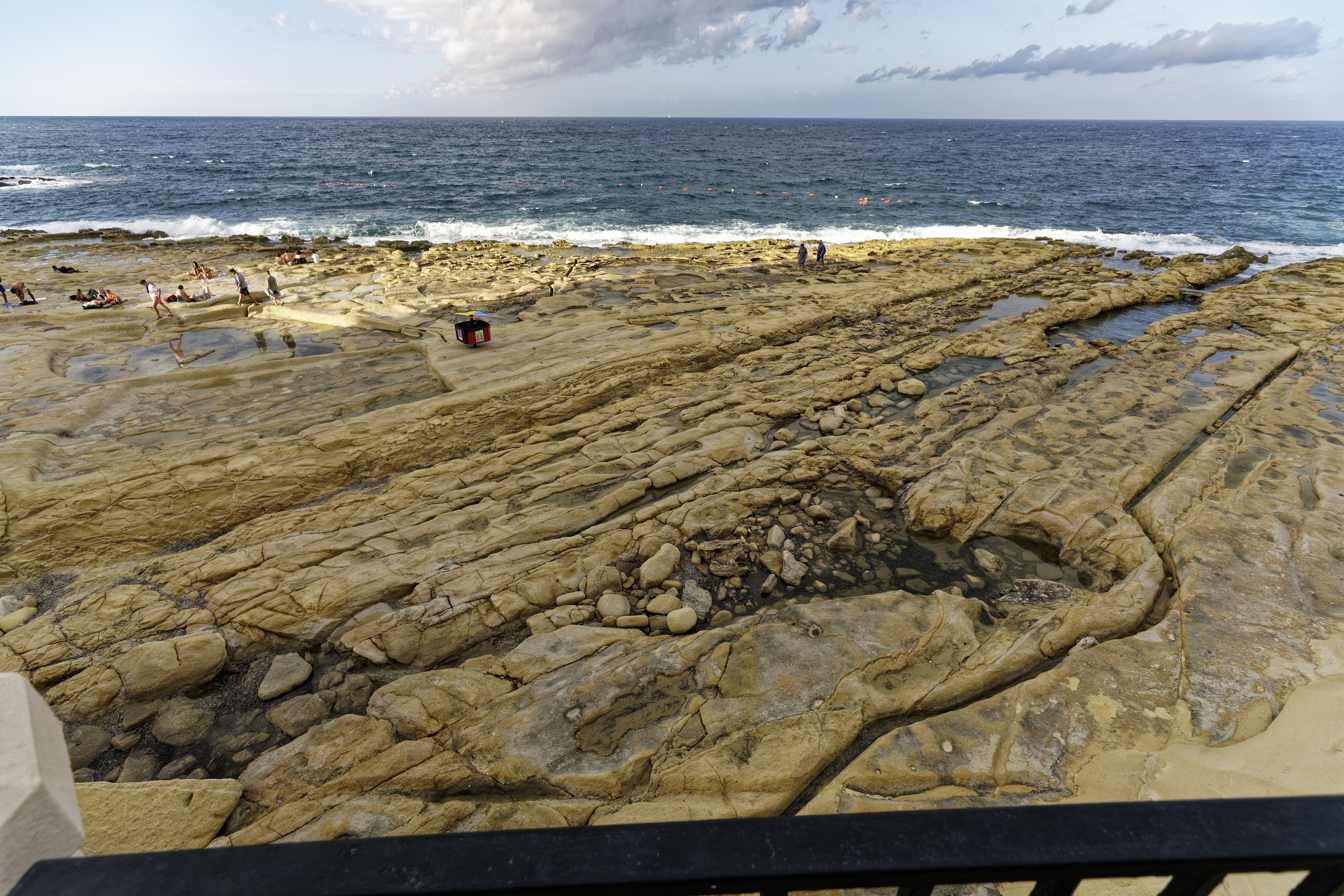
The Sliemese Coastline at Fond Ghadir

Locality is highly urban but surrounded with promenade and sea.

Sliema (or Tas-Sliema) is a town located on the northeast coast of Malta. It is a center for shopping, restaurants and café life. Sliema is also a major commercial and residential area and houses several hotels. Sliema, which means ‘peace, comfort’, was once a quiet fishing village on the peninsula across Marsamxett Harbour from Valletta, but now Sliema and the coastline up to neighbouring St. Julian’s constitutes Malta’s main coastal resort.

== Population and notable residents ==
The population of Sliema is over 20,000 and has a significant turnover of foreign expatriates who reside temporarily. The town was the residence of the late Giorgio Borġ Olivier, former prime minister and architect of Malta's independence and the temporary residence of Manwel Dimech, a revolutionary thinker at the turn of the 20th century. He died in exile in Egypt and Lower Prince of Wales Road was renamed in his honour. Tas-Sliema is also the hometown of footballer Michael Mifsud and music artist Ira Losco.

The population of Sliema was 22,224 in July 2024. This included 11,365 males and 10,859 females; 10,250 Maltese nationals and 11,974 foreign nationals.

Following the introduction of the iGaming industry in Malta, Sliema has also seen an increase in the number of foreign residents, primarily from Scandinavia.

It was the birthplace of several people: former prime minister Alfred Sant; Michael Falzon of the Malta Labour Party; George Stivala, High Commissioner for Malta in Australia during the 1950s and 1960s; Archbishop George Caruana (1882–1951), the venerable Don Nazzareno Camilleri (1906–1973), British journalist Peter Hitchens, vocalist Marc Storace of the Swiss heavy metal band Krokus, and Dublin-based singer/songwriter Adrian Crowley.

Irish billionaire Denis O'Brien has a "residential address" as Flat 6/60, Suite F, Tigne Street in Sliema, according to O'Brien's own filing with the Companies Registration Office (CRO). The Maltese-born, American-naturalized actor Joseph Calleia lived in Sliema from his retirement in 1963 to his death in 1975.

- Evelyn Bonaci, Maltese politician
- John A. Gauci-Maistre, Maltese businessperson
- Lino Grech, Maltese actor, writer, and director
- Guido Lanfranco, Maltese writer, naturalist, and folklorist
- Sir Luigi Preziosi, Maltese politician and ophthalmologist
- Simon Tortell, Maltese footballer
- Marjanu Vella, Maltese poet

== Education ==
Schools in Sliema:

- St. Joseph School Sliema
- St. Francis' Girls' Secondary School
- St. Dorothy's
- St Patrick's
- Ursuline Creche
- St Benild's
- Government Primary School

English language schools

- Language Studies International (LSI)
- Geos English Language School
- inlingua School of Languages
- Linguatime School of English – Tower Road
- IELS – Mattew Pulis Street
- AM Language School
- ECS English Communication School
- English Language Academy
- Maltalingua
- LAL - Language Centres Malta

== Landmarks ==
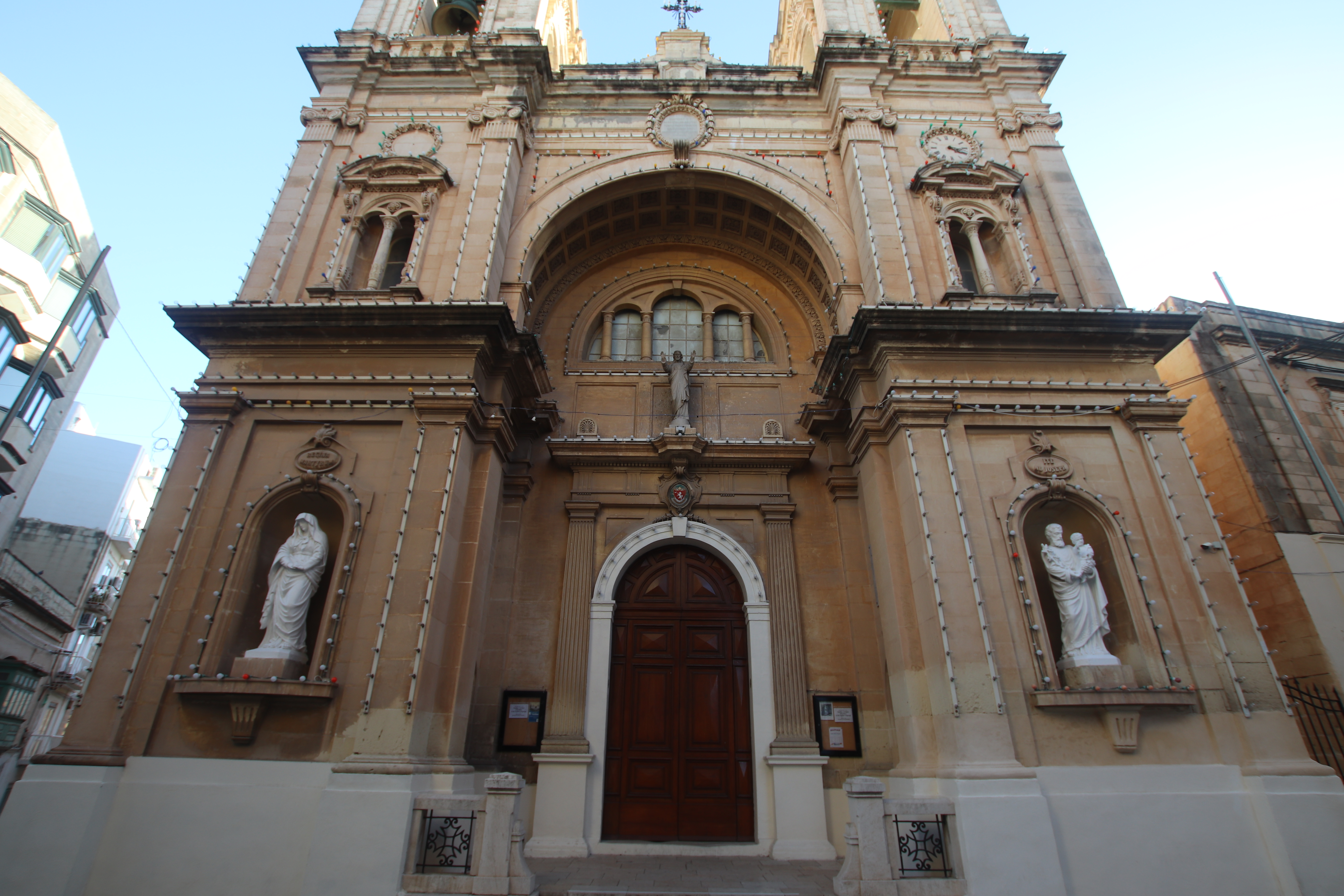
Stella Maris Church, Sliema

- Our Lady Star of the Sea Church (Stella Maris) – Mother Parish of Sliema, est 1878 - The Stella Maris Parish Church is a Roman Catholic parish in Sliema, Malta. It is the matrice of the other parish churches in Sliema and Gżira, the oldest parish church dating from 1878.

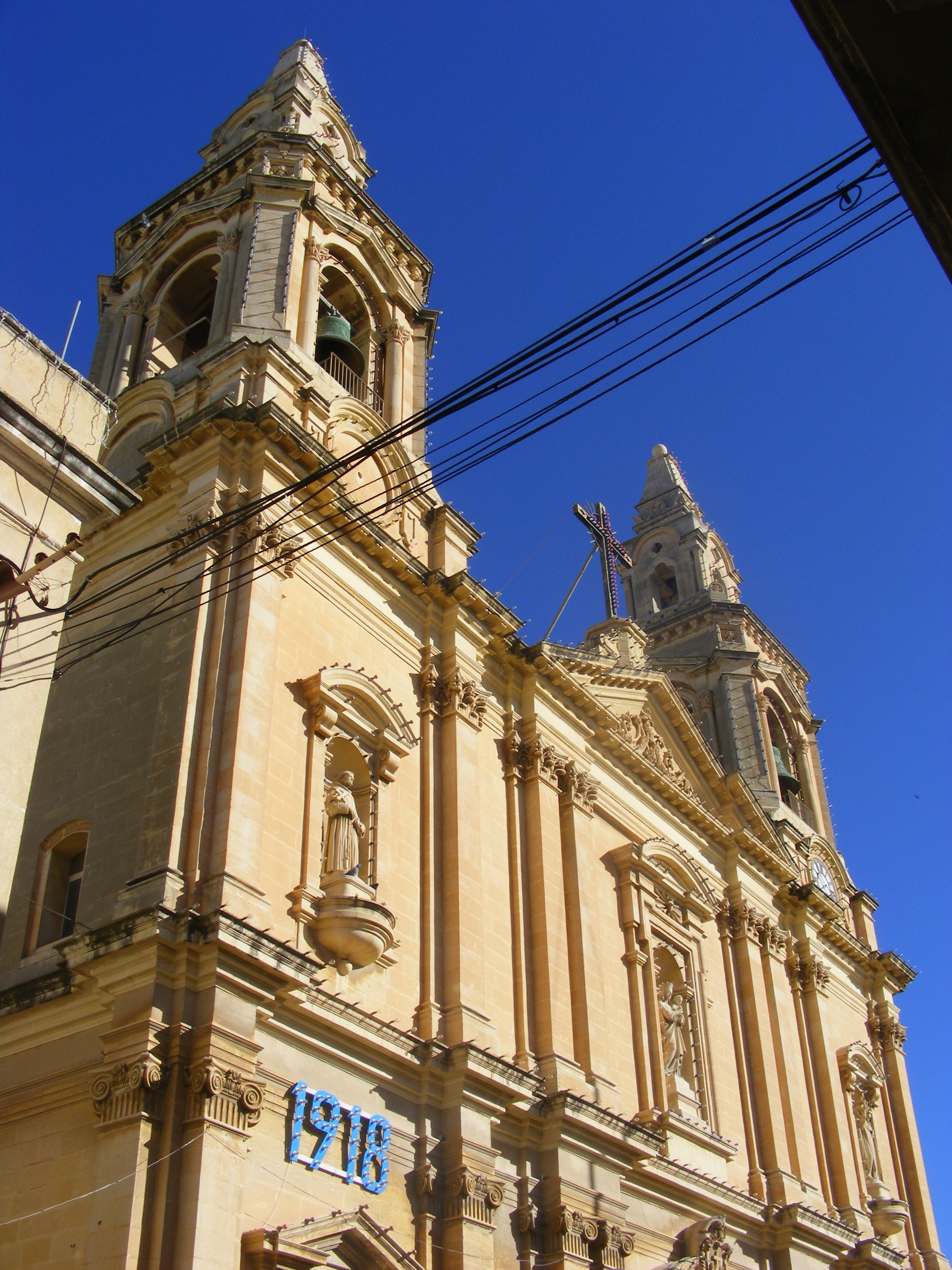
Sacro Cuor, Sliema

- Our Lady of the Sacred Heart Parish Church (Sacro Cuor) - The Sanctuary of Our Lady of the Sacred Heart in Sliema, Malta was founded in 1877, and has been a parish church since 1918.
- Jesus of Nazareth Parish Church (Ġesù Nazzarenu)
- St Gregory the Great Parish Church (San Girgor)
- The Chapel of Our Lady of Graces

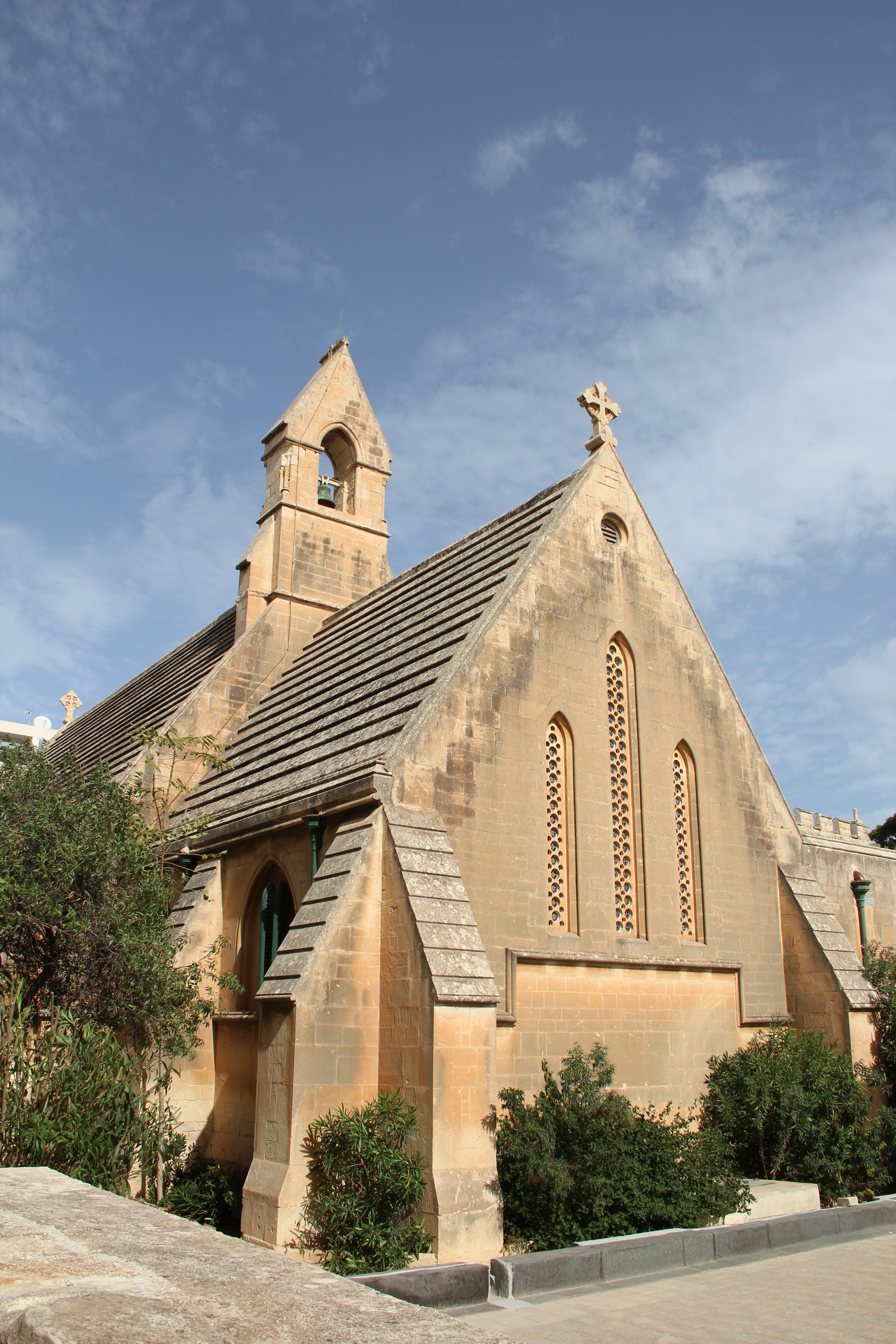
Holy Trinity Church, Sliema

- The Church of the Holy Trinity (Anglican) - The Church of the Holy Trinity is a Church of England church in Sliema, Malta which was built to resemble an English village church and opened in 1866.
- Fort Tigné - Fort Tigné (Maltese: Il-Forti Tigné - Il-Fortizza ta' Tigné) is a polygonal fort in Tigné Point, Sliema, Malta. It was built by the Order of Saint John between 1793 and 1795 to protect the entrance to Marsamxett Harbour. It is among the oldest polygonal forts still standing. The fort, altered by the British in the 19th century, remained in use by the military until 1979.
- Tigné Point - Tigné Point is a peninsula in Sliema, Malta. The area was originally occupied by several fortifications and a British barracks complex, which were left derelict for many years, until the area was redeveloped in the early 21st century. The area now contains many modern buildings used by both locals and tourists.

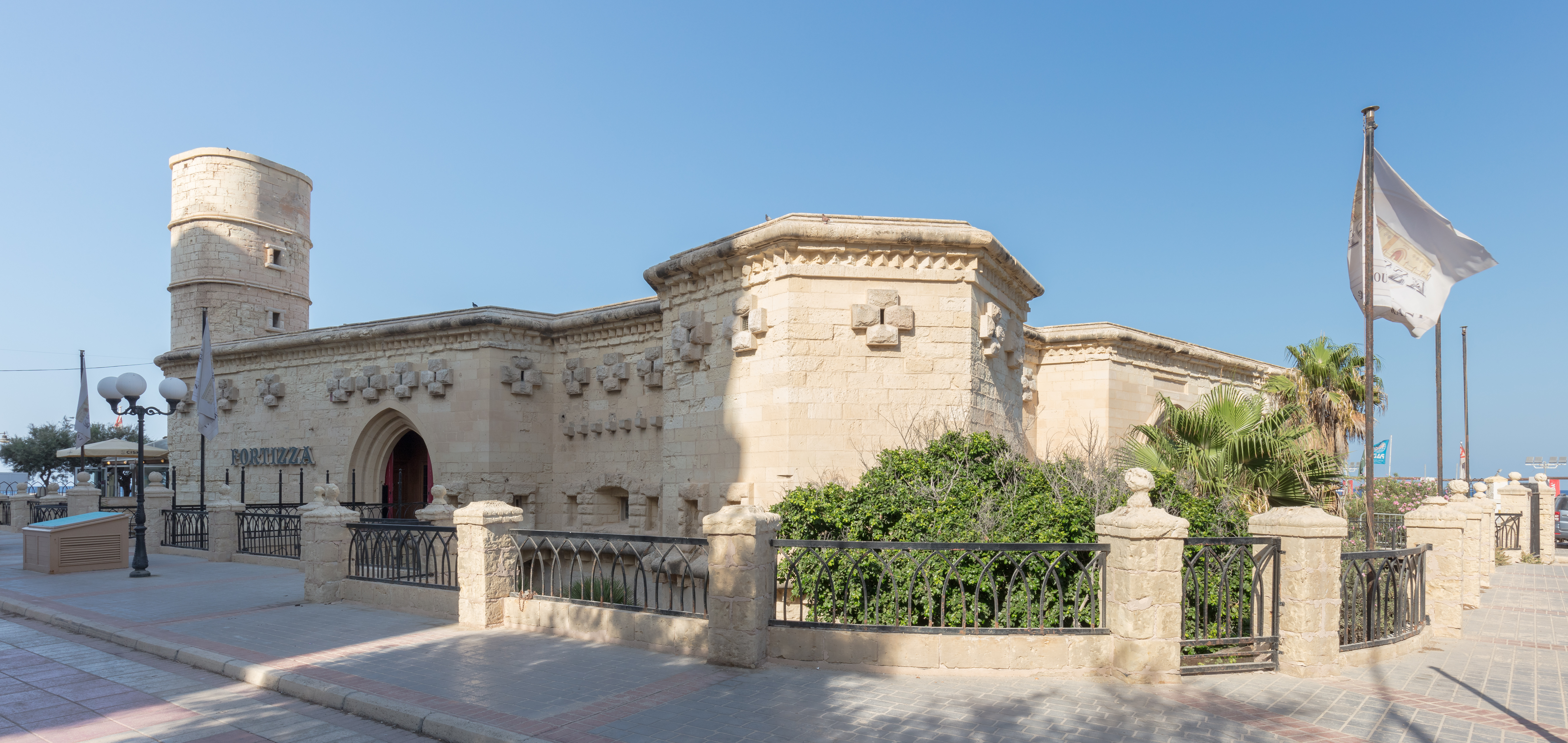
Il-Fortizza, Sliema 2021

- Sliema Point Battery (Il-Fortizza) - Sliema Point Battery (Maltese: Batterija tal-Ponta ta' Tas-Sliema), also known as Fort Sliema (Maltese: Il-Fortizza ta' Tas-Sliema), is an artillery battery in Sliema, Malta. It was built by the British between 1872 and 1876. The battery stands on the peninsula that separates Marsamxett Harbour from St. Julian's Bay. The battery was later used as a searchlight position, and it is now a restaurant known as Il-Fortizza (The Fortress)
- Garden Battery - Garden Battery is an artillery battery in Sliema, Malta. It was built by the British between 1889 and 1894. The battery is located at Tigné Point, between Cambridge Battery and Fort Tigné.
- St. Julian's Tower - Saint Julian's Tower (Maltese: Torri ta' San Ġiljan), originally known as Torre di San Giuliano[1] and also known as Sliema Tower (Maltese: Torri tas-Sliema), is a small watchtower in Sliema, Malta. It was completed in 1658 as the fifth of the 13 De Redin towers. An artillery battery was built around the tower in 1715. Today, the tower and the remains of the battery are a restaurant.
- Palazzo Capua - Palazzo Capua, also known as Capua Palace, is an early 19th-century Neoclassic palace in Sliema, Malta. It was built by Biagio Tagliaferro, a banker and philanthropist regarded as a founding figure of Maltese maritime commerce. Tagliaferro named the building Selma Hall. It later came into the possession of the Prince of Capua Carlo de Borbon, and his wife Penelope Caroline Smyth, for whom it is still named today.
- Exiles Beach
- The Salesian Theatre

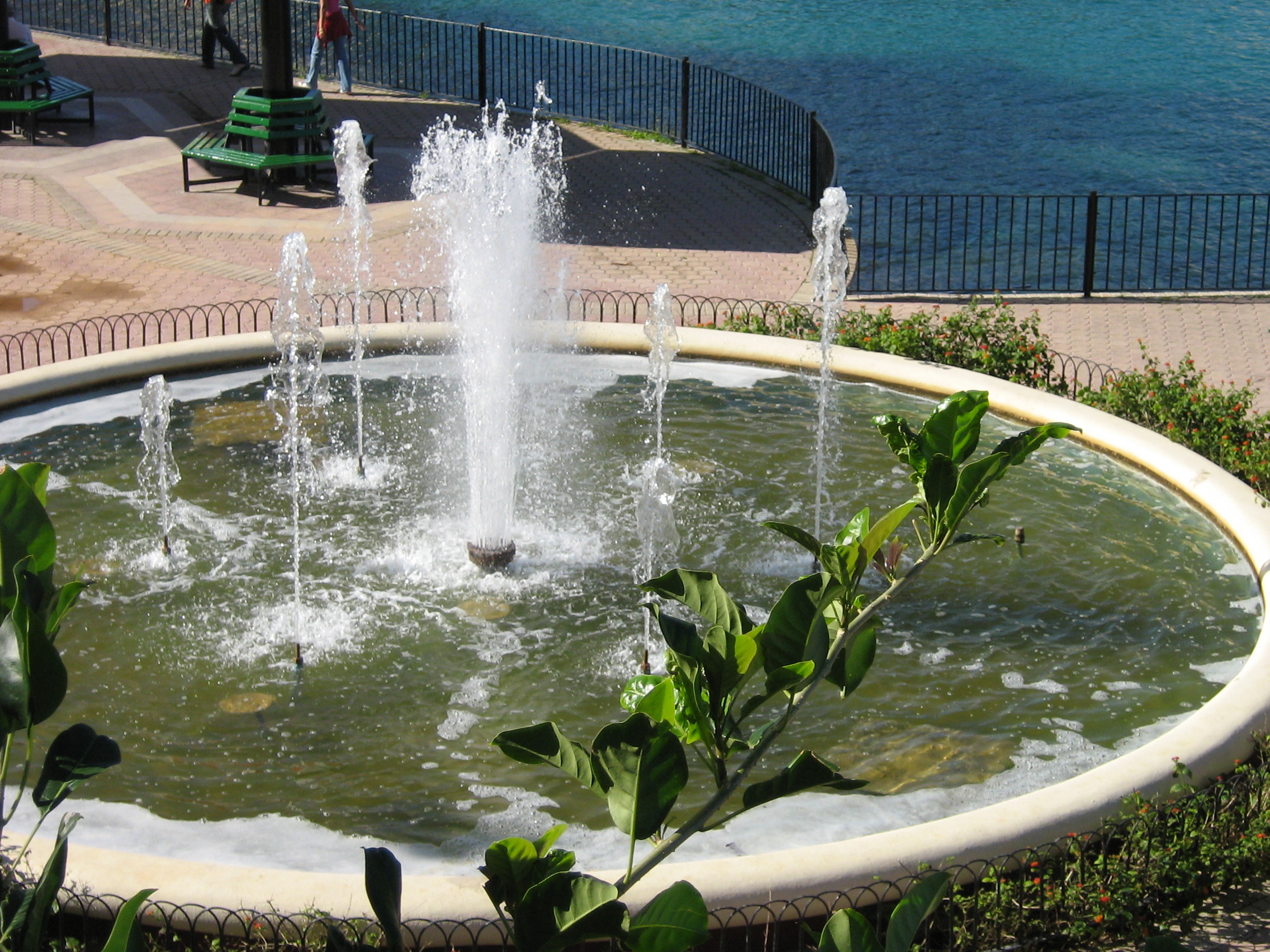
Independence Gardens in Sliema

- Independence Gardens (Ġnien l-Independenza)
- The Three Trees (It-Tliet Siġriet)
- Annunciation Square (Triq il-karmu)
- Chalet (now demolished)
- Bugeja Buildings (Trejqet Emilio Lombardi)
- Piazza San Andrian Dingli (Triq San Andrian Dingli)
- Villa Bonici

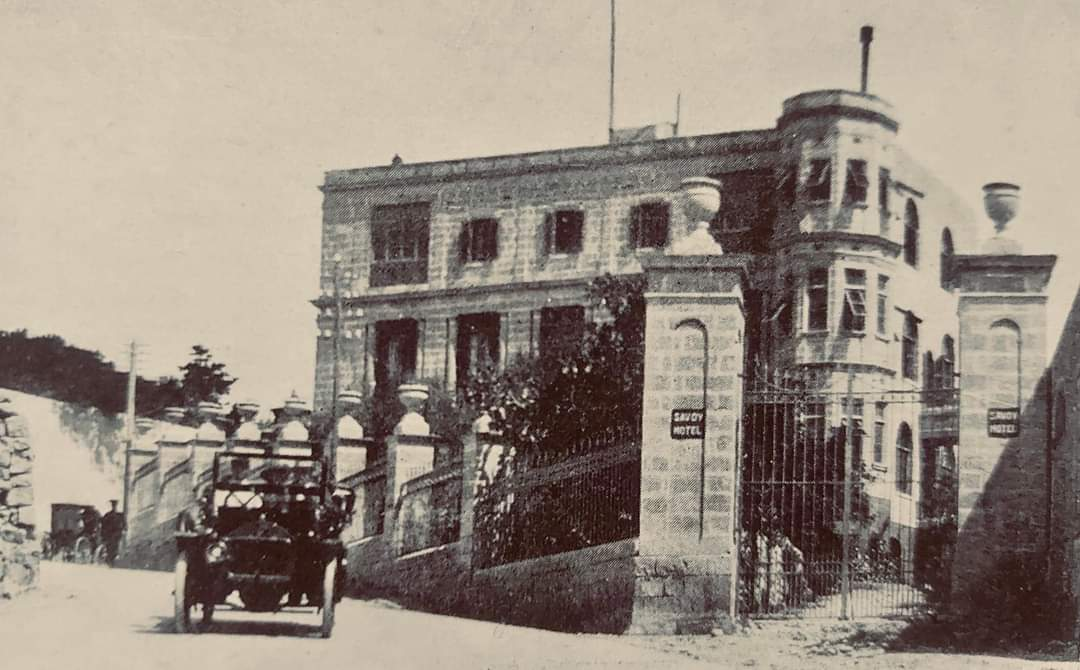
Hotel Savoy, Sliema 1915

- Old Savoy Hotel - The Old Savoy Hotel dates back to the 18th century. It is found in the Sliema-Gżira border.
- The Imperial - The Imperial is a building which houses old people it is an icon. The land on which it stands was first acquired by Pietru Pawlu Galea in a temporary emphyteusis for 99 years which was later extended to 149 years.

== Churches ==
Sliema has a number of Roman Catholic churches such as the one dedicated to Jesus of Nazareth known as In-Nazzarenu, three dedicated to Our Lady: Our Lady of the Sacred Heart, Our Lady of Mount Carmel and Stella Maris (the oldest Roman Catholic church in Sliema, dating from 1855) and one dedicated to Pope Gregory I.

In addition is the Anglican Holy Trinity Church, built in 1866, in Rudolphe Street.

== Culture ==
=== Feasts ===
As is common in Maltese towns and villages, Sliema holds annual parish feasts. Four main societies contribute to local traditions in Sliema, held in honour of the Our Lady Stella Maris (August), Our Lady of the Sacred Heart (Madonna tas-Sacro Cuor) in July, Our Lady of Mount Carmel (July) and St. Gregory The Great (September).

=== Band clubs ===
Sliema has four band clubs which take part in the parish feasts held in the summer and are active all year round. These societies are Stella Maris Band Club (founded in 1914), The "Societa' Filarmonica SLIEMA" Band Club (founded in 1923), St. Gregory Band Club (1987) and Mount Carmel Band Club (1987).

=== Scouting ===
The 1st Sliema Scout Group (Bernard's Own) is the oldest surviving scout group outside the United Kingdom. It was founded in 1909 by Sir Edgar Bernard. It remains an influence Scouting in Malta.

They wear a red scarf, representing the main colour of the Sliema Coat of Arm, and wear a blue t-shirt.

== Sports ==
=== Football ===
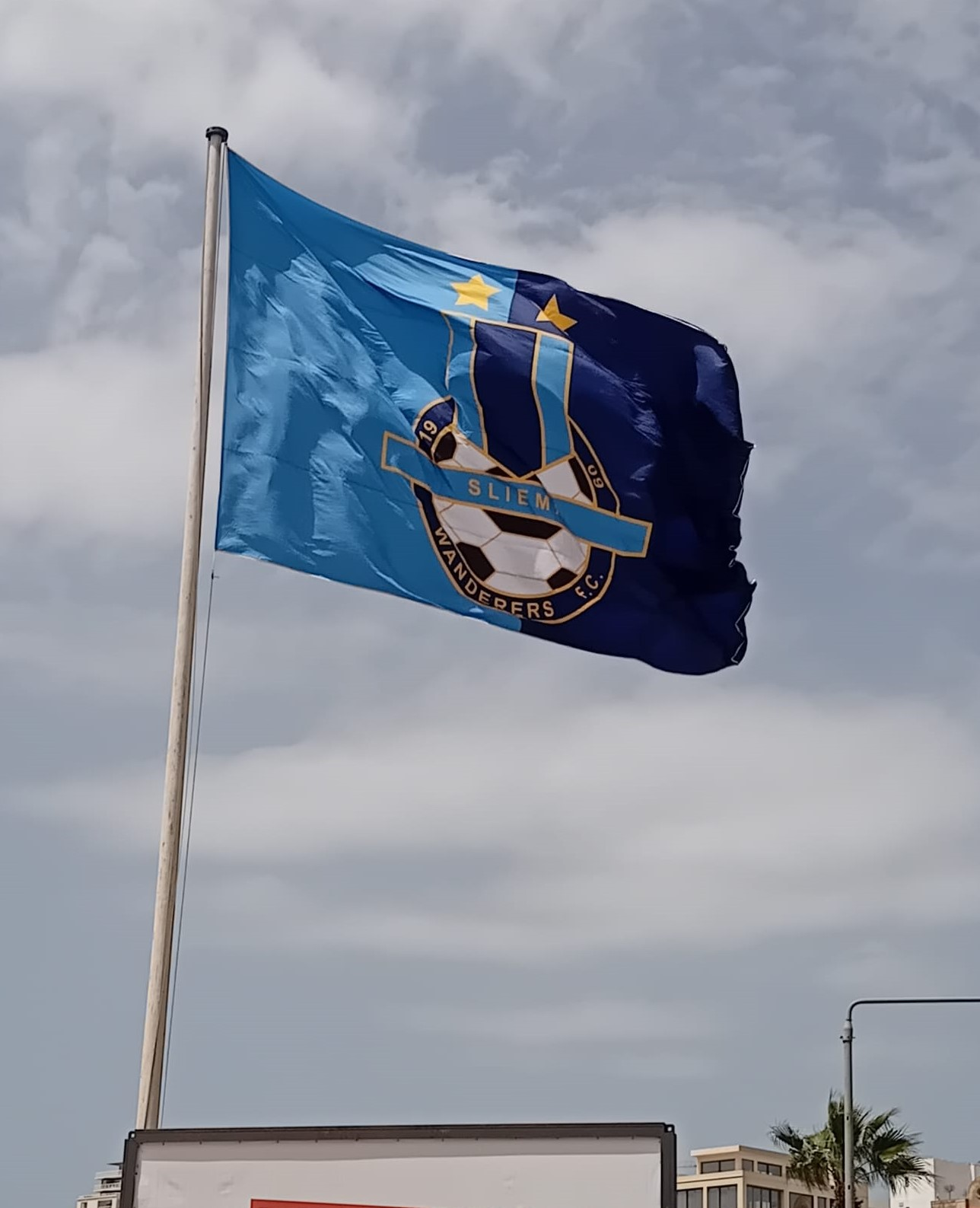

Sliema Wanderers holds the record for the most Maltese Premier League titles (26 championships) and the most FA Trophy victories (21 titles).

Club Overview: Founded: 1909. League: Maltese Premier LeagueCurrent President: Walter Arciola (Appointed June 2026)Current Manager: Branko Nisevic (Appointed June 2026) Primary Stadium: Ta' Qali National Stadium (The club is also currently advancing infrastructure expansion plans at Tigne Point to build ancillary sports facilities, indoor padel courts, and commercial spaces). Club Colors: Blue and White

Historical Significance: Sliema Wanderers hold deep roots in the island's sporting history, having competed in Malta's first-ever top-flight league season in 1909–10. They achieved the nation’s first "quadruple crown" during the 1923–24 season and became the first Maltese club to win a European Cup match, defeating Greek giants Panathinaikos 1–0 in 1965. While their absolute domestic dominance peaked in the 20th century, they secured a notable three-peat of league titles between 2003 and 2005.

Recent Status & 2026/27 Campaign: Following a 5th-place finish in the 2025–26 Maltese Premier League campaign, the club underwent an administrative restructure in mid-2026, appointing Walter Arciola as president and Branko Nisevic as manager. In the summer 2026 transfer market, the club signed Malta international forward Luke Montebello and Croatian midfielder Roko Prša. The 2026/27 season is currently in progress.

=== Beach Soccer ===
The latest team to come out of Sliema, Sliema Beach Soccer, competes in the national beach soccer league.

=== Futsal ===
Sliema also has its very own futsal team: Sliema Futsal Fort Fitness. They now currently play in the 2025-26 Maltese Futsal League and are third in the challengers league, a few points behind Santa Venera Lightnings Futsal.

=== Waterpolo ===
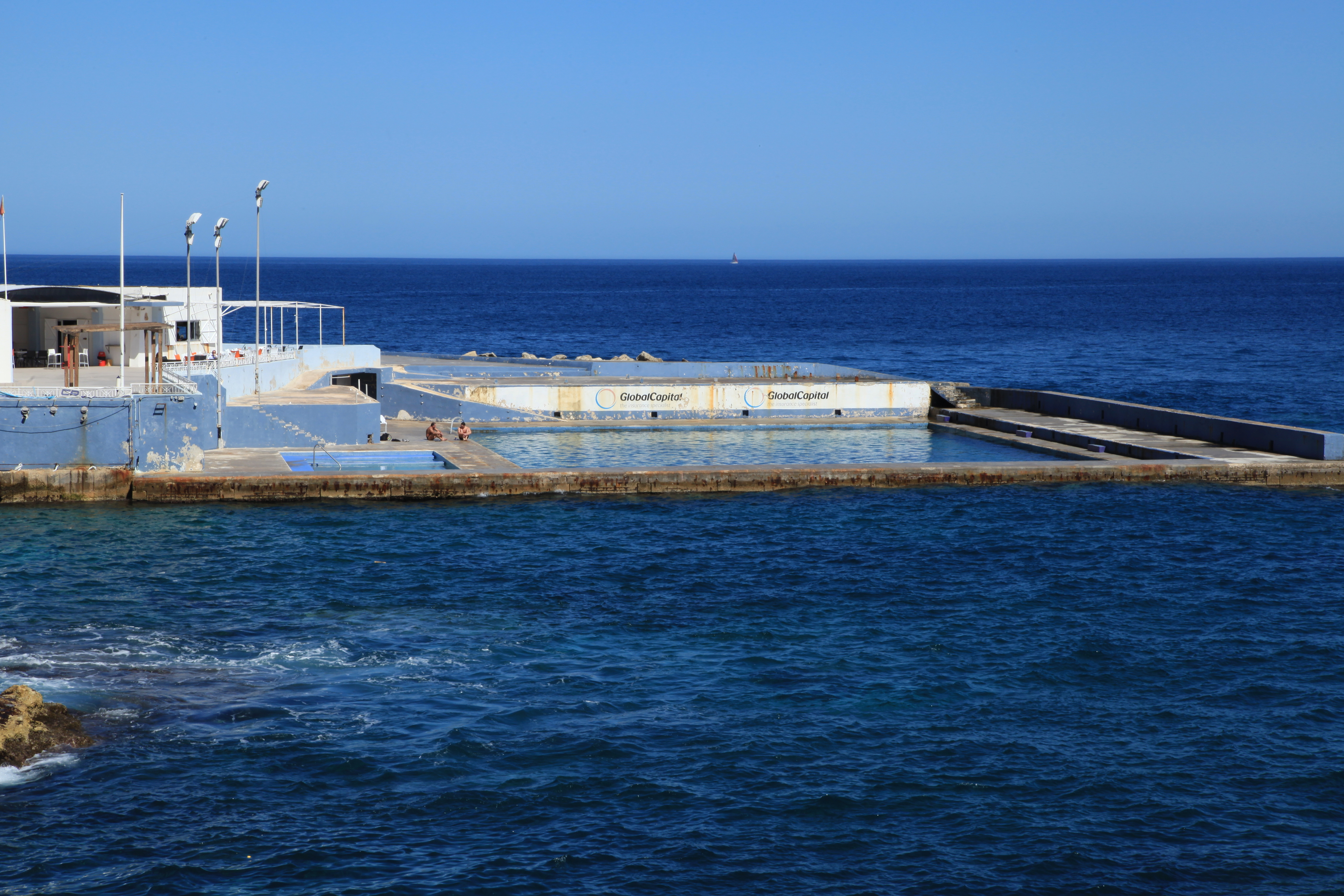
Sliema Waterpolo Pitch

Sliema Aquatic Sports Club is also the leading club in water polo, winning a total of 32 leagues and 27 cups since 1912. Their main rivals are the Balluta Bay Side Neptunes WPSC.Sliema Aquatic Sports Club is also a swimming club where a number of swimmers have trained, some of whom became national record holders. They placed 3rd in the Waterpolo Challenger Cup 2025-26, beating Enka 17-15 in the 3rd place game. Another team hailing from Sliema is Exiles S.C. Sliema also have a futsal team: Sliema Futsal Fort Fitness.

=== Rugby ===
Sliema is also represented in rugby by Stompers RFC. Sliema Fight Co., formerly based within the Preluna Hotel complex and now operating as Malta Fight Co., is located within the Sliema Wanderers FC training ground and has its own boxing, kickboxing, BJJ, Muay Thai and mixed martial arts teams.

=== Calisthenics ===
The Sliema promenade features public outdoor exercise facilities, including an open-air calisthenics park situated near Exiles Bay adjacent to Ġnien l-Indipendenza (Independence Gardens) on Tower Road. Maintained as part of local public health initiatives, the spot provides free access to bodyweight training equipment — including pull-up bars, parallel bars, and incline benches — along the seafront.

== Zones in Tas-Sliema ==
- The Ferries
- Font Għadir
- Fortina
- Għar id-Dud
- Qui-Si-Sana
- Savoy
- Surfside
- The Strand
- Tlett Siġriet
- Lazy Corner
- Tigné Peninsula
- Tigné Point
- Exiles

== Transport ==
=== Buses ===
Sliema is served by Malta Public Transport, including route TD13 or Airport Direct, which serves Malta International Airport. More routes to Valletta: 13, 13A (a shorter version of route 13 this terminates in San Julian), 14, 15(from ferries), 16 and 21 (from ferries). Other routes such as 202 go to ir-Rabat, and 211 to Rahal il-Gdid serving also the industrial area of Kordin. Route 225 to Golden bay, 222 to Cirkewwa Ferry terminal, route 110 to the hospital alongside 233 which also stops at the University of Malta.

=== Ferry ===
A ferry service operates to Valletta. There are also other private ferry services operating from Sliema. Starting from the 5th of May, a Fast Ferry service will be introduced between Sliema, Bugibba and Gozo.

=== Roads ===
Sliema's main roads include:

- Ix-Xatt (The Strand) 127
- Triq Bisazza (Bisazza Street – a pedestrian commercial street)
- Triq il-Kbira (Main Street) 127
- Triq it-Torri (Tower Road) 127
- Triq Manwel Dimech (Manoel Dimech Street)
- Triq Rudolfu (Rodolph Street)
- Triq Sir Adrian Dingli (Sir Adrian Dingli Street)
- Xatt ta' Tigné (Tigné Waterfront)
- Xatt ta' Qui-Si-Sana (Qui-Si-Sana Waterfront)
- Pjazza Annunzjata
- Pjazza Sant'Anna

=== Cycling ===
Cycling is common on the Sliema Promenade. This extends for 2 km along the coast of Sliema. Independence Gardens is also a common place for cycling.

== Notable people ==
- Lola Brown (born 2007), footballer
- Daphne Caruana Galizia (born 1964), Journalist
- Ira Losco (born 1981), Singer
- Robert Abela (born 1977), Prime Minister of Malta
- Percy Alexander MacMahon (Born 1854), Mathematician

== Twin towns – sister cities ==
Sliema is twinned with:

- Białystok, Poland
- Muret, France
