= Language Studies International =

Language training company

Language Studies International LSI
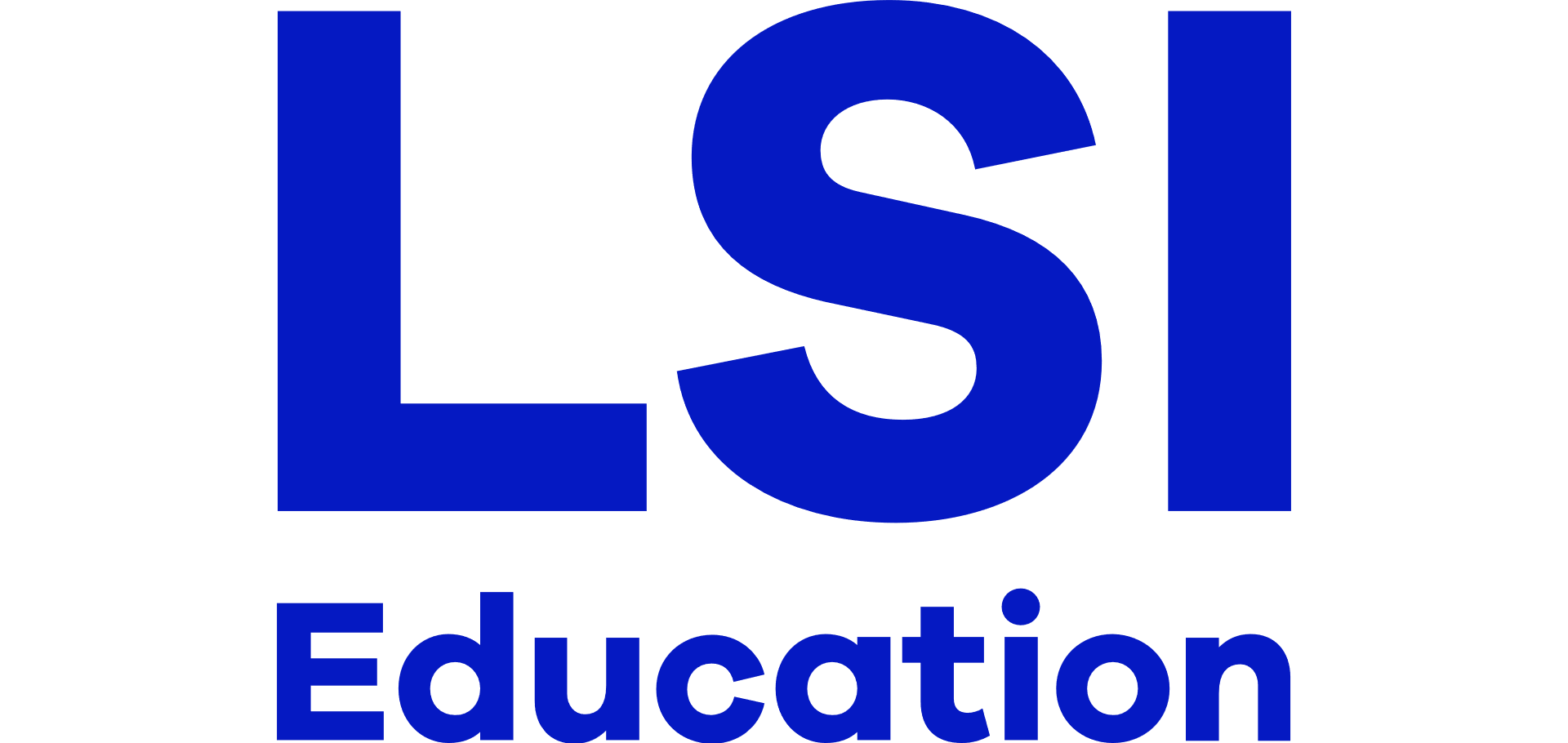
- Company type: Private Limited Company (sole proprietorship)
- Industry: Education/ Language Teaching
- Founded: 1965
- Headquarters: London, UK
- Number of locations: 14
- Services: Language training in English, French, German, Exam Preparation, University Pathway Service, Languages Courses for Juniors
- Website: http://www.lsi.edu

Language Studies International (LSI), also known as LSI Education, is an international company with its registered headquarters in the UK. LSI specialises in the provision of language training to students on study abroad programmes. The company currently runs 14 language schools and operates in the UK, United States, Canada, Australia, New Zealand, France and Switzerland offering general and specialised language courses in English, French and German.

== History ==
Language Studies Ltd was founded in 1965 by an ex-army education officer, who opened the inaugural language school in Kensington, London in premises previously occupied by the Thai Embassy. A few years later the company was purchased by the Thomson Corporation, former owners of The Times and Sunday Times magazine, who expanded the company adding a second school in Paris. Both schools provided one-to-one tuition in a range of languages to private individuals. In 1970 Language Studies Ltd was bought by the Immanuel family. The new owners relocated the London school to Oxford Street and recognising a niche in the market began providing language training to large corporations and government departments. New mini group courses, ‘Group 5’, were set up in larger premises opened in Hampstead in 1975 and a few years later in Brighton.

In the late 1970s Language Studies (or Language Studies International as it became known in 1987) began to focus on ESL teaching and the provision of study abroad programmes . In 1980 LSI started a joint venture with The Two Cities Club in Zurich, Switzerland and in the same year opened the first US school in Berkeley, California. According to Language Studies International's CEO, David Immanuel, LSI was one of the first British language schools to expand into North America and to offer study abroad programmes with a homestay option. This decision to expand into the North American market was prompted by the availability of cheap ‘walk on’ air fares offered by the airline TWA. "I thought that this might be the time for young Europeans to diversify from UK schools when preparing for the [Cambridge] FCE and so it proved when we opened in Berkeley, California,".

LSI opened a school in Christchurch in New Zealand in 2006 but following the 2011 Christchurch earthquake many buildings in the surrounding Central Business District were designated as unsafe, preventing access to the school. Students were relocated to the school in Auckland but the long term viability of the school was severely affected causing the permanent closure of the school in 2011

In September 2016, following a partial merger with LTC, LSI acquired additional school premises in Brighton and closed down the LTC schools based in London.

== Language training for juniors ==
In 2012, in response to growing demand for language programmes for juniors, LSI developed specially adapted programmes targeted at younger learners. Following the success of the initial programme run at the London Hampstead school, the programme was rolled out to include all US and Canadian schools and Cambridge offering both residential and non residential options to students. Some ESL schools, including LSI, have also rolled out Family programmes to cater for the recent demand in family language courses where both parents and children can study in age appropriate classes in the same location.
