= Tigné Point =

Peninsula in Sliema, Malta

Coordinates: 35°54′24.77″N 14°30′44.40″E

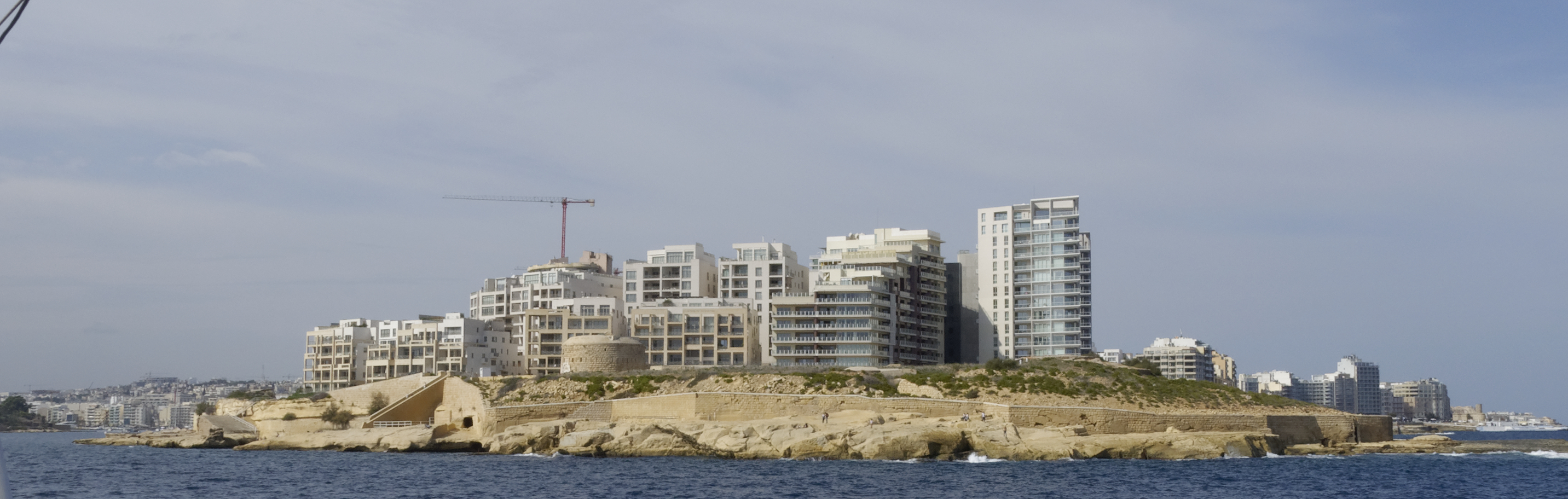
View of Tigné Point

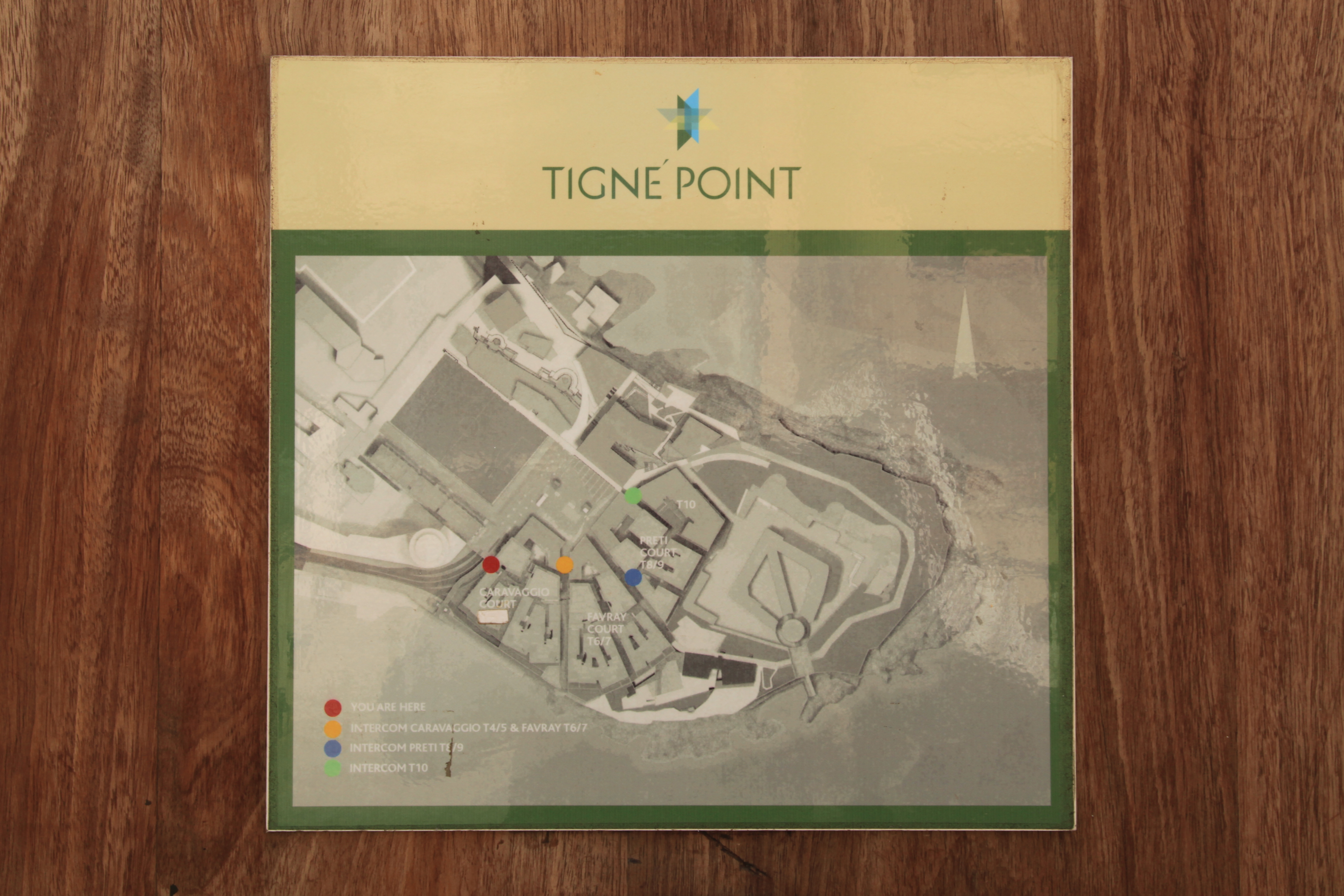
Map of Tigné Point

Tigné Point is the tip of Tigné peninsula in Sliema, Malta. The area was originally occupied by several fortifications and a British barracks complex, which were left derelict for many years, until the area was redeveloped in the early 21st century. The area now contains many modern buildings and is popular among both locals and tourists.

The peninsula was originally known as Punta di Santa Maria, and its extremity is also known as Dragut Point.

== History ==
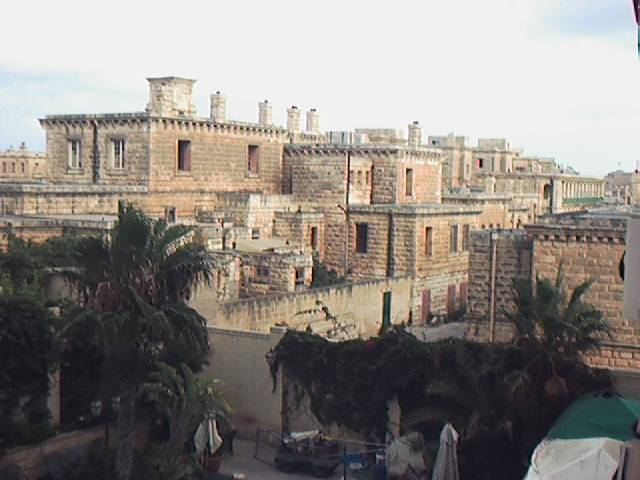
Tigné Barracks, before its demolition in 2001

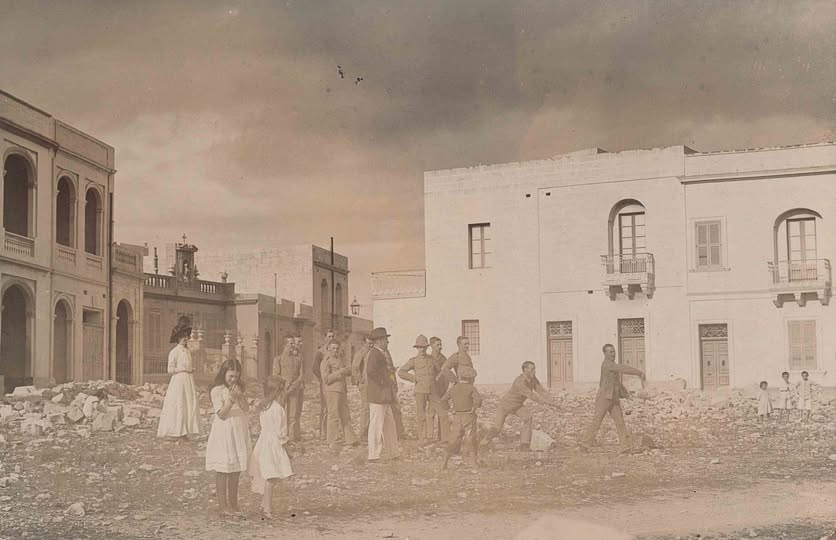
Playing bocci at Tigne’, 1910s

The local militia had a small watch post on what is now Tigné Point in 1417. During the Great Siege of Malta of 1565, the Ottoman admiral Dragut stationed a number of cannons at Tigné Point in a siege to capture Fort Saint Elmo from the Order of Saint John. He was killed by stray gunfire from the fort during the siege, and the extremity of the peninsula still bears his name, Dragut Point.

After the Great Siege, a chapel dedicated to Our Lady under various titles was built instead of a niche that was already in the area. In 1757, Lembi Battery was built in the area, and it became obsolete in 1792, when the Order built its last major fortification, Fort Tigné. The new fort, which later gave the area its name, played a significant role in the French invasion of 1798 and the subsequent Maltese uprising.

Between 1878 and 1886, when Malta was under British rule, Cambridge Battery was built on Tigné Point to house a single 100-ton gun. In the 1890s, Garden Battery was built to cover the area between Cambridge Battery and Fort Tigné. The British also built military barracks and a chapel dedicated to St. Luke on the peninsula.

When the British forces left in 1979, the barracks and the whole area fell into decay and neglect. Parts of both Fort Tigné and the British barracks were plundered or vandalized. Garden Battery was buried and buildings were constructed over it, while Cambridge Battery was used as a restaurant, hotel and swimming pool.

== Present day ==
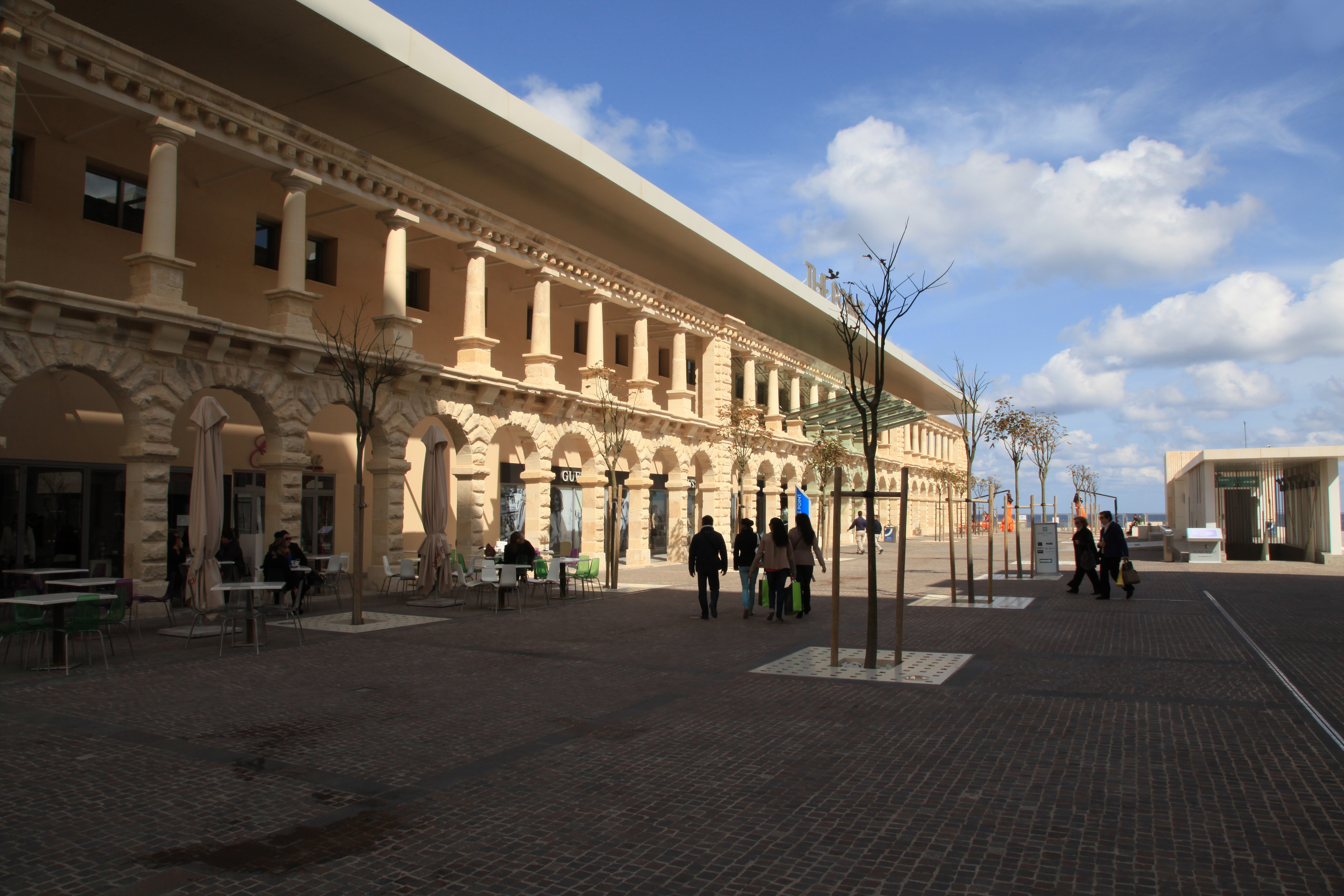
Parts of The Point Shopping Mall still include some architectural elements from the former Tigné Barracks.

Since the redevelopment project, Tigné Point has changed considerably. The modern buildings, easy accessibility and other factors helped transform the area from neglected abandoned barracks to a popular area which is frequented by both locals and tourists as it has a number of attractions. The Fort Cambridge apartments, which were completed in 2012, are among the tallest buildings in Malta.

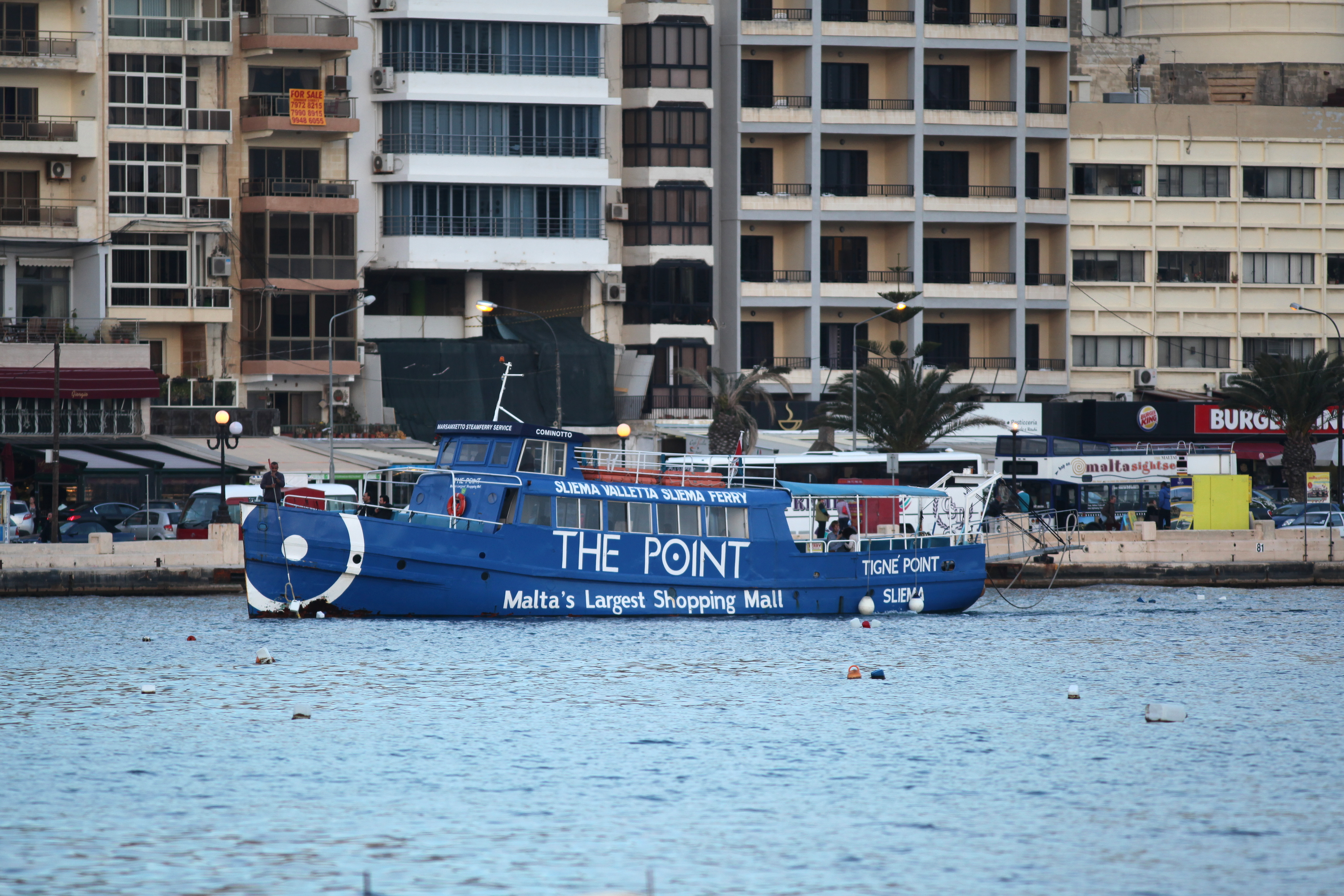
The ferry boat Cominotto with an advert for The Point Shopping Mall.

The Point Shopping Mall opened in early 2010, built on the site of the former Tigné Barracks. Parts of the mall in Pjazza Tigné still contain some architectural elements of the barracks, including a series of arches that run along the square. The Point is Malta's largest shopping mall and it contains about 17,000m^{2} of retail floor space spread over three levels. It includes a supermarket and over 50 other shops.
