= Cambridge Battery =

- Batterija ta' Cambridge
- Tigné Point, Sliema, Malta
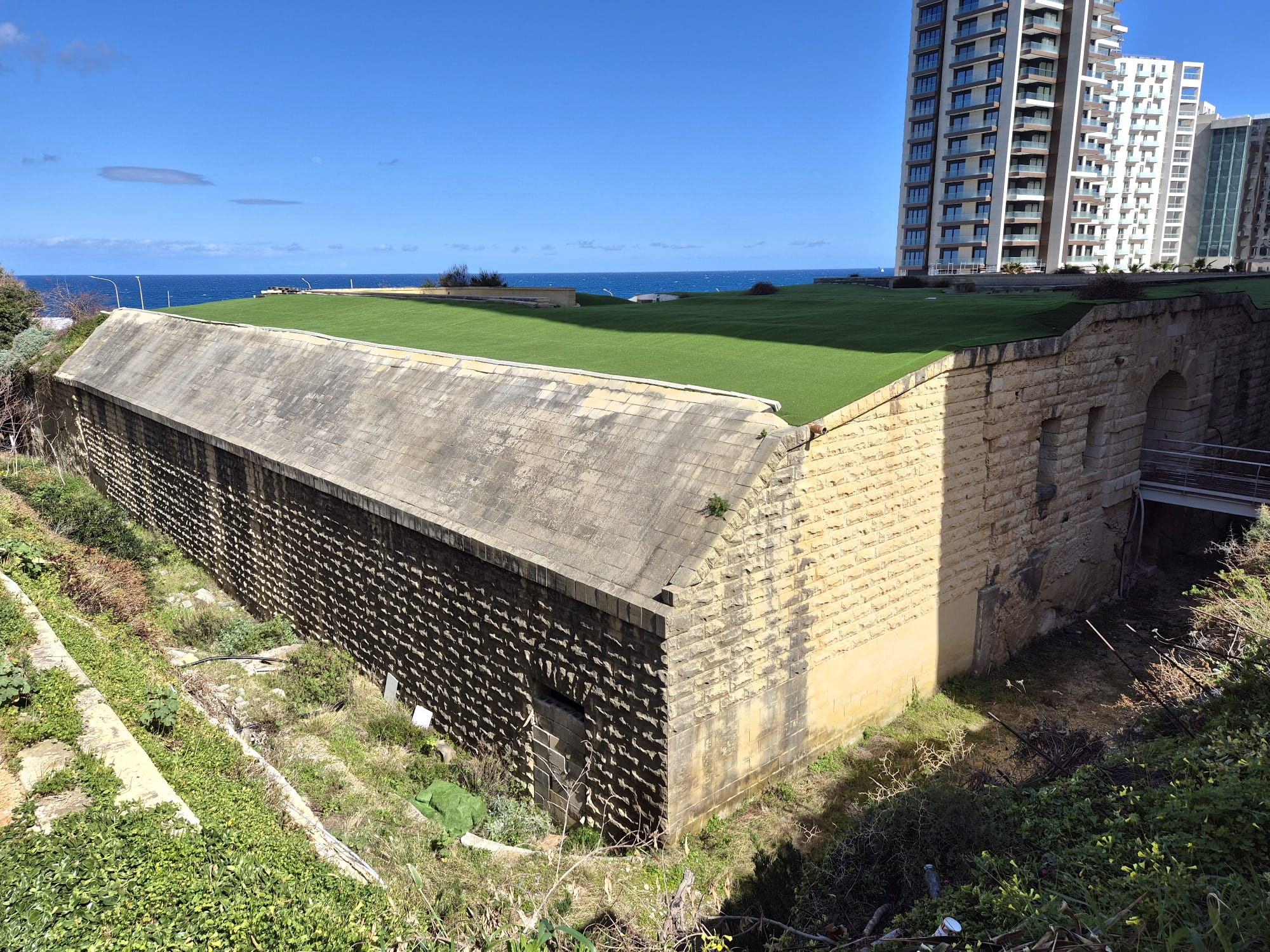
- Cambridge Battery in 2026, with the main entrance to the right

Site information
- Type: Artillery battery
- Open to the public: No
- Condition: Intact

Location
- Coordinates: 35°54′32.8″N 14°30′35″E
- Area: 6,300 m^{2} (68,000 sq ft)

Site history
- Built: 1878–1886
- Built by: British Empire
- In use: 1884–1906
- Materials: Limestone and concrete

Cambridge Battery (Maltese: Batterija ta' Cambridge) is a Victorian-era battery in Sliema, Malta. It is commonly referred to as Fort Cambridge (Maltese: Forti Cambridge), although it was never classified as a fort while in use. It originally contained an Armstrong 100-ton gun.

== History ==
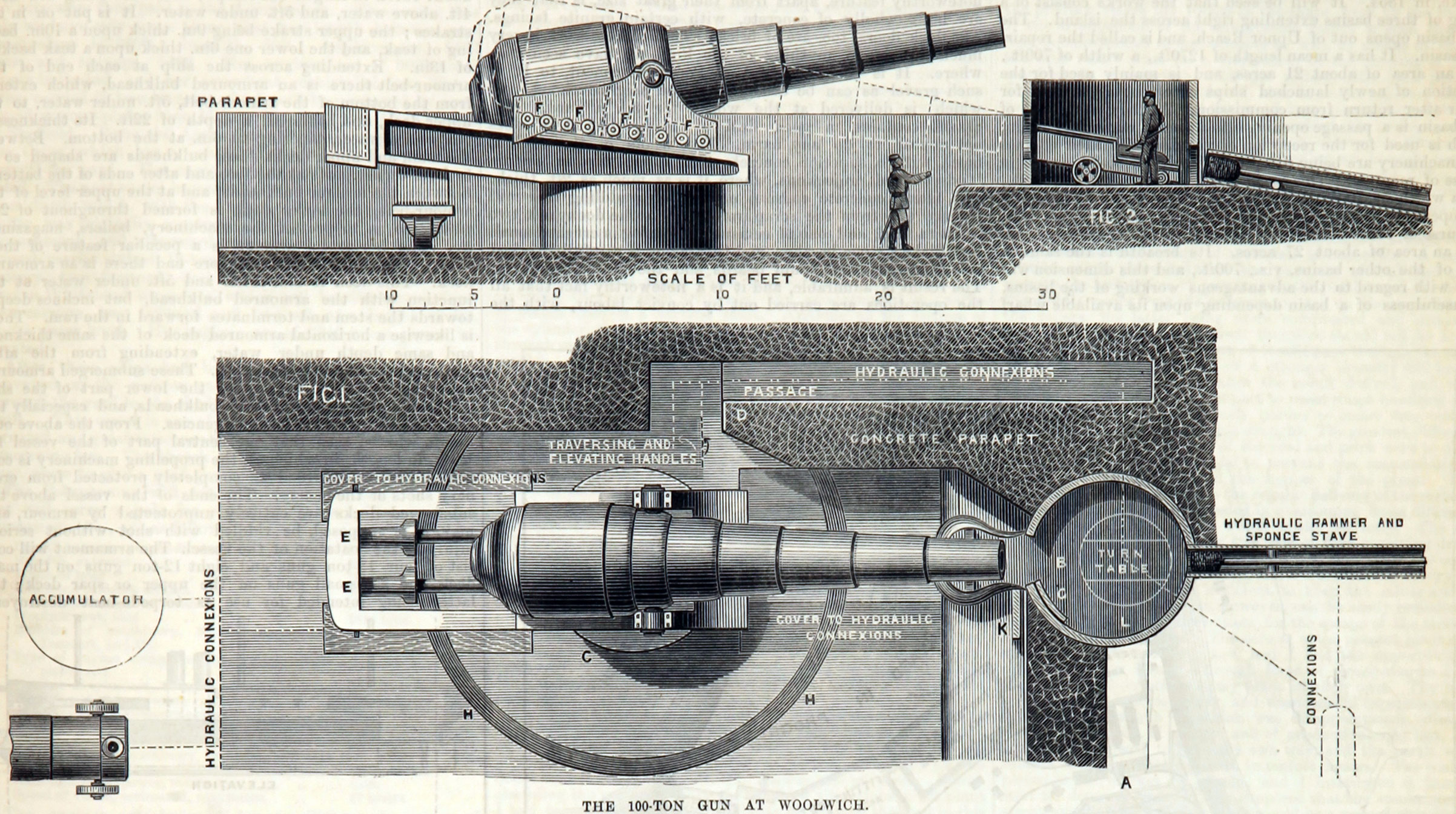
A 100-ton Armstrong Gun like the one formerly located at Cambridge Battery

Cambridge Battery was built by the British between 1878 and 1886 above the shore west of the mouth of Grand Harbour, between Sliema Point Battery and Fort Tigné. Construction started on 28 August 1878, and the gate was built in 1880. The battery was completed on 27 November 1886, and construction had cost some £18,819.

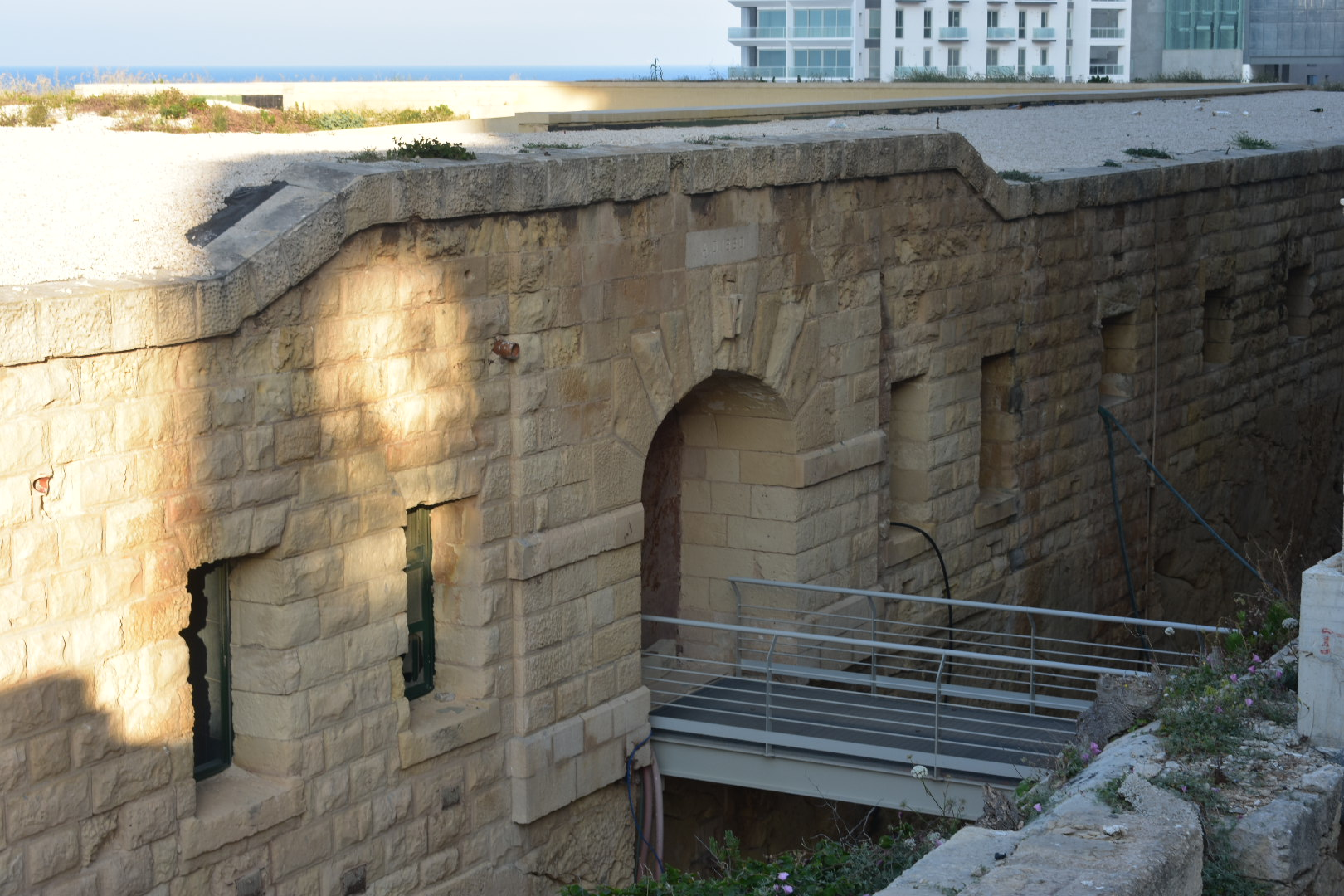
The main entrance with the bridge

The battery was built to contain a single Armstrong 100-ton gun: a 450 mm rifled muzzle-loading (RML) gun made by Elswick Ordnance Company, the armaments division of the British manufacturing company Armstrong Whitworth. The battery was paired with Rinella Battery near Kalkara, east of Grand Harbour. The British installed a second pair of 100-ton guns to defend Gibraltar, mounting one each in Victoria Battery (1879) and Napier of Magdala Battery (1883), which did not have Cambridge or Rinella's self-defence capabilities. The gun at Cambridge was eventually scrapped, and today only two 100-ton guns survive, at Rinella and Napier of Magdala.

The British felt the need for such large guns as a response to the Italians having, in 1873, built the ironclads Duilio and Enrico Dandolo with 22 inches of steel armour and four 100-ton Armstrong guns per vessel. By arming both Gibraltar and Malta, the British were seeking to ensure the vital route to India through the Mediterranean and the Suez Canal, which had opened to traffic in 1869.

The battery itself is modest in size as it was designed to operate and protect the single large gun, with its associated gun crew, magazines, bunkers, support machinery and the detachment of troops stationed within the fort to defend the installation. The battery could also be supported from gun fire from the nearby Fort Manoel and Fort Tigné.

The gun was mounted en barbette on a wrought-iron sliding carriage and gun fired over the top of the parapet of the emplacement. This enabled the gun-crew to handle and fire the gun without exposing themselves to enemy fire. The battery was designed to engage enemy warships at ranges up to 7,000 yards. The low profile of the battery and the deeply buried machinery rooms and magazines were intended to enable it to survive counterfire from capital warships.

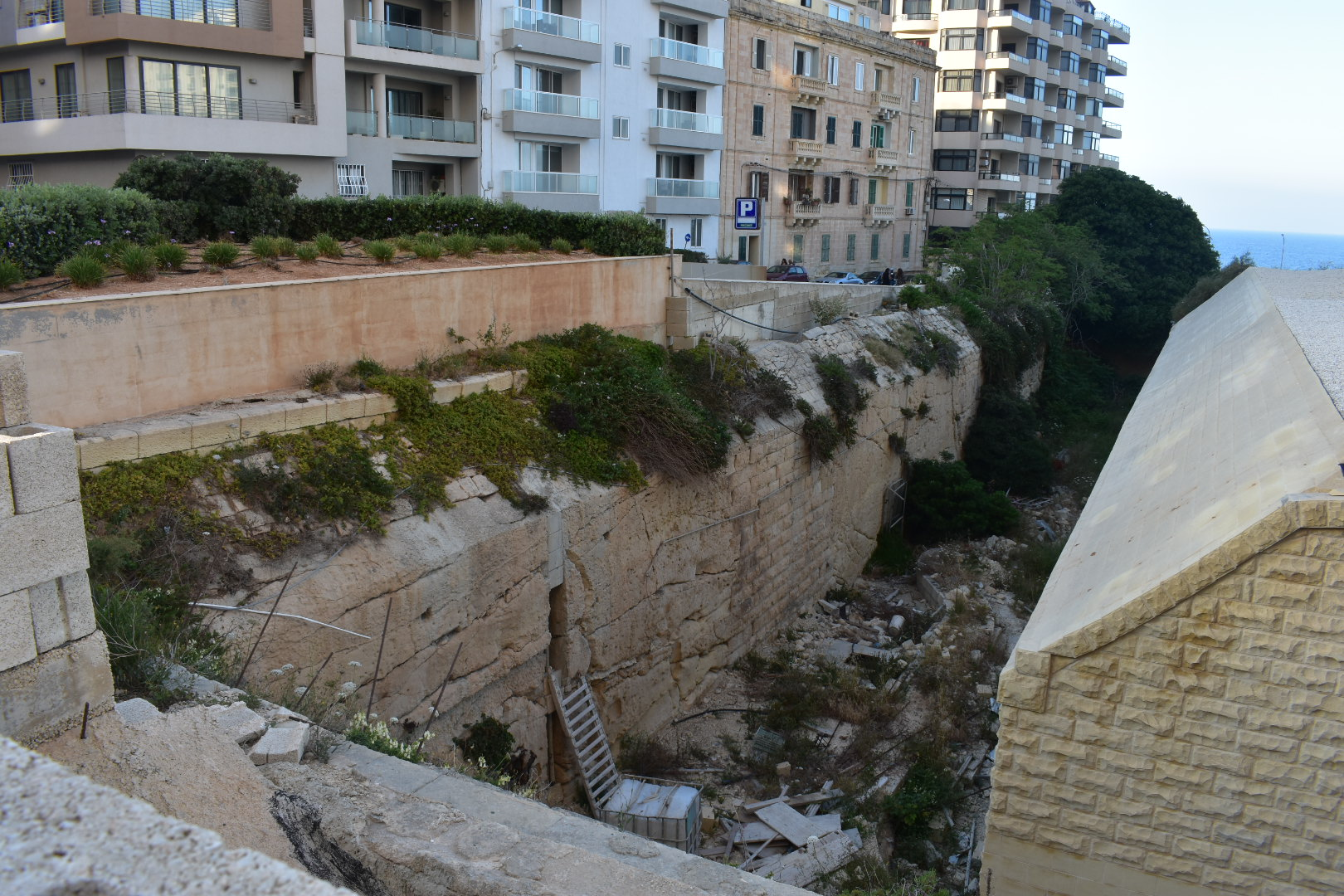
The dilapidated ditch of the battery, pictured in 2018

The battery has no secondary armament; its fortifications - simply ditches, caponiers, a counter-scarp gallery and firing points - were intended mostly for small arms fire and grenades.

Originally the inner faces of the emplacement were revetted with masonry. Subsequent review of the battery's defences after its completion identified this as a weakness, and the stone revetting was removed from most of the emplacement and replaced with plain earthworks, presumably to better absorb the energy of incoming shellfire. The revetting was retained around the loading casemates.

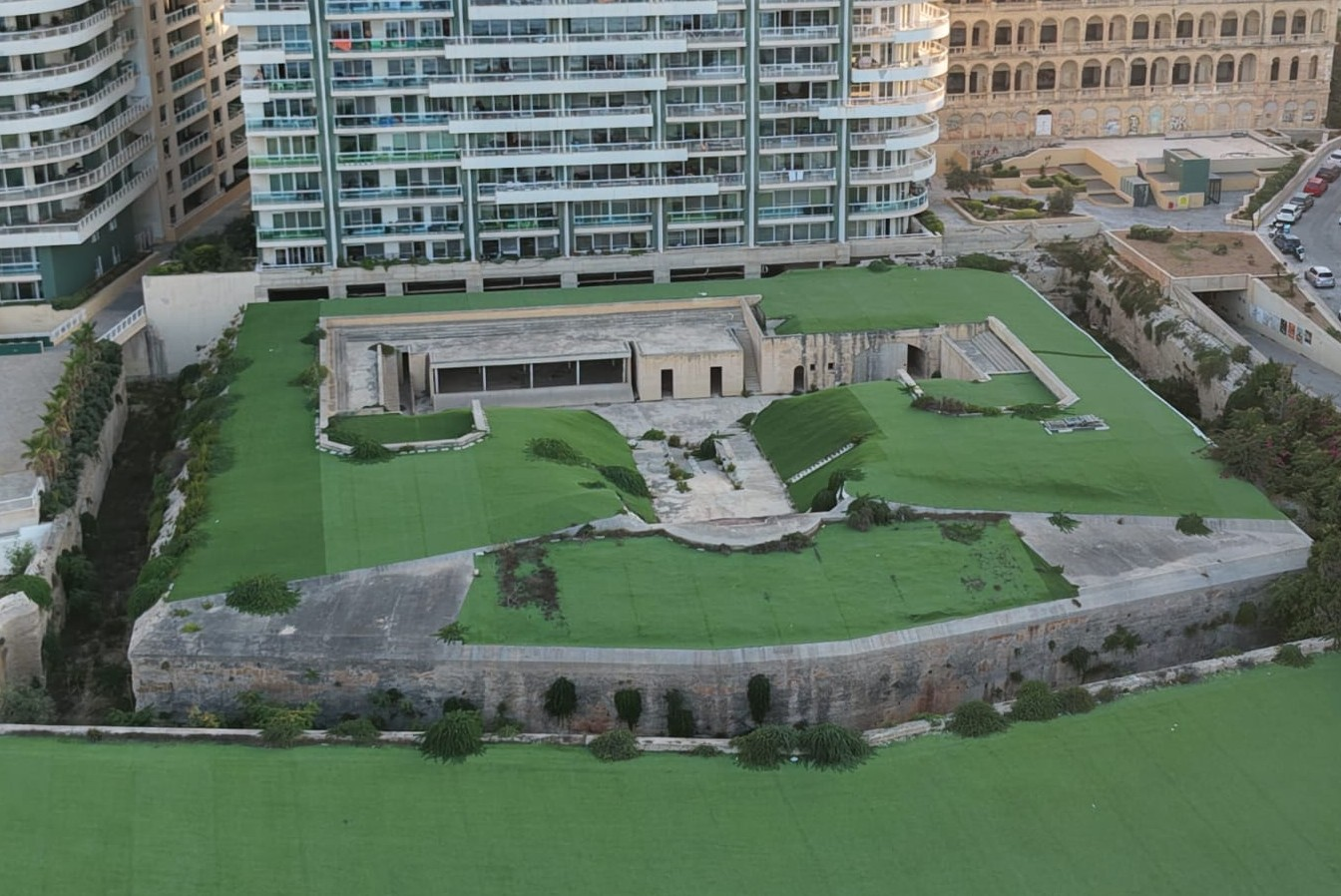
An aerial view of the battery and its surroundings, 2026

Cambridge's 100-ton gun arrived on 16 September 1882, and was mounted and ready for use on 20 February 1884. The work to make the machines serviceable was so great that until 1885 there were no firing tests. The first ammunition load comprised all the models available, included 50 AP and 50 HE. Shrapnel, once fired, was not replaced, being considered less effective. In 1887 and 1888 activity stopped due to the need to rework hydraulic systems, but nevertheless these guns were considered quite reliable. Because a single shell cost as much as the daily wage of 2,600 soldiers, practice firing was limited to one shot every 3 months. In 1889, Garden Battery was built close by to cover the area between Cambridge Battery and Fort Tigné.

The 100-ton gun was in active service for 20 years, and was last fired in 1903 or 1904, before being withdrawn from active service by 1906, without ever firing a shot in anger.

The gun remained at Cambridge Battery for many years. In 1956, it was cut up and sold for scrap, as part of a programme to scrap all unnecessary ordnance in Malta's fortifications (in which hundreds of guns, both ancient and modern, were destroyed).

Eventually, the Holiday Inn Crowne Plaza Hotel came to occupy part the site of the battery. A restaurant was built, and this was later gutted to make space for outdoor and indoor pools and other hotel facilities. Although these developments damaged the battery, a significant amount of its original structures remained.

== Present day ==
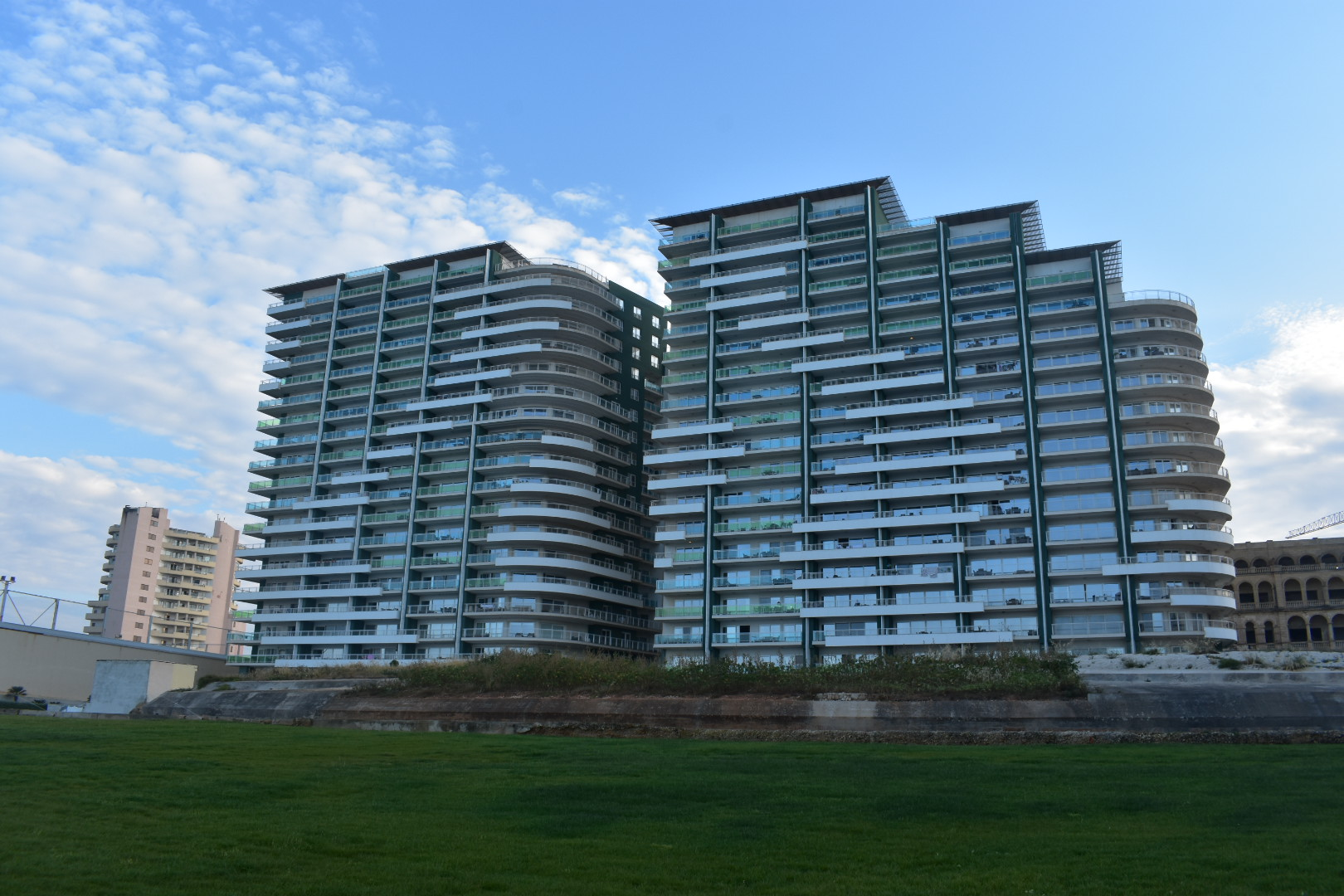
Fort Cambridge apartments with the battery below

In the 2000s, the area around the battery began to be developed by GAP Developments plc, as seafront apartments known as Fort Cambridge were built close to the battery. In 2007, the developers were given 10 years to restore the battery and turn it into a tourist attraction.

Despite this, the only restoration work done to date has been the demolition of the hotel structures built on the battery, and the removal of vegetation. Amid concerns over lack of restoration, GAP Developments plc has stated that it is committed to the restoration of the battery, despite the slow pace of the works.
