= Fort Rinella =

Victorian battery in Kalkara, Malta

Rinella Battery
- Batterija ta' Rinella
- Kalkara, Malta
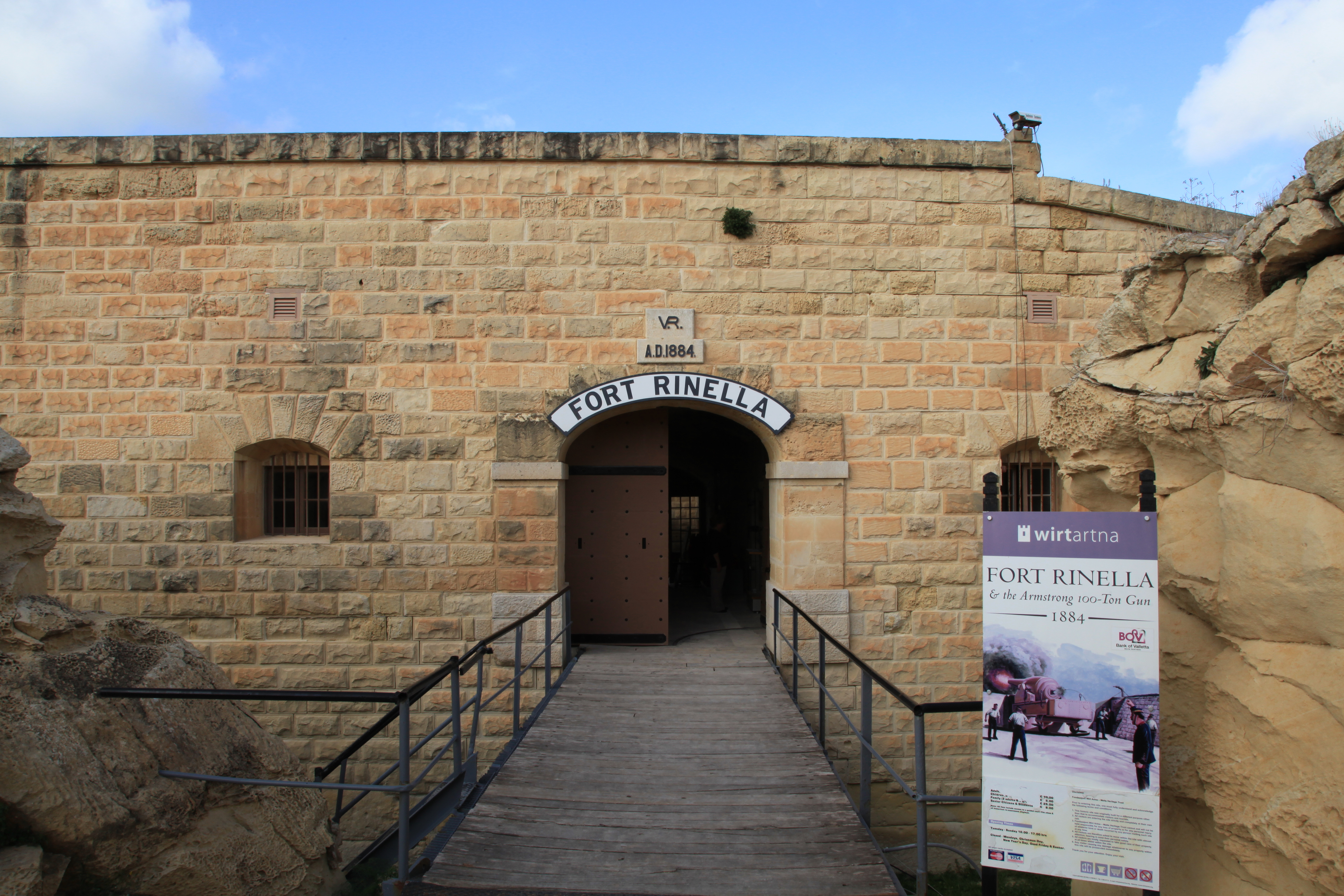
- Entrance to Rinella Battery

- Logo of the Fort Rinella museum

Site information
- Type: Artillery battery
- Operator: Fondazzjoni Wirt Artna
- Open to the public: Yes
- Condition: Intact
- Website: www.fortrinella.com

Location
- Coordinates: 35°53′40″N 14°31′57″E
- Area: 6,300 m^{2} (68,000 sq ft)

Site history
- Built: 1878–1886
- Built by: British Empire
- In use: 1886–1965
- Materials: Limestone and concrete

The Rinella Battery (Maltese: Batterija ta' Rinella) was a Victorian battery in Kalkara, Malta. It is commonly referred to as Fort Rinella (Maltese: Forti Rinella), although it was never classified as a fort while in use. It was armed with an Armstrong 100-ton gun, which survives; the only other surviving gun is at the Napier of Magdala Battery, Gibraltar.

== Description ==
The Rinella Battery was modestly sized, being designed to operate the single large gun. The fortifications were simple - ditches, caponiers, a counter-scarp gallery and firing points - and designed for infantry; there is no secondary armament. The battery's low profile and subterranean magazine and machinery spaces were protective measures against capital ship counterfire.

The gun was mounted en barbette on a wrought-iron sliding carriage, allowing the gun to be fired over the parapet without exposing the gun crew to enemy fire. Ammunition was fed from the magazine through elevators in each of the two loading casemate; there was one casement on each side of the gun. The expected range against warships was 7,000 yards.

The firing cycle was as follows:

1. An elevator transported a 2,000-pound shell and 450-pound silk cartridges containing black powder propellant into the loading casemate's loading chamber.
2. The gun slewed to a loading casemate and aligned the muzzle with the casemate's water pipe nozzle. The water cooled the gun and cleaned the barrel. The gun was depressed to drain the water.
3. The gun traversed and depressed to align the muzzle with the casemate's loading port, with the barrel pushing aside port's iron plate cover. The ramming mechanism pushed the shell and propellant charges from the loading chamber into the barrel, and tamped them.
4. The gun traversed and elevated back into firing position. An electrical firing mechanism was attached, making the gun ready to fire.

Even with two loading casemates feeding the gun, the intended rate of fire was once every six minutes.

It was impractical to manhandle such a heavy gun. Gun laying, the washing system, rammer, and ammunition elevators were powered by hydraulic machinery. The power plant was a stationary steam engine. Hydraulic pressure could be maintained by a backup 40-man manual pump.

The emplacement was completed with inner revetments of stone or masonry. Except for the loading casemates, the revetting was removed after being identified by reviews as weaknesses. They were replaced with plain earthworks, presumably to better absorb the energy of incoming shellfire.

== History ==
=== Early service ===
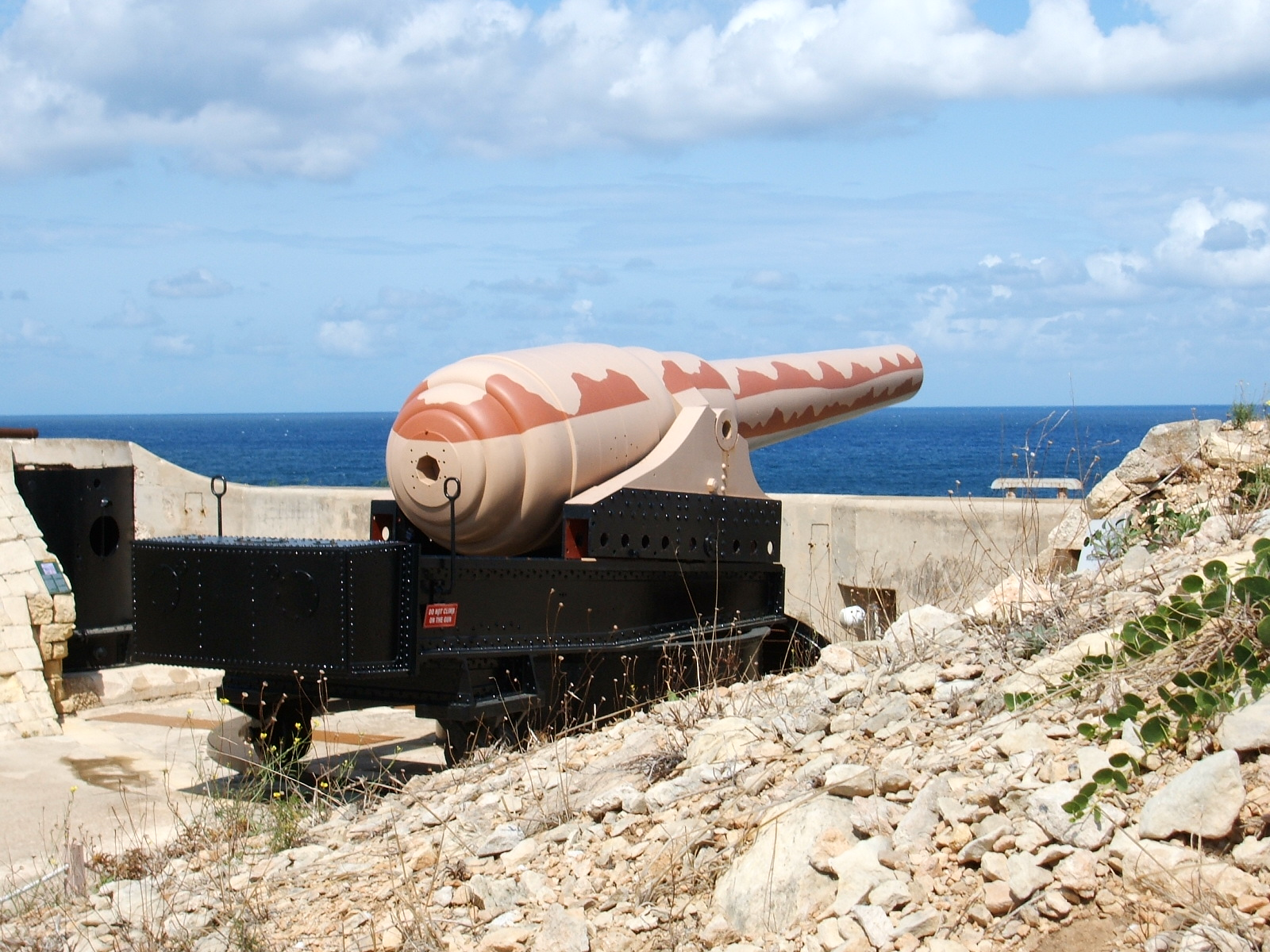
The Armstrong 100-ton gun

In 1873, Italy began construction of the two Duilio-class ironclads, each protected by 22-inches of steel armour and armed with four Armstrong 100-ton guns. These could threaten the sea lines of communication of the British Empire through the Mediterranean Sea; the Suez Canal provided a route to India after opening in 1869. In response, Britain constructed four batteries in the Mediterranean, each armed with a 100-ton gun: the Rinella and Cambridge Batteries at Malta, and the Victoria and Napier of Magdala Batteries at Gibraltar. Rinella was built between 1878 and 1886 above the shore east of the entrance to the Grand Harbour, between Fort Ricasoli and Fort St. Rocco. The Cambridge Battery was built near Tigné Point west of the harbour entrance.

The 100-ton gun arrived in Malta from Woolwich on 10 September 1882. It remained at the dockyards for some months before being ferried to Rinella Bay. Over the next three months one hundred men from the Royal Artillery manhandled it to the battery. The gun entered service in January 1884. Practice firing was limited to one shot every three months due to cost; each shell cost as much as the daily wage of 2600 soldiers. The gun fired for the last time on 5 May 1905 before being withdrawn from active service in 1906. It never saw action in 20 years of service.

=== After the 100-ton gun ===
Following the retirement of the 100-ton gun, Rinella became an observation post for Fort Ricasoli. Sometime after the obsolete steam engine and hydraulic system were removed.

Rinella was used as a Royal Navy supply depot during the Second World War. The battery's covering of moss and grass acted as camouflage; from the air it blended into the surrounding fields. Nonetheless, it received seven bomb hits.

The navy abandoned the site in 1965. In the 1970s, the battery was used as a location in the films Zeppelin (1971), Young Winston (1972) and Shout at the Devil (1976).

=== Museum ===
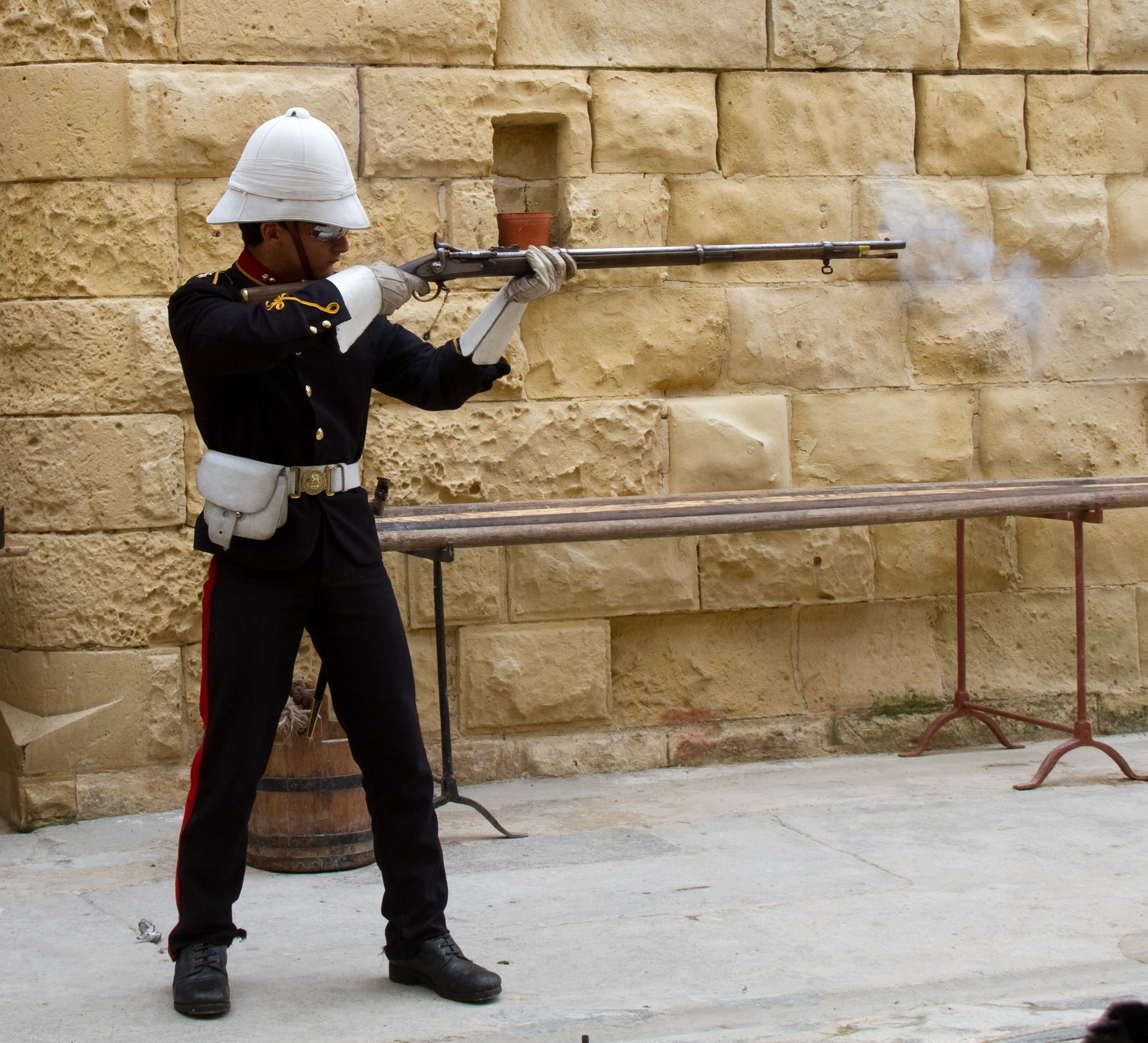
Re-enactment at Rinella Battery

The Rinella Battery was taken over by the Malta Heritage Trust (Maltese: Fondazzjoni Wirt Artna) in 1991. After restoration work it opened to the public as an open-air museum in 1996. The restored gun was fired for the first time in a hundred years on 21 November 2005 by Peter Caruana, the Chief Minister of Gibraltar, who is of Maltese descent. The gun is fired once a year with a blank black powder charge. The operating machinery has not been restored.

Throughout the year, between Monday and Saturday (10.00 - 17.00hrs) historical re-enactors dressed as 19th Century British soldiers provide regular guided tours along with a full-scale military re-enactment combining the live-firing of historic artillery and cavalry. The fort also has its audio-visual, audio guides in 14 languages and is fully interpreted. Members of the public are offered the opportunity of firing a cannon or a period musket or to sponsor a cavalry horse. This includes the firing, without shot, of a Victorian-era muzzle-loading fieldpiece.

In 2015, the battery was shortlisted as a possible site for the campus of the proposed American University of Malta. It was not chosen, and the campus is to be split up between Dock No. 1 in Cospicua and Żonqor Point in Marsaskala.

== Philately ==
In 2010 Malta and Gibraltar jointly issued a four-stamp set of stamps featuring the two jurisdictions' 100-ton guns. Two stamps show the gun at Fort Rinella, and two the gun at Napier of Magdala Battery. One of each pair is a view from 1882, and the other is a view from 2010. The stamps from Malta bear a denomination of €0.75, while those from Gibraltar bear a denomination of 75p.

== See also ==
- Bonavita, R. V., "The 100-ton Gun at Rinella Battery in Malta", Fort 1978 (Fortress Study Group), (6), pp26–34
