= Garden Battery =

Artillery battery in Malta

- Tigné Point, Sliema, Malta
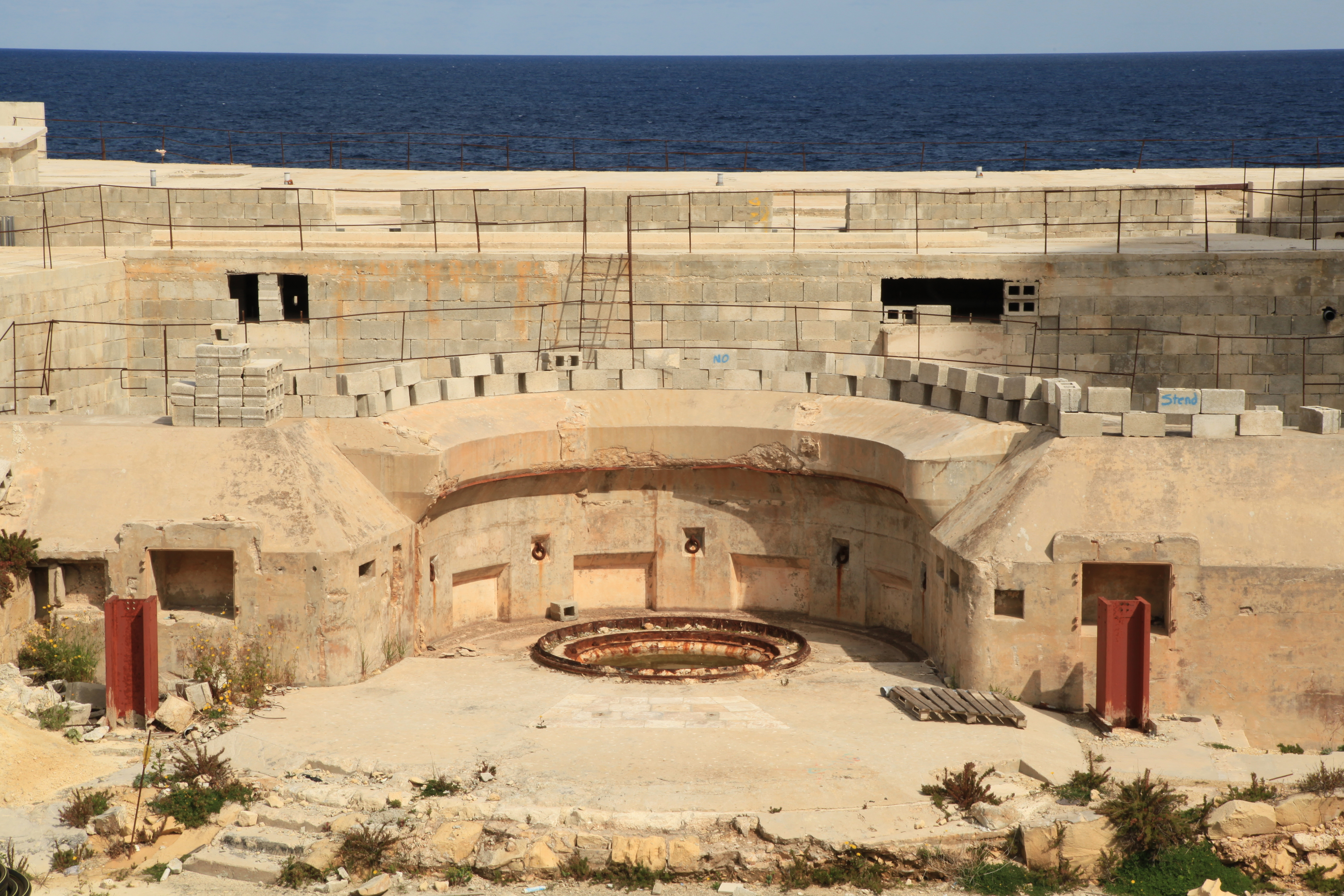
- Gun emplacement at Garden Battery in 2013

Site information
- Type: Artillery battery
- Open to the public: No
- Condition: Intact

Location
- Coordinates: 35°54′28.7″N 14°30′41.1″E

Site history
- Built: 1889–1894
- Built by: British Empire
- In use: 1894–1940s
- Materials: Concrete
- Battles/wars: World War II

Garden Battery is an artillery battery in Sliema, Malta. It was built by the British between 1889 and 1894. The battery is located at Tigné Point, between Cambridge Battery and Fort Tigné.

== History ==
The battery was first proposed in 1885, and was built between April 1889 and December 1894 at a cost of £7806, as part of a new series of fortifications meant to house breech-loading (BL) guns.

Garden Battery had a ditch connecting Fort Tigné with Cambridge Battery. It was armed with two 6 inch and one 9.2 inch BL guns on disappearing mounts. The 6 inch guns were located on the ends of the battery while the 9.2 inch gun was in the centre.

The battery's armaments were removed in 1907. From 1937, just before World War II, an anti-aircraft unit was stationed at the battery, and four QF 3-inch 20 cwt anti-aircraft guns were installed. These were removed in 1943, and the battery was decommissioned and handed to civil authorities some time later.

Eventually, the battery's ditch was filled in and other buildings were built over the glacis and gun emplacements. The battery was believed to have been destroyed.

== Present day ==
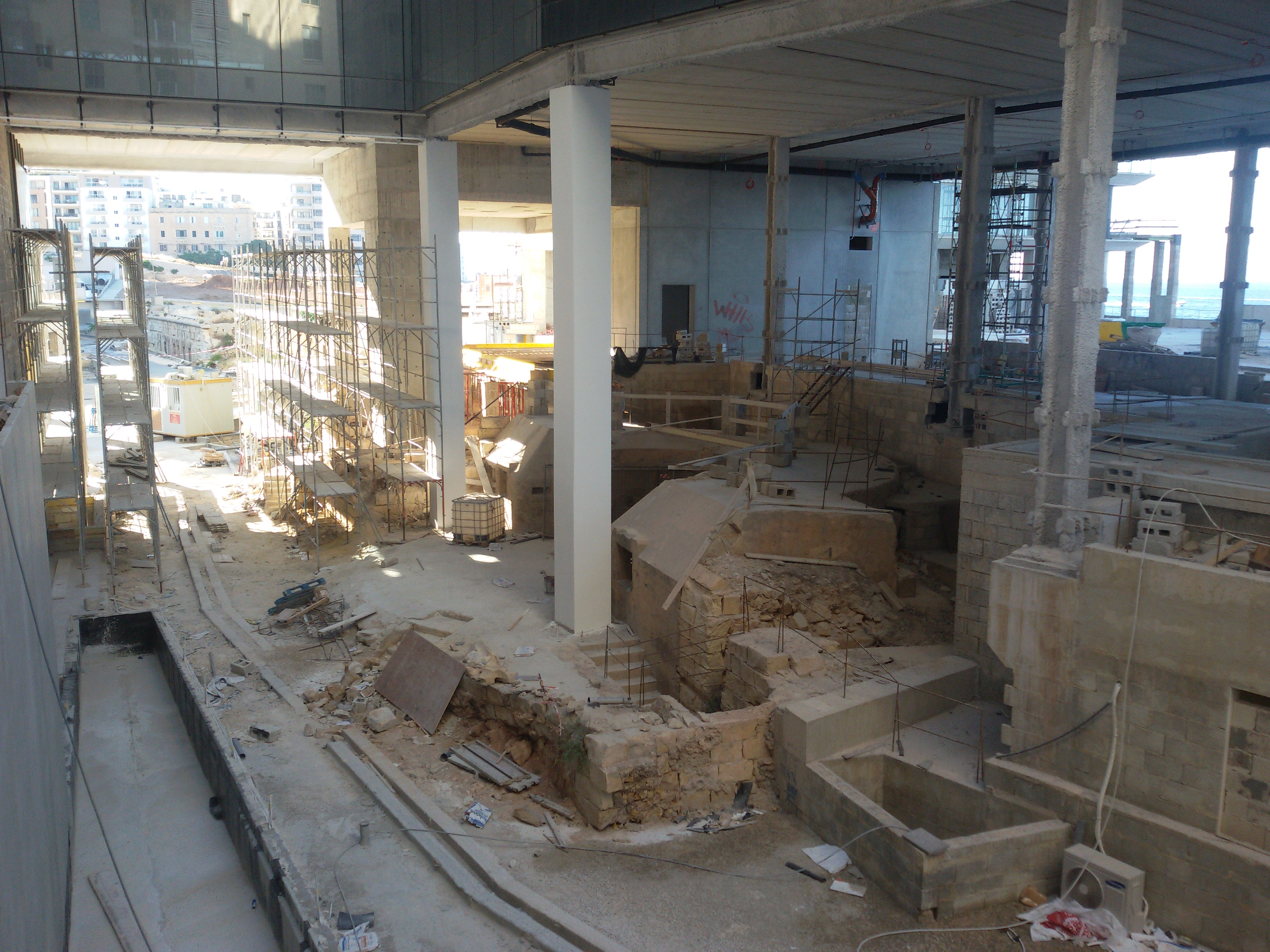
The site of the battery has been built up, but its remains have been preserved under the new development

In the late 1990s, the green light was given to excavate and dismantle the area of battery to build a tunnel as part of the Tigné Point development project. However, in 2000-2001 The Malta Environment and Planning Authority (MEPA) appealed for the preservation of the battery. The developers, MIDI plc, changed the original plans and agreed to preserve and restore the battery.

The area was eventually excavated and the battery was rediscovered in 2005, so the gun emplacements can be seen once again. When development of the area is complete, the battery is to form part of a heritage route.
