= Napier of Magdala Battery =

Artillery battery in Gibraltar

- 100-Ton Gun
- Part of Fortifications of Gibraltar
- Rosia Bay, Gibraltar
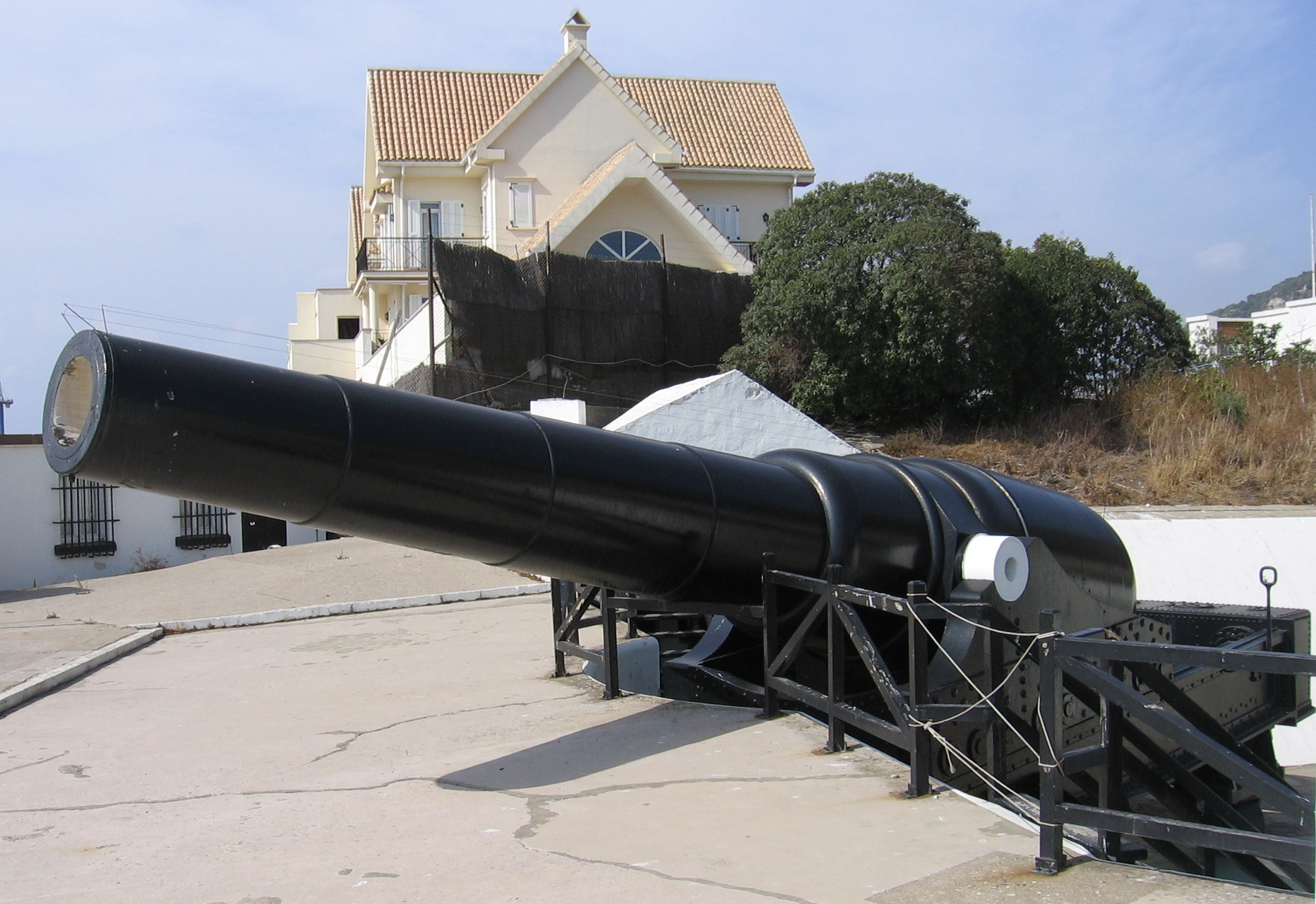
- The 100-ton gun at Napier of Magdala Battery

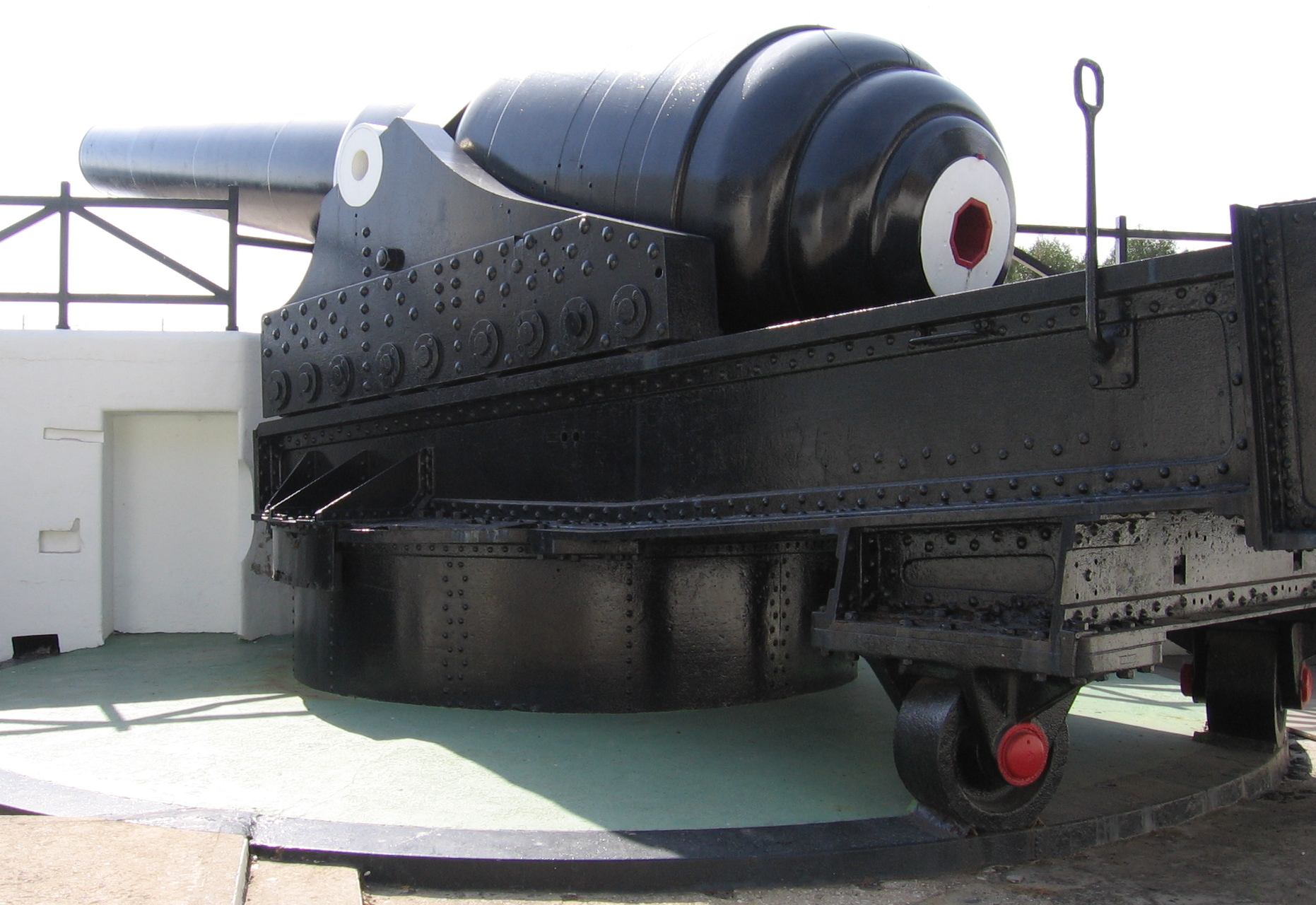
- Rear view of the 100-ton gun

Site information
- Type: Coastal battery
- Owner: Government of Gibraltar
- Controlled by: Gibraltar
- Open to the public: Yes
- Condition: Good

Location
- Location of Napier of Magdala Battery.
- Coordinates: 36.1227°N 5.3541°W

Site history
- Built by: British Government
- Events: Calpe Conference (2002)

Garrison information
- Garrison: Royal Gibraltar Regiment

Napier of Magdala Battery is a former coastal artillery battery on the south-western cliffs of the British Overseas Territory of Gibraltar, overlooking the Bay of Gibraltar. It also overlooks Rosia Bay from the north, as does Parson's Lodge Battery from the south. It contains one of two surviving Armstrong 100-ton guns.

== History ==
In 1883 the British Government installed a single 100-ton gun: a 450 mm rifled muzzle-loading (RML) gun made by Armstrong Whitworth, at the battery by Rosia Bay that they named Napier of Magdala Battery after Field Marshal Robert Napier, 1st Baron Napier of Magdala, who had served as Governor of Gibraltar from 1876 to 1883.

Earlier, in 1879, they had mounted another such gun in Gibraltar at Victoria Battery. These two batteries, together with two in Malta (Cambridge Battery and Fort Rinella), were a response to the Italians having, in 1873, built the battleship Duilio, which was to receive four Armstrong Guns of the same design. The British authorised the construction of Victoria and Napier of Magdala batteries in December 1878; they completed Victoria in 1879 and Napier of Magadala in 1883, at a total cost of £35,707. Because the British viewed the two batteries as part of the one large fortress that was the Rock of Gibraltar, the batteries lacked all-round protection and any of the close-in defences such as the dry moats with caponiers or counterscarp galleries that the British installed at Cambridge Battery and Fort Rinella, both of which were free-standing pentagonal forts.

The gun that is now at Napier of Magdala Battery originally armed Victoria Battery, but the British moved it to Napier when the original gun there split during firing practice. The gun at Napier Battery received the nickname, "The Rockbuster".

During World War II, the British Army stationed a battery of four 3.7" and two Bofors quick-firing anti-aircraft guns at the site. In 1945 they almost fired upon an Iberia Airlines Junkers Ju 88 that had wandered into Gibraltar's airspace while on a flight from Málaga to Tetouan.

The "Rockbuster" was last fired in 2002 (with a very small signaling charge) to mark the 2002 Calpe Conference between Gibraltar and Malta.

== Philately ==
In 2010 Gibraltar and Malta jointly issued a four-stamp set of stamps featuring the two countries' 100-ton guns. Two stamps show the gun at Napier of Magdala Battery, and two the gun at Fort Rinella. One of each pair is a view from 1882, and the other is a view from 2010. The stamps from Gibraltar bear a denomination of 75 pence, while those from Malta bear a denomination of 0.75 euros.

== Gallery ==
Napier of Magdala Battery
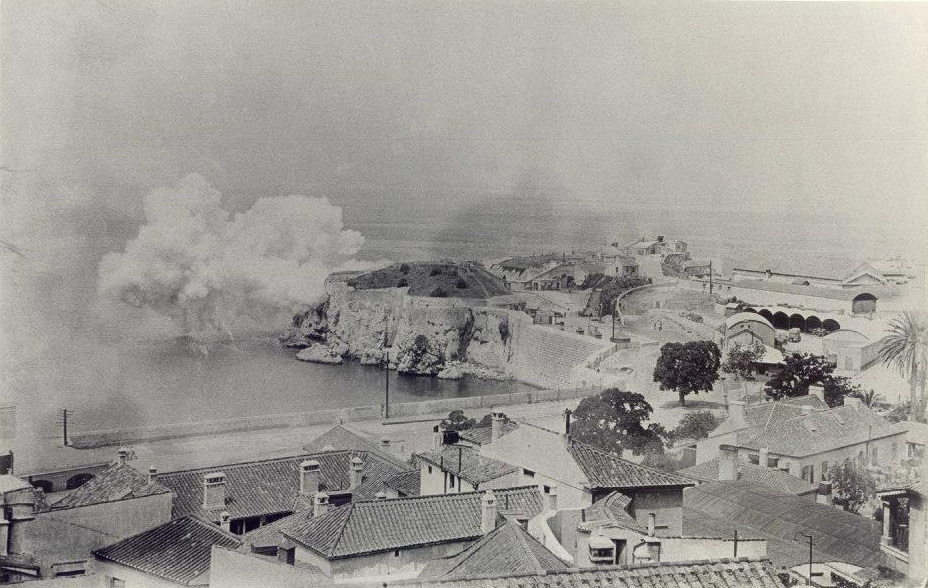
100 ton gun firing from Napier of Magdala Battery in the 1880s

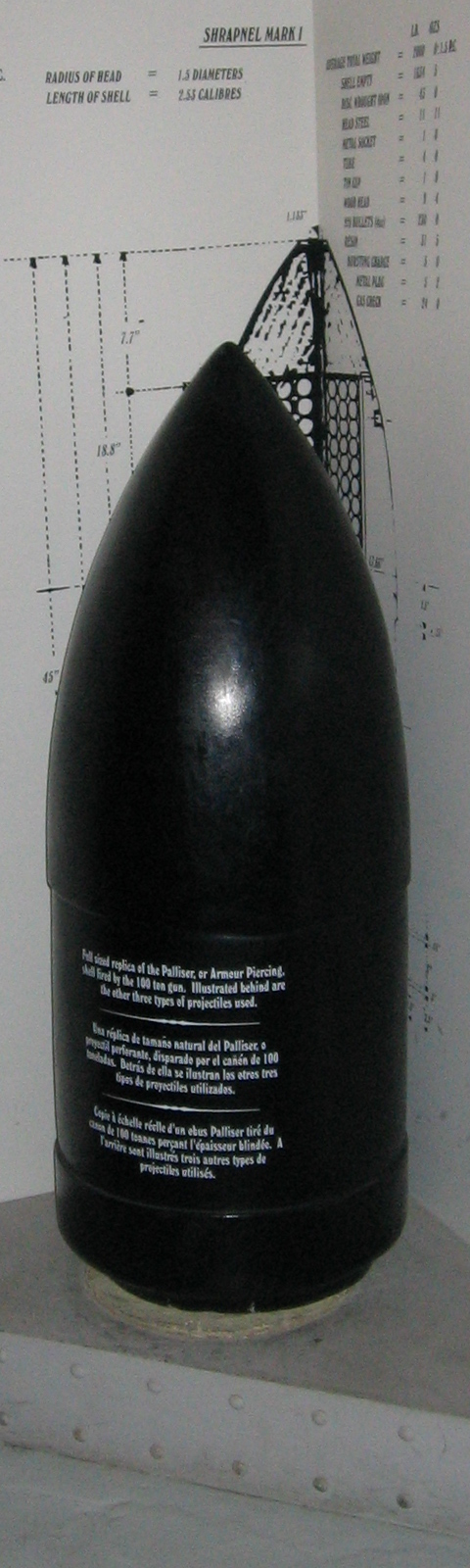
A replica of the 100-ton gun's 17.72 inch projectile
