= Fort Saint Rocco =

Historical fort in Kalkara, Malta

- Forti San Rokku
- Kalkara, Malta
- The fort as seen overhead from a drone, in 2026

Site information
- Type: Polygonal fort
- Open to the public: No
- Condition: Intact

Location
- Coordinates: 35°53′32.97″N 14°32′16.07″E
- Area: 21,200 m^{2} (228,000 sq ft)

Site history
- Built: 1872–1873 (first fort); 1900 (second fort)
- Built by: British Empire
- In use: 1873–1950s
- Materials: Limestone and concrete
- Battles/wars: World War II

Fort Saint Rocco (Maltese: Forti Santu Rokku), also known as Fort Saint Roca on some maps, is a polygonal fort in Kalkara, Malta. It is located east of Rinella Battery and seaward of the village of Santu Rokku, and forms part of the complex of shore batteries built by the British to defend the coast east of the mouth of Grand Harbour between the 1870s and 1900s.

== History ==
=== Military use ===
The construction of Fort Saint Rocco started in 1872 or 1873 by the British, as part of a programme of improvements to Malta's fortifications recommended in Colonel Jervois' Report of 1866.

The fort was built on the site of San Rocco Battery, an artillery battery built by Maltese insurgents during the blockade of 1798–1800.

Fort Saint Rocco was the first polygonal fort built by the British in Malta, and the second one built in Malta overall (the first was Fort Tigné built by the Order of Saint John). The first fort, built between 1872 and 1873, was very small given the importance of the site. It was initially armed with three RML 11 inch 25 ton guns, but these were soon replaced with RML 12.5 inch 38 ton guns.

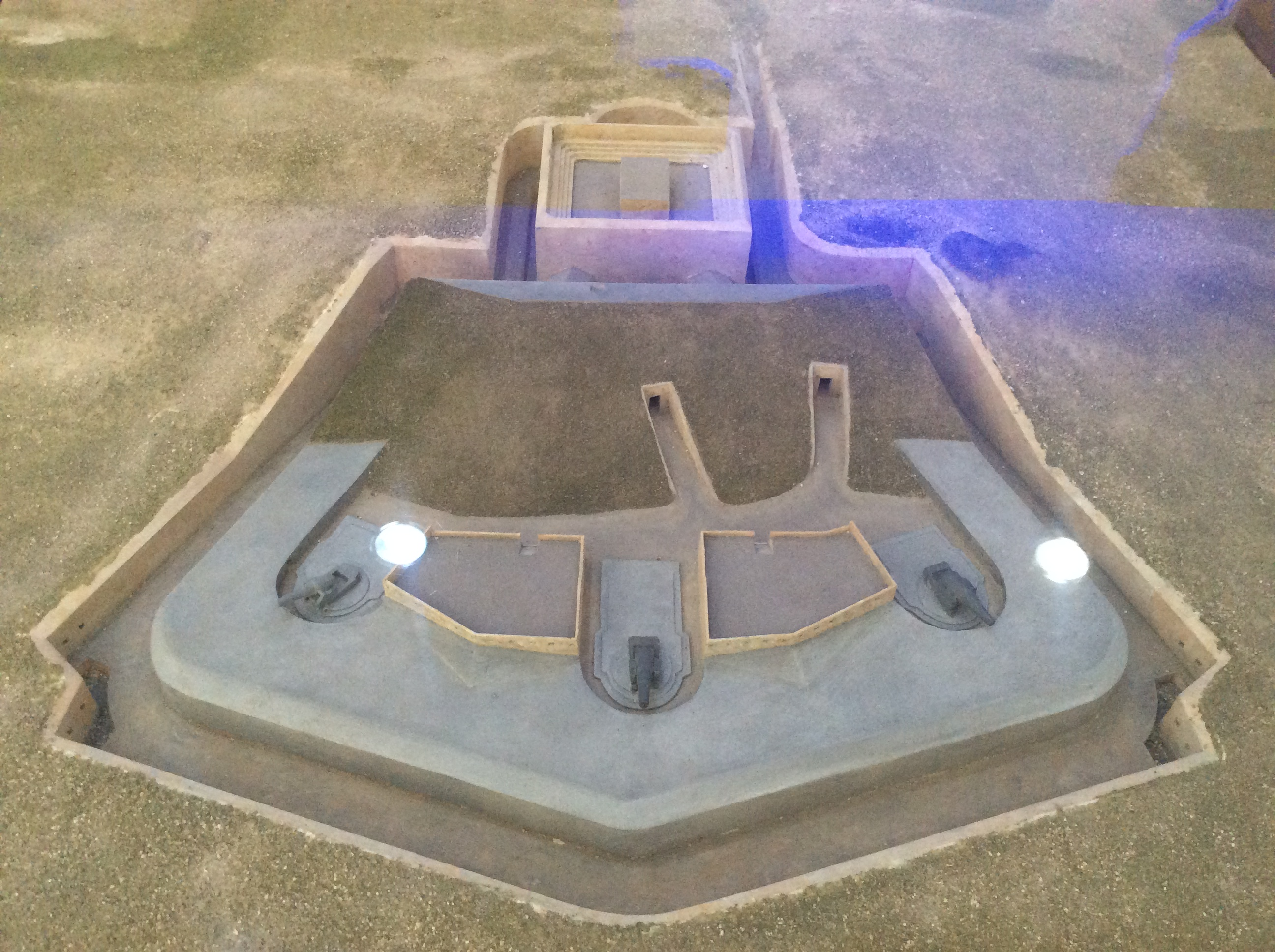
Model of the Fort Saint Rocco as originally built in 1872–73 (prior to the rebuilding of 1900), displayed at the Fortifications Interpretation Centre

In 1888, the fort was inspected and was described as cramped, and some alterations were proposed. Eventually, the keep and most of the battery were demolished, and a much larger fort was built in its place in 1900. The new fort was armed with BL 9.2 inch guns.

On 17 May 1942, the fort fired at attacking Italian E-boats and destroyed one of them. The fort remained a functional military establishment until the 1950s.

=== Present day ===
The fort is located close to SmartCity Malta, a technology park. Care was taken not to damage the fort during the construction of the centre. The public is forbidden from entering the fort. Pierre Farrugia, an explorer of historic Maltese sites, said of the fort in 2022: "[It] sadly fell victim to vandal acts and was left to rot away too."

The fort as seen from outside, in 2026

In May 2015, several NGOs suggested that the campus of the proposed American University of Malta should be split up between Fort Saint Rocco and the nearby Fort Ricasoli and Fort San Salvatore. This proposal was not implemented, and the campus was built between Dock No. 1 in Bormla and Żonqor Point in Marsaskala.

In March 2024, the Planning Authority put forward a complex of sixty-nine villas, situated below the fort and nearby SmartCity, for approval. A plan to build fifty-one villas there had been approved fifteen years earlier. Taking up 24,000 square metres of land and spanning five to ten metres in height, a MaltaToday article judged the villas would "dominate coastal views when seen from Fort Ricasoli, Fort Rinella and Fort St Rocco". A promenade was also to be built by the coastline in front of the villas. Further, a space of 10,000 square metres around the fort was to remain landscaped. But since the amount of space consumed for the villas had increased since the 2009 approval, the Planning Board overturned the recommendation around May 2024.

== Gallery ==
Notable buildings, all pictured in 2026

The abandoned building with the black Coca-Cola logo inscribed on its wall in Fort Saint Rocco, coated with wood on the outside

The building with "Jumanji" inscribed above its entrance

Abandoned barracks

Graffiti, all pictured in 2026

On a building exterior

Inside the "Coca-Cola" building

On a rusted metal structure

Views from inside the premises, all pictured in 2026

Of the fort and beyond, especially urban Kalkara, from the "Jumanji" building

Of Kalkara and the Shoreline mall

Of the fort and beyond, including St. Julian's, from the "Jumanji" building
