= Victoria Battery =

Artillery battery in Gibraltar

- Part of Fortifications of Gibraltar
- Gibraltar
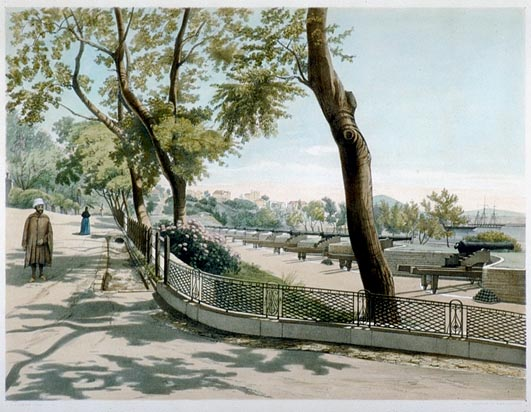
- by Thomas Colman Dibdin

Site information
- Type: Artillery battery
- Owner: Ministry of Defence

Location
- Location in Gibraltar
- Coordinates: 36.132171°N 5.352193°W

Site history
- Built: 1883

Victoria Battery (one of two identically-named batteries named after Queen Victoria) was an artillery battery in the British Overseas Territory of Gibraltar. It was built in the 1840s on top of the earlier Princess of Wales Batteries following a report by Major-General Sir John Thomas Jones on Gibraltar's defences. The battery was located on the west side of Gibraltar and was one of a number of "retired" batteries in the territory, constructed to improve the coastal defences between Europa Point and the town.

The battery was completed by 1843 and was nicknamed "Snake in the Grass Battery" due to its irregular undulating shape, measuring about 200 yards (180 m) long. It mounted fifteen 32-pdr. guns in 1850, seven of which were replaced in 1863 by 68-pdrs. In 1868 Colonel W.F.D. Jervois wrote a report into the defences of Gibraltar which recommended installing larger rifled muzzle loader (RML) guns. Two 9-inch RMLs were installed in the south flank with iron casemates providing protection. This reduced the space available for the other guns to seven emplacements, of which three were occupied by 80-pdr. RMLs by 1888. The 9-inch RMLs were later replaced by 10-inch RMLs but all of the 80-pdrs. were removed in 1892, followed by the 10-inch guns in 1900.

In 1878 a new battery, also called Victoria Battery, was constructed on the right flank of the earlier battery to house a 100 ton gun. It was completed in 1883 but fell into disuse within only five years, by which time the gun was already obsolete.
