= 100-ton gun =

Armstrong 100-ton gun
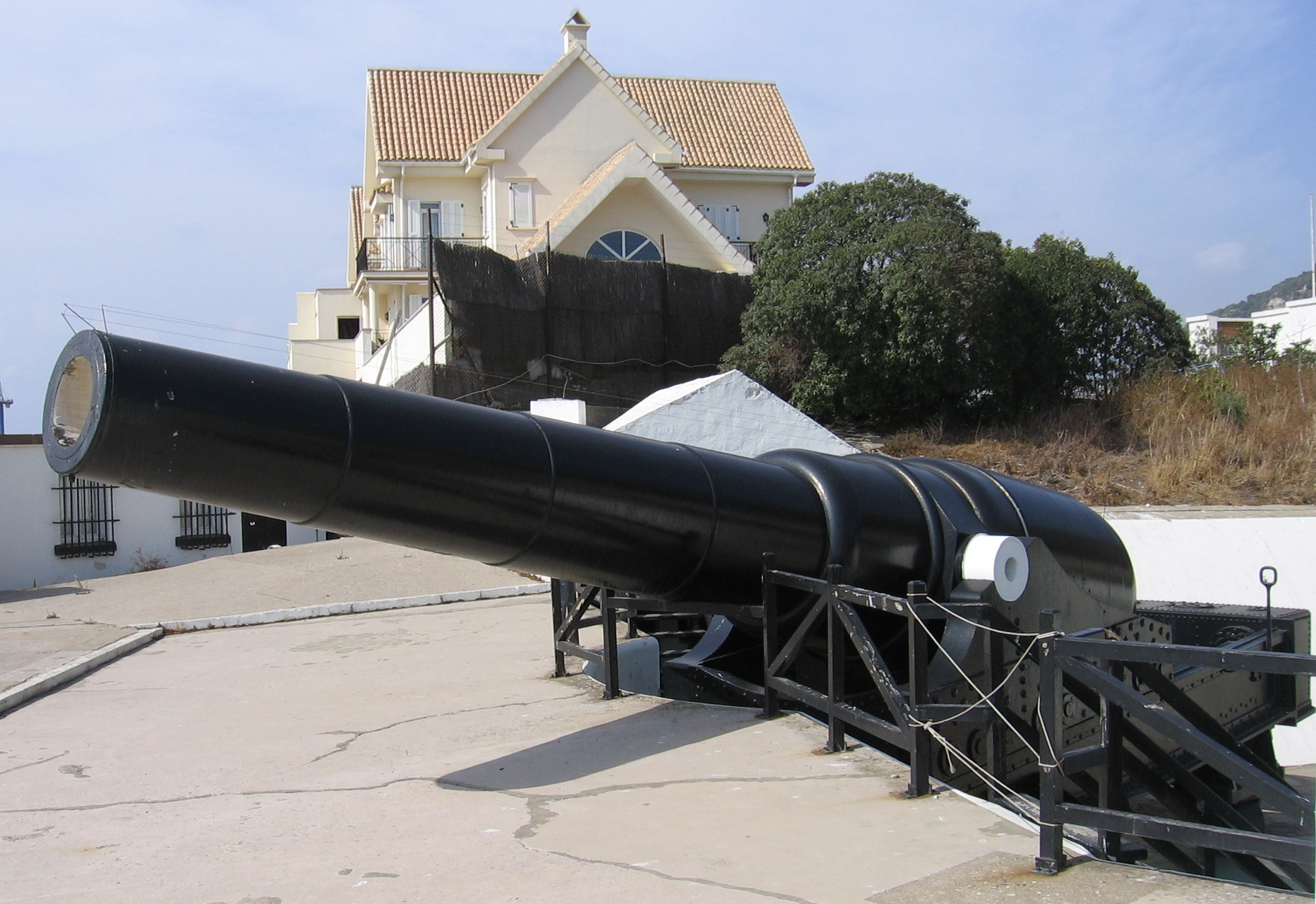
- "Rockbuster" at Napier of Magdala Battery, Gibraltar
- Type: Naval gun Coast defence gun
- Place of origin: United Kingdom

Service history
- In service: 1877-1906
- Used by: Kingdom of Italy; United Kingdom

Production history
- Designer: Elswick Ordnance Company
- Unit cost: £16,000 (approximately £1.64 million in 2025 GBP)
- No. built: 15

Specifications
- Mass: 103 tons
- Barrel length: bore: 363.0 inches (9.22 m) (20.5 calibres)
- Shell: HE, AP, Shrapnel, 2,000 pounds (910 kg)
- Calibre: 450-millimetre (17.72 in)
- Recoil: 1.75 m (5 ft 9 in)
- Elevation: 10° 30'
- Traverse: 150°
- Muzzle velocity: 1,548 feet per second (472 m/s) (Firing a 1,968 lb projectile with 450 lb Prism powder propellant)
- Maximum firing range: 6,600 yards (6,000 m)

The 100-ton gun (also known as the Armstrong 100-ton gun) was a British coastal defense gun and is the world's largest black powder cannon. It is a 17.72-inch (450 mm) rifled muzzle-loading (RML) gun made by Elswick Ordnance Company, the armaments division of the British manufacturing company Armstrong Whitworth, owned by William Armstrong. The 15 guns Armstrong made were used to arm two Italian battleships and, to counter these, British fortifications at Malta and Gibraltar.

== Origins ==
Around 1870, the largest gun made by UK firms was the 320 mm RML (rifled, muzzle-loading) gun, with a mass of 38 long tons (38.6 t), firing an 818-pound (371 kg) projectile capable of piercing 16.3 inches (410 mm) of mild steel at 2,000 yards (1,800 m).,This weapon was adequate for the needs of the time, but the progress of gun technology was very rapid. French industries soon made a 420 mm (17 in), 76 t (75 long tons; 84 short tons) gun. This led the Royal Navy to ask for an 81 t (80 long tons; 89 short tons) gun.

Armstrong, the main British artillery producer, began a project for creation of an even larger weapon, an 18 in (460 mm) gun, also called the '100 ton'. Armstrong offered it to the Royal Navy, which rejected the gun, deeming it too heavy and costly.

== Description ==
=== General characteristics ===
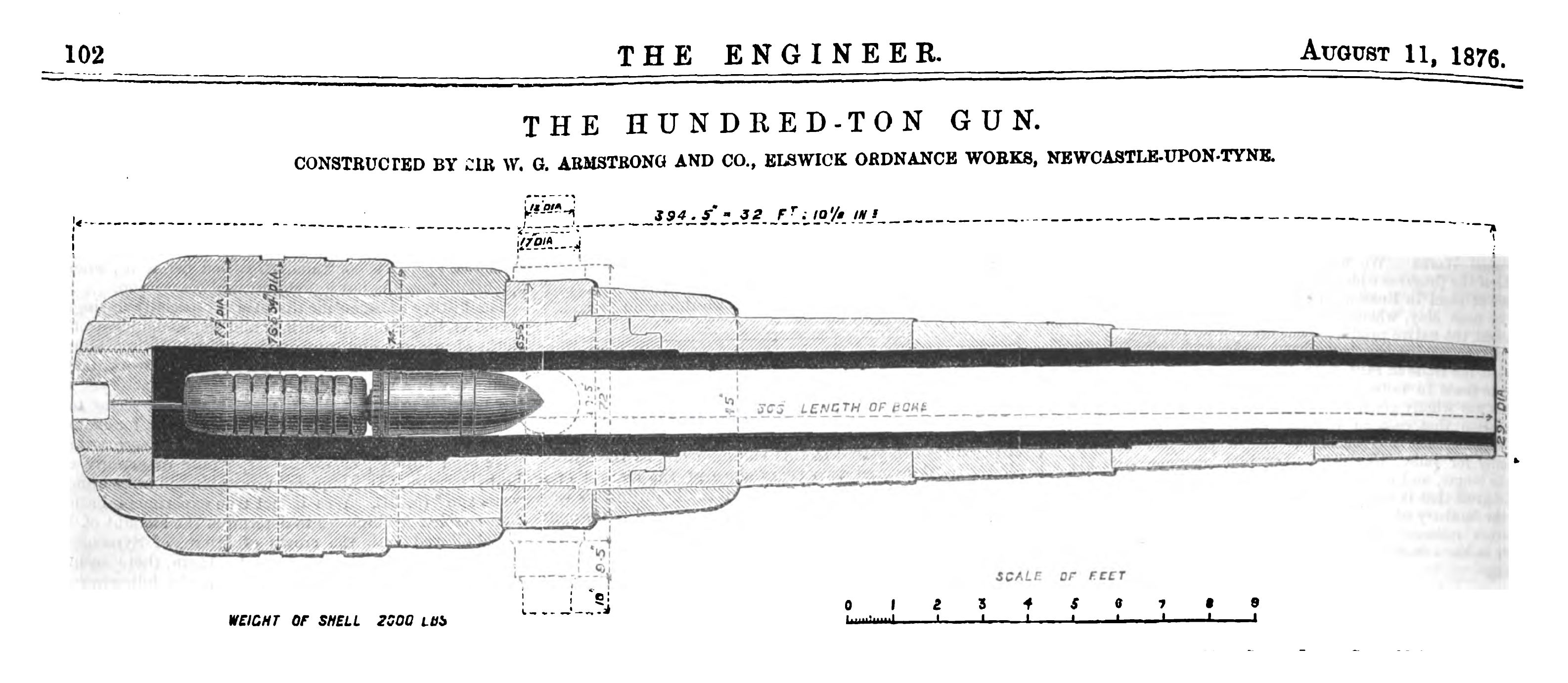
Unchambered 17-inch gun

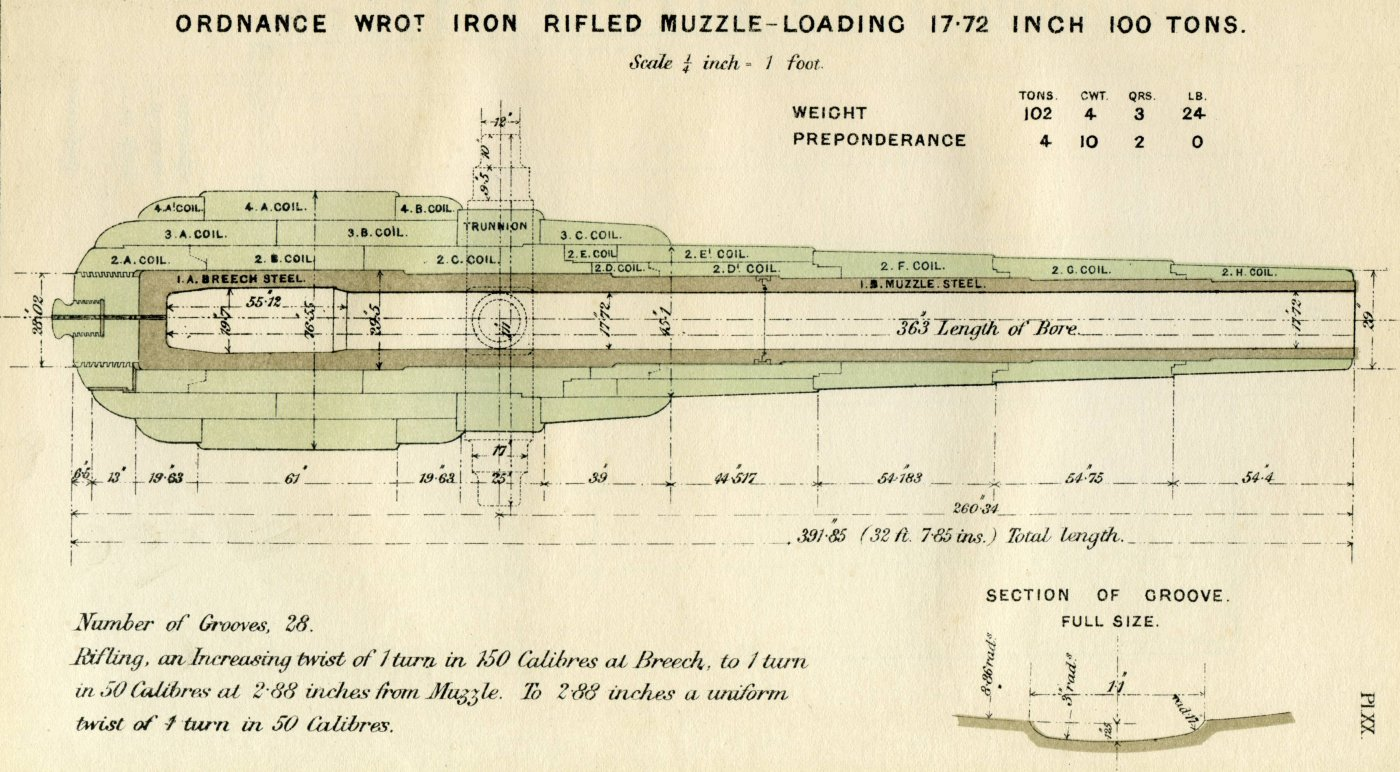
Chambered 17.72-inch gun

The 100 ton gun was enormous for its time. The weight was comparable to that of the much later Iowa-class 406 mm (16.0 in)/50cal guns, even though their barrels were quite short. They were muzzle-loading guns, with a rifled tube and rigid mount. Each gun required a crew of 35 men, including 18 men to handle the ammunition.

=== First build ===
The 100-ton gun was first built with a caliber of 17 in (430 mm) throughout the whole length of its bore. It was 32 ft 10.5 in (10.020 m) (L/23.5) long. The barrel's outer diameter was 77 in (2.0 m) at the breech, which reduced to 29 in (740 mm) at the muzzle. The length of bore was 30 feet 6 inches (9.30 m) long, or 21.5 calibers. The rifling consisted of 27 grooves of 1/8-inch depth and had a progressive twist rate of L/45 at the muzzle. The driving bands of the shells were attached gas-checks instead of the traditional studs. The weight of the gun was 101.5 LT (103.1 t), or about 100 tons.

The gun was built up from an inner steel tube surrounded by multiple wrought iron coils. The inner tube itself consisted of two parts joined by a double ring. This was caused by the manufacturer being unable to make this in one piece.

The loading gear of the gun was hydraulic. In a fixed position, the barrel was declined to bring in the charge and a ram head then forced the shot up the bore to its seat against the charge. After firing, the gun was again brought back to this position. The ram, which had a sponge head, would then be brought in again. When it reached the back of the gun it would unleash a powerful jet of water to clean the barrel and make sure no fire was left. Once the ram had been withdrawn, a new charge and shot were brought up in turn and positioned before the barrel. The whole operation was handled by a man pulling levers.

Firing was mechanical or electrical, with an optical system for aiming.

The gun crews could fire a projectile once every six minutes. Muzzle velocity was 472 m/s (1,550 ft/s) and maximum elevation was 10° 30'. At maximum charge 204 kg (450 lb)?) and maximum elevation, a projectile could achieve a range of only 5,990 m (19,650 ft), but at that distance the projectile could still pierce 394 mm (15.5 in) of steel (it is not clear if it was mild or hardened).

The weight of the mount was: 20,680 kg (45,590 lb) (mobile mounts with 18 wheels), 24,118 kg (53,171 lb) (platform) and 2,032 kg (4,480 lb) (base). The platform was sloped at 4 degrees to slow the recoil. On the platform mount, hydraulic systems powered chains that traversed the guns through an arc of 150 degrees; another hydraulic system provided elevation.

=== Re-chambering ===
After tests in Italy, the first gun was returned to the factory to get a caliber of 17.75 in (451 mm) and a powder chamber with a diameter of 19.75 in (502 mm). Chambering was a recent innovation and gave this gun an about 35% larger charge chamber. In theory, a larger chamber allowed a higher charge without raising peak pressures. However, as boring up the chamber reduced the gun's strength, the gun was strengthened near the front of the chamber. This was done while retaining the same weight. Another innovation was the use of shallower polygonal rifling. All other guns were directly built to incorporate these changes.

== Ammunition ==
This was a second-generation RML gun, equipped with polygroove rifling and firing only studless ammunition with automatic gas-checks for rotation.

Projectiles were of three types, all weighing 2,000 pounds (910 kg) and having a diameter of 17.7 inches (450) mm:

- Armour-piercing (AP) Palliser, 44 inches (1.12 m) long, steel forward section, capable of piercing 21 in (0.53 m) of steel at 2,000 yd (530 mm at 1,800 m). with a 32-pound (14.5 kg) explosive internal charge.
- High explosive (HE) Common, 48 1/2 inches (1.23 m) long, with thinner walls and a 78-pound (35 kg) HE charge.
- Shrapnel shell: 45 inches (1.1 m) long, with a charge of only 5 pounds (2.3 kg) HE, but also 920 bullets of 4 ounces (110 g) each.

Firing charges were polygonal in shape, with 399 x 368 mm maximum width and length. They were made of 1 cwt (51 kg (112 lb)) 'Large Black Prism' propellant, and four or five were needed for every shell fired at maximum power. The recoil was 1.75 m (5 ft 9 in) as two hydraulic pistons in the rear part of platform absorbed the remaining energy.

== Italian service ==
=== The Italian order ===
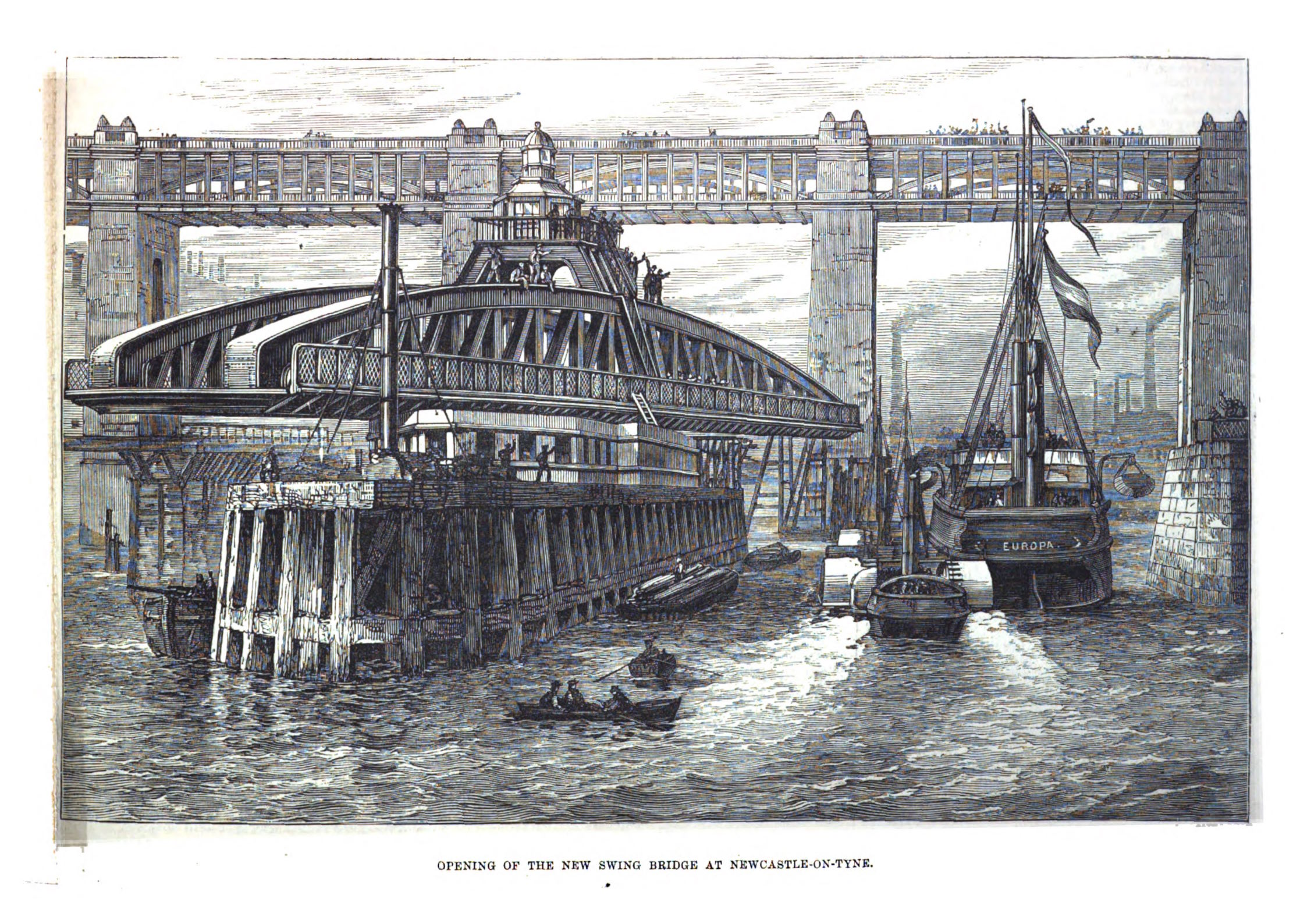
S.S. Europa comes to collect the first gun

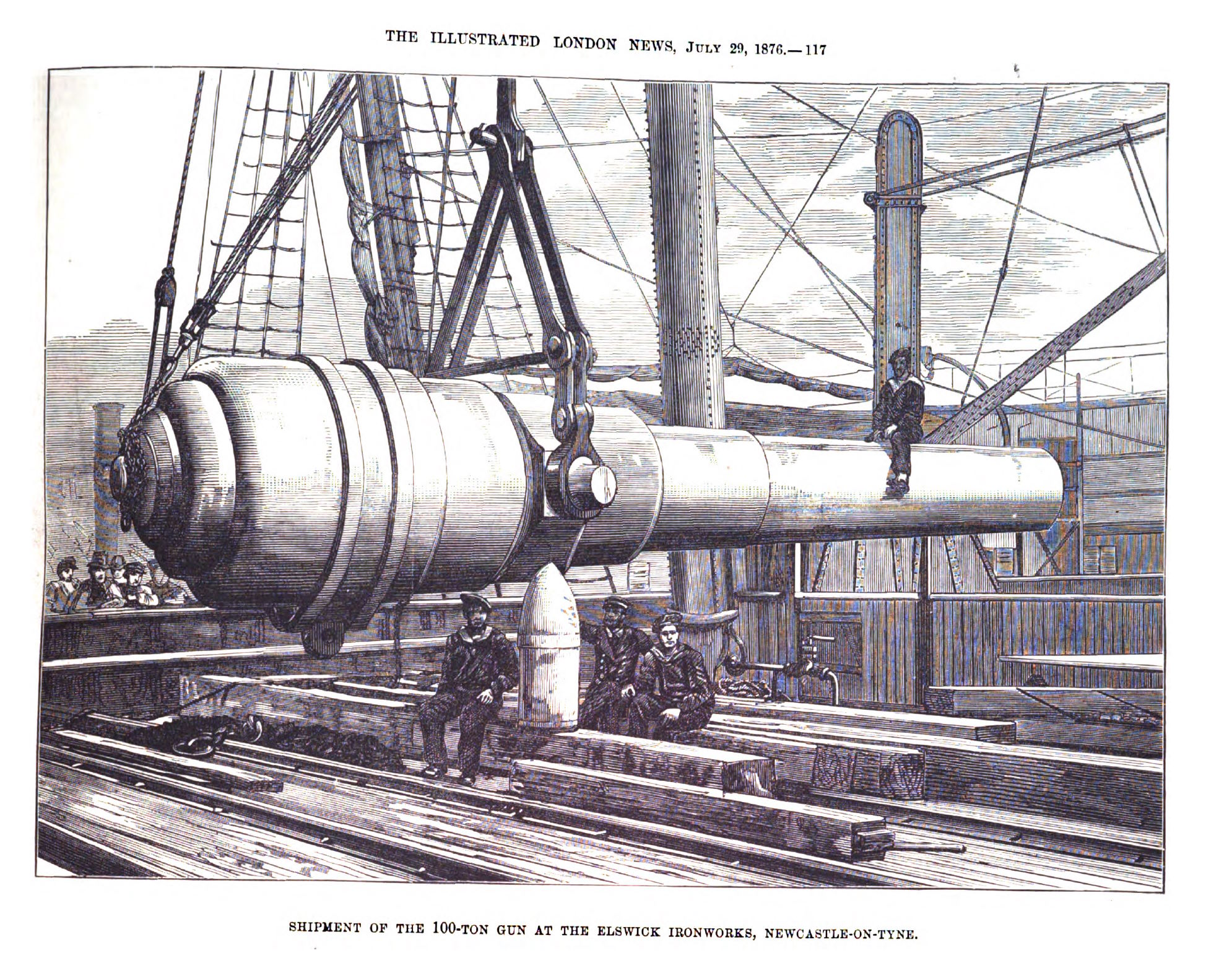
The first gun is embarked.

After the reunification of Italy, the Regia Marina began an innovative program to field the best and most powerful battleships of the time, the first being the Duilio-class, armed with 380 mm guns. They were already very powerful, but in February 1874 when the UK started to build HMS Inflexible, armed with 406 mm (16.0 in) guns, Italian admirals called for even more powerful guns, to hold the lead in battleship design.

On 21 July 1874, Armstrong signed a contract with Italy to deliver eight of its 100-ton guns, enough to arm Duilio and her sister-ship Dandolo.

=== Transport ===
The order of the 100-ton gun is closely linked to the construction of the Swing Bridge over the River Tyne in Newcastle upon Tyne. This hydraulic swing bridge was also built by Armstrong and at the time, it was the largest of the world. On 17 July 1876, it was opened by the Italian Navy steamer Europa, which came to collect the first 100-ton gun.

In La Spezia, a special 160t crane had been built at the arsenal to handle the 100-ton gun. This was a steam driven hydraulic crane designed by George Wightwick Rendel, the first of Italy.

=== Tests at La Spezia ===
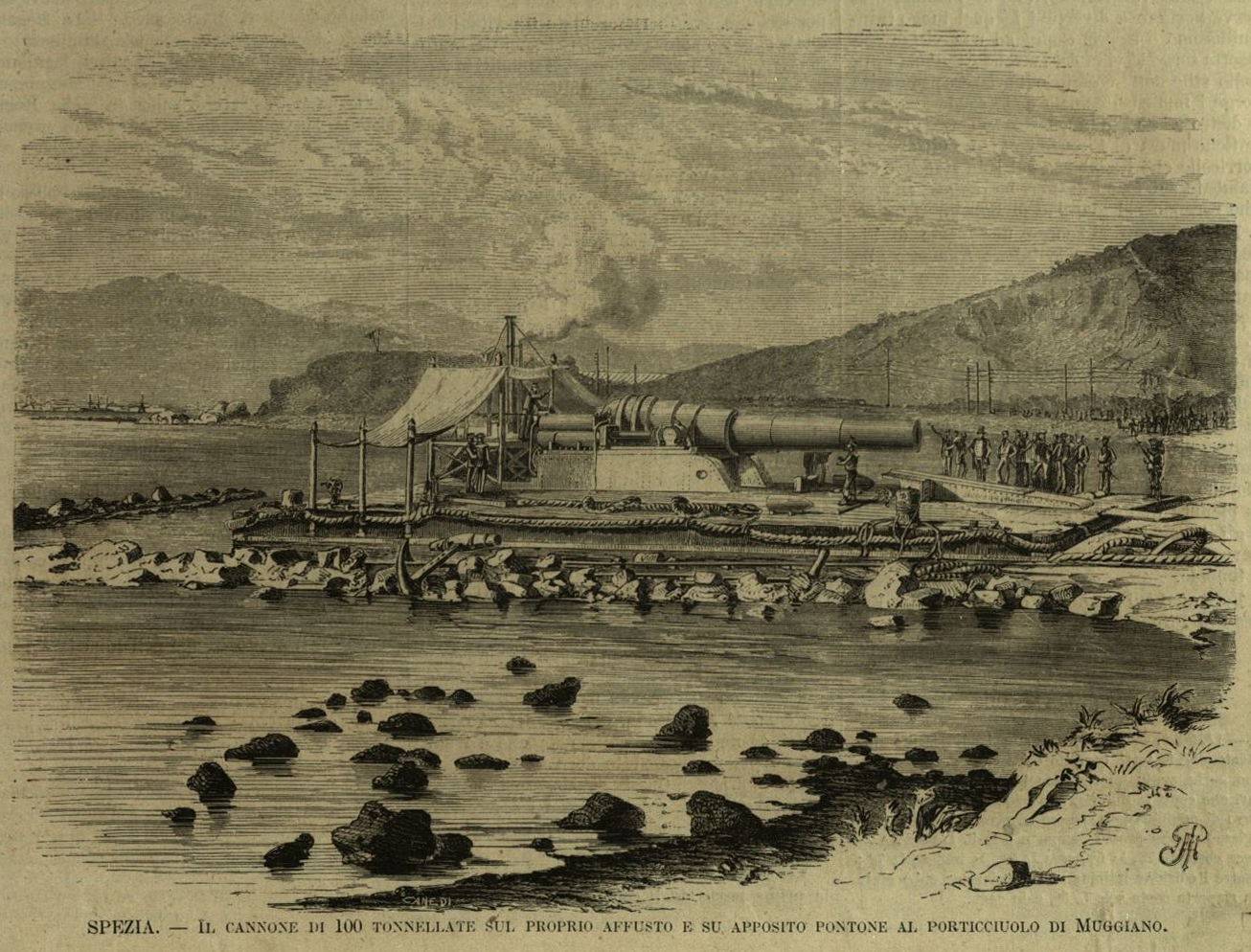
On a pontoon near La Spezia

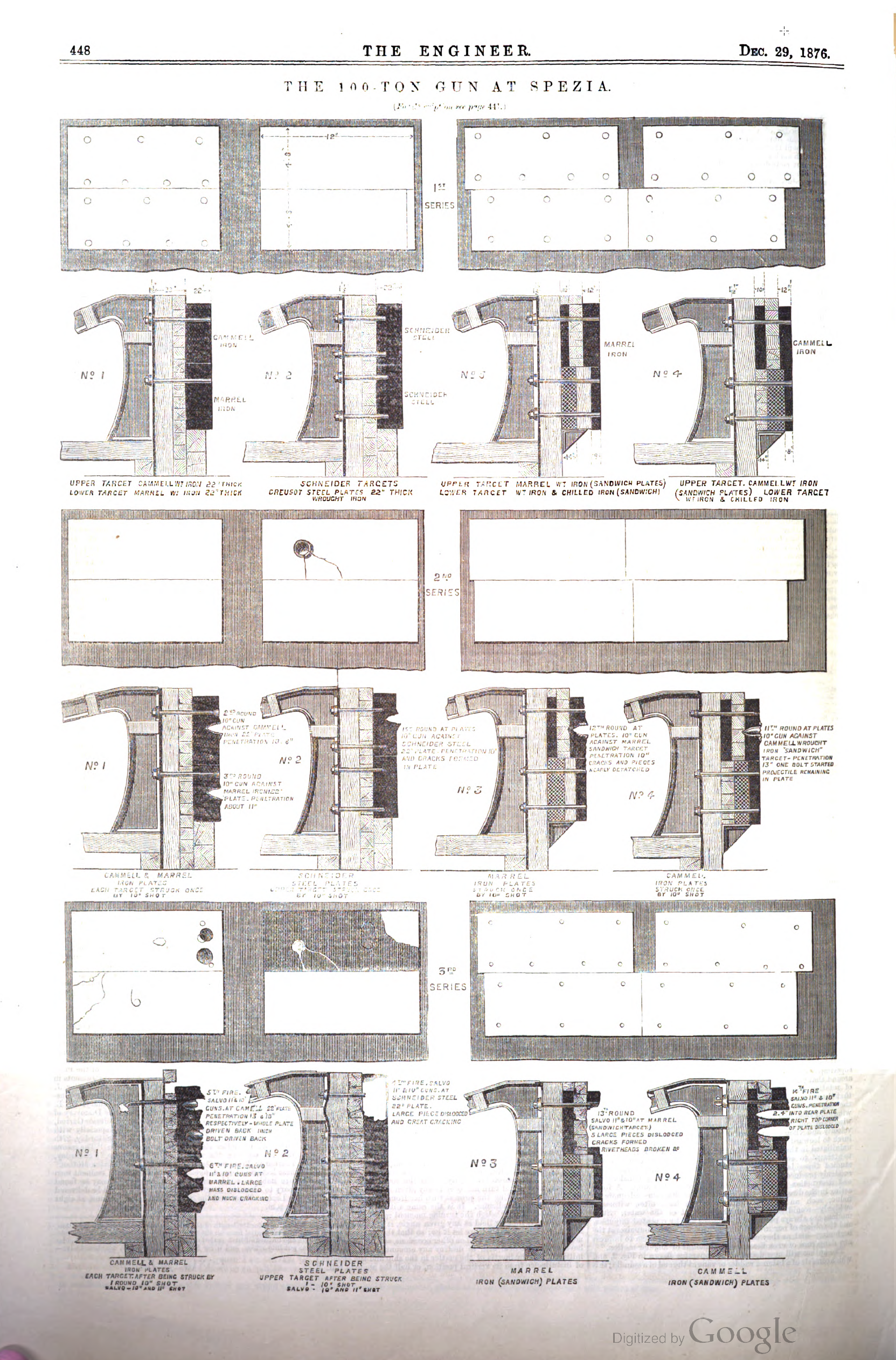
The 1876 armored targets

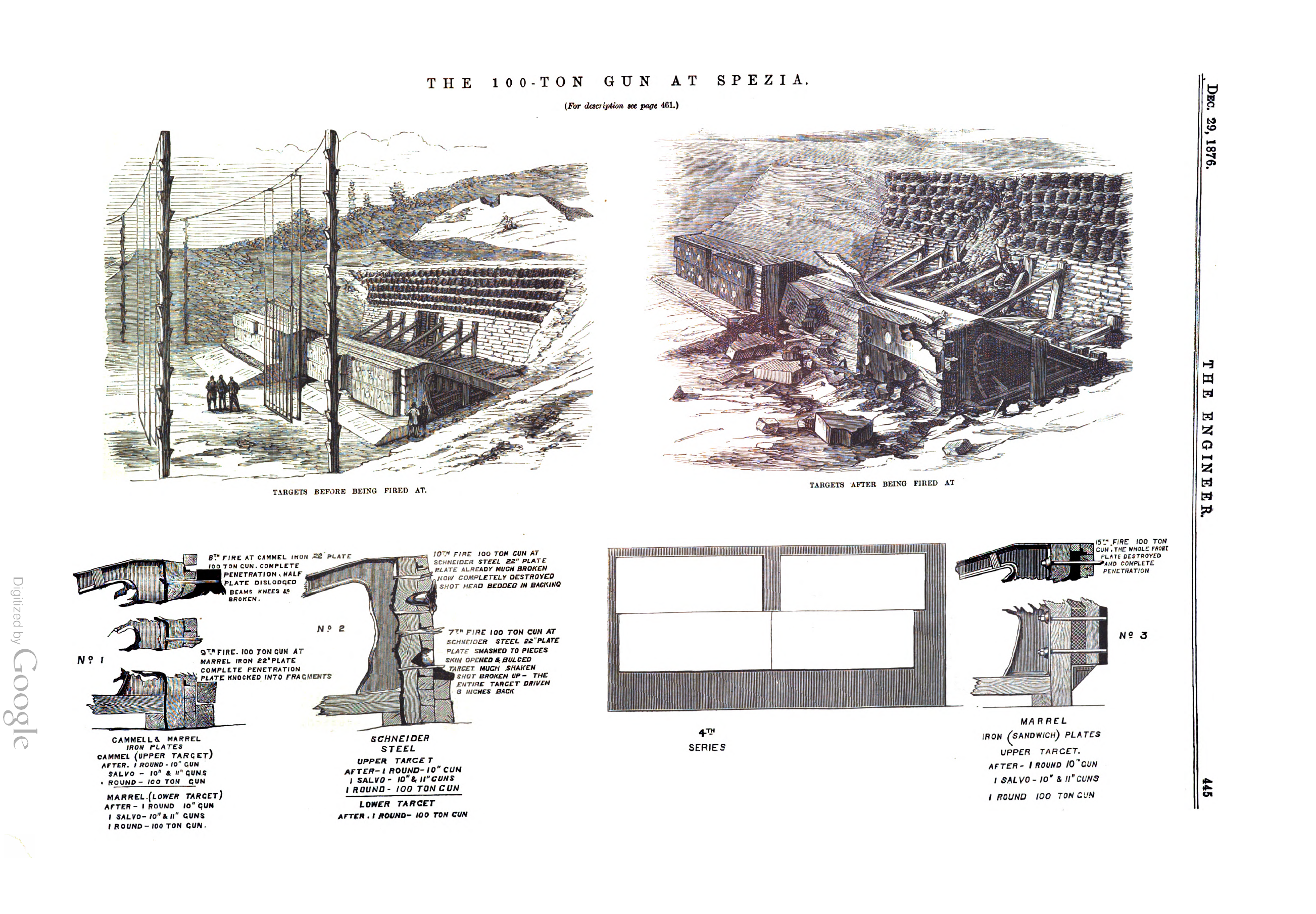
The Spezia targets after firing the 100-ton gun

The Italian Navy tested the 100-ton gun at Muggiano near La Spezia. Here the 100-ton gun was mounted on a 26 by 16 m iron pontoon which stuck out 1 m above the waterline. The pontoon was docked in a basin close to shore. Elevation and declination of the gun was done by hydraulics, powered by a steam engine. The pontoon allowed the gun to turn in the absence of a turret.

The setup with the pontoon was inspected by George Rendel and Captain Noble, partners in the Armstrong firm. Noble was also a known expert on gas pressures in cannon. Some other British visitors were Col. Younghusband of the Woolwich arsenal and Col. Brakenbury of the London Times.

Some preliminary shot were fired on 20, 22, and 23 October 1876. On the third day, velocity measurements finally worked. With a charge of 330 pounds (150 kg), a shot of 2,000 pounds (910 kg) got a velocity of 1,446 feet per second (441 m/s).

The tests against armor targets drew international attention. The targets were indeed mock-ups of ship hulls placed on embankments in a ravine. The first target had two 11 feet 11 inches (3.63 m) long and 4 feet 8 inches (1.42 m) wide Creusot steel plates, placed one above the other. Each was 22 inches (56 cm) thick and backed by two layers of teak collectively 29 inches (74 cm) thick. Behind that was an 1.5 inches (3.8 cm) iron skin and behind that, frames, representing those of a ship. These steel plates were reported to be of very soft steel, meaning that its ductility was supposed to keep it from fracturing.

The second target was similar in every respect. Above, it had a wrought iron front plate by Cammell of Sheffield, below that was a wrought iron plate by Marrell. The third target was of the same dimensions. However, the upper half was made up of two Cammell wrought iron plates of 12 and 10-inch, with 14-inch of timber in between. The lower half contained a 14-inch chilled cast iron plate in the back and an 8-inch wrought iron plate in front. The fourth target was like the third, but with plates made by Marrell and timber in between the wrought and chilled iron plates. The total thickness of all four targets was the same at 4 feet 4 inches (1.32 m).

The raft with the 100-ton gun was about 110 m from the targets. Other guns that participated in the test were a RML 11-inch 23-ton gun and two RML 10-inch 18-ton gun. As these were about 80 m from the target, the range of the guns was almost the same. The smaller guns were placed so that they could be moved sideways to allow the big gun to fire.

On 25 October, the 10-inch gun fired at the upper half of the steel target. The shot penetrated only 10 inches (25 cm) into the first plate, but a few seconds later the plate 'began to sing' and cracks began to extend from the hole. The Cammell and Marrell wrought iron plates resisted the 10-inch gun. Later, the 10 and 11-inch guns defeated the steel target. The day ended with the 100-ton gun firing towards the sea. On the 26th, it fired against the untouched Creusot plate and completely destroyed it. However, the shot broke up and did not get through the target.

While experts concluded that steel was unsuitable for armor, they were puzzled by the cracks from the lighter shot. During the next days, the 100-ton gun fired at the iron targets. These plates were not reduced to pieces. However, the projectiles went straight through with a remaining velocity of about 600 feet per second (180 m/s) and made a very large rent in the iron plates. It meant that the iron vs. steel discussion was again open. In mid-November 1876, Nathaniel Barnsby, Director of Naval Construction to the Royal Navy was to go to La Spezia to study the results and the merits of using steel.

A detailed overview with illustrations of these tests was published. The 100-ton gun fired 39 shot from 20 October to 8 November 1876. The gunpowder used for most shot was the English government Waltham Abbey gunpowder of 1.5 inch cube, although some shots were done with less offensive Fossano gunpowder. The highest observed pressure was 20.8 ton per square inch or 3,170 atm with a charge of 330 pounds (150 kg) and a velocity of 443 m/s.

Pressures were quite irregular, with some higher charges yielding lower peak pressures. Overall, this led the representatives of Armstrong to propose a maximum charge of 145 kg or 300 lb. This gave a velocity of 434 m/s, which was well above the contracted velocity of 423 m/s with a pressure of 2,800 atm.

=== Test of the chambered gun ===
After the first chambered guns had been made, one of these was tested in La Spezia in March and April 1878. This time 85 shot would be fired. There were three goals: First to collect ballistic data while firing with the British powder, and compare this with the data of the original gun; Secondly to test the Italian Fossano gunpowder and compare it with the English P2 powder; Thirdly, to determine the best form of cartridge and the best means to ignite it.

With the proper charges and a projectile of 2,000 pounds (910 kg), the original gun had given a velocity of 1,424 feet per second (434 m/s) at a pressure of 18.3 tons per square inch. For the chambered gun, this was 1,585 feet per second (483 m/s) at a pressure of 17 tons per square inch. This meant that chambering had increased the energy of the gun by about 25%.

The Fossano gunpowder also seemed very effective. Three rounds were fired with an average charge of 433.4 pounds (196.6 kg) of English powder and 492.2 pounds (223.3 kg) of Fossano powder. On average, the Fossano gunpowder increased the energy of the gun by about three percent while it reduced pressure by about 4 tons per square inch. While the English gunpowder was best ignited in the center, the Fossano powder did not seem to suffer from ignition at the end of the charge.

=== Accident ===
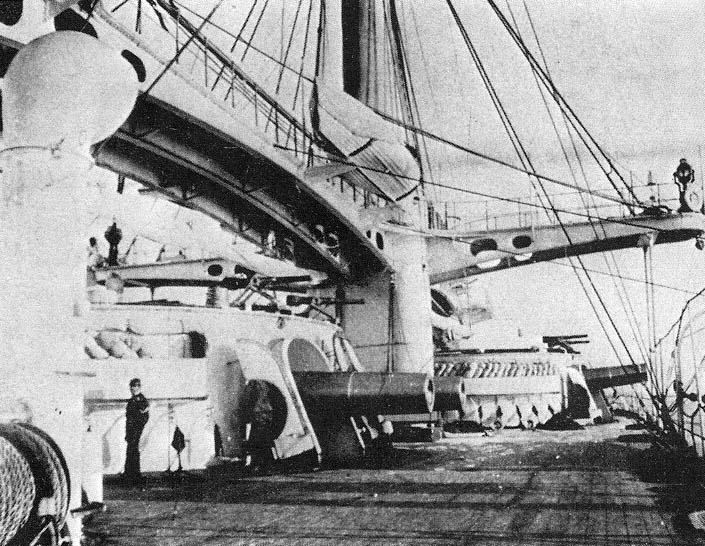
Twin guns on Duilio

During firing trials on 5 March 1880, one of Duilio's guns cracked while firing at the maximum charge. At the suggestion of the British Army, it was officially established that the maximum practical charge was 204 kg (450 lb) and not 255 kg (562 lb).

== British Service ==
=== British response ===
The Italian contract shocked British authorities, who had the Malta naval base to defend. The opening of the Suez Canal in 1869 had rendered Malta the most important British base in the Mediterranean. Although Malta's defenses included 320 mm (13 in) guns, this left Malta poorly defended against a possible attack from Duilio-class ships. This was a worrying problem because Francesco Crispi, one of the key architects of the Italian reunification, had called Malta "Italia irredenta" ("Unredeemed Italy").

The British feared that Duilio and Dandolo, which were already well-armored, could fire on Malta's shore batteries, destroying them one after the other, while keeping outside the effective range of the batteries' guns. But the British Army's concerns had no immediate effect on London bureaucracy; until the Italians launched Duilio in May 1876, London made no decision. The Royal Navy finally responded, requesting proposals from British arms manufacturers for a gun capable of piercing 36-inch steel at 1000 yd (900 mm at 900 m). The manufacturers returned with designs for immense guns of 163, 193, and 224 tons.

In December 1877, Simmons, chief of Malta defenses, was called to London to discuss the issue. He asked for four guns comparable to Duilio's at 3,000 yd (2,700 m). Due to the emergency, it was decided that the fastest and simplest solution was to quit designing the bigger guns and to buy the same weapons as those on Duilio, because generally a shore battery with the same caliber guns as a vessel retains an advantage over the vessel. Four guns were requested in March 1878, and manufacture started in August; in the meantime Duilio had been conducting sea trials since 1877.

When Gibraltar's commanders heard of these big guns they too asked for some, which they obtained. Two of the four guns ordered for Malta would go to Gibraltar instead.

==== Malta service ====
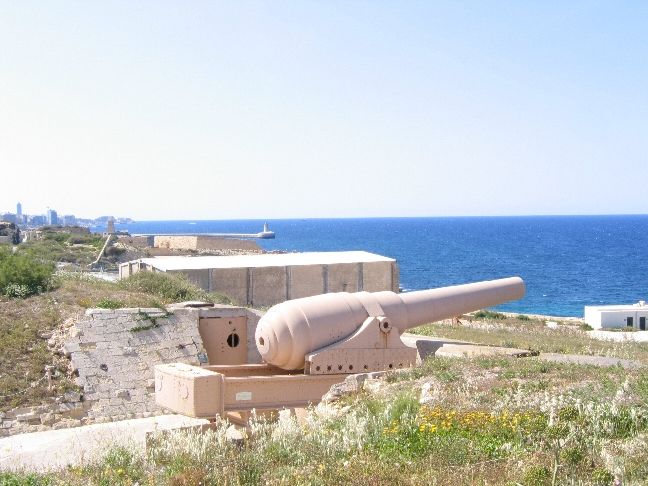
Rinella gun, Malta, still on the original mount

HMS Stanley, a cargo vessel specially adapted for the task, delivered Malta's two guns. One gun was placed in Cambridge Battery, which was ready in 1886, and the other in Rinella Battery, which was completed in 1884. Cambridge received its gun on 16 September 1882, but only mounted it on 20 February 1884. Rinella received its on 31 July 1883, and mounted it on 12 January 1884. By this time, the Duilio-class ships had been operational for around seven years.

The work to make these machines serviceable was so great that until 1885 there were no firing tests. The first ammunition load comprised all the models available, including 50 AP and 50 HE shells. Shrapnel, once fired, was not replaced, being considered less effective. Between 1887 and 1888, activity stopped due to the need to rework hydraulic systems, but nevertheless the guns were considered quite reliable, serving for more than 20 years.

The careers of the guns were unspectacular, as no Italian battleship threatened Malta after their installation. The Malta guns were phased out in 1906, as was the remaining gun at Gibraltar. All had fired their last shots a few years before in 1903 or 1904.

During the First World War the guns at Malta were supposedly made ready for use when SMS Goeben was known to be nearby. Although the 100 t (98 long tons; 110 short tons) guns were powerful, modern weapons would have totally outclassed them: the range and rate of fire of the Maltese guns were too low, as modern 280–305 mm (11.0–12.0 in) guns had a range of over 15–20 km (9.3–12.4 mi) and a rate of fire of one shot every 30 seconds. Goeben would have had no difficulty engaging Malta's guns.

==== Gibraltar service ====
The first battery built for the guns in Gibraltar was Napier of Magdala, on Rosia Bay, and the second, called Victoria Battery, was placed one kilometre north. Construction started in December 1878, with the first ready in 1883 and the second in 1884.

HMS Stanley also delivered Gibraltar's two guns. The first gun arrived on 19 December 1882, and the second on 14 March 1883. These two guns were ready on their mounts in July and September 1883.

The first firings took place in 1884, but the weapons were not fully operational until 1889, due to hydraulic system problems. The barrel on the gun at Napier cracked during firing trials; this was because the crew had managed to stress the gun by firing one shot every 2.5 minutes. The wrecked gun was not easily repairable so it was used as a foundation for a building. The gun at Victoria Battery was moved to Napier, which the military deemed the more effective site.

=== The two surviving guns ===
The guns at Napier of Magdala Battery and at Fort Rinella are still intact and the installations are open to the public. The guns were too costly to demolish and were left as junk, but both were later restored to display condition. Fort Rinella is under the guardianship of Fondazzjoni Wirt Artna - the Malta Heritage Trust. The pink paint on the Fort Rinella gun is a recent addition, originally they were unpainted.

== Gallery ==
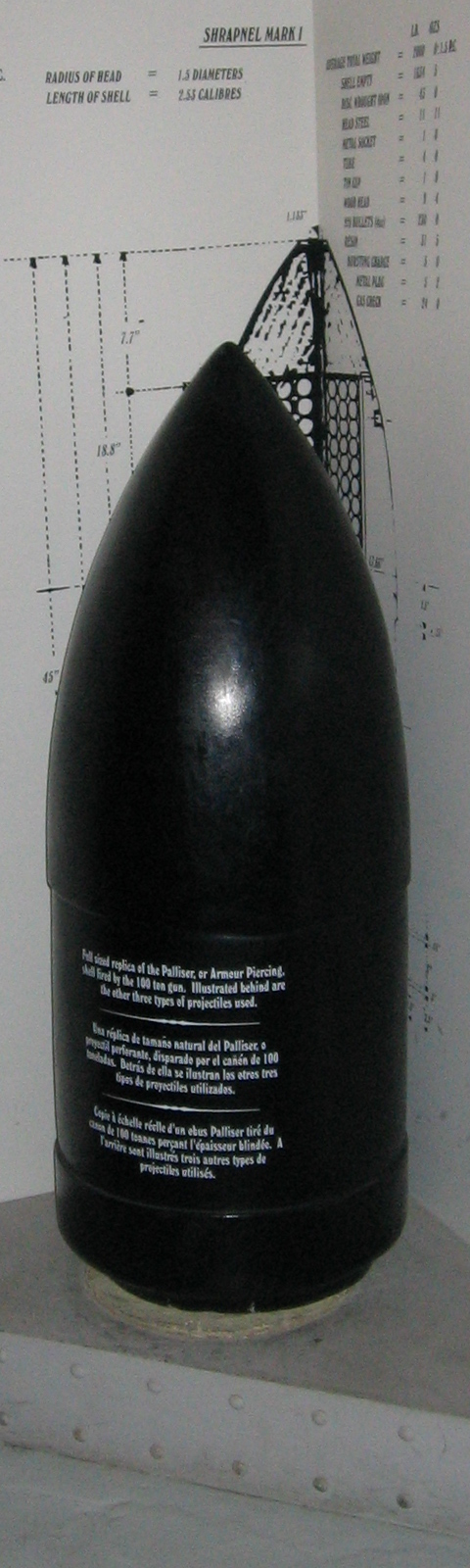
17.72 in (45.0 cm) projectile

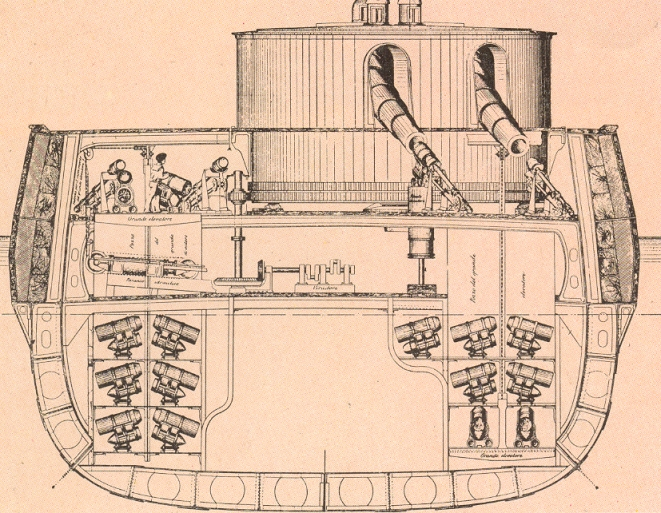
Twin turret, Duilio

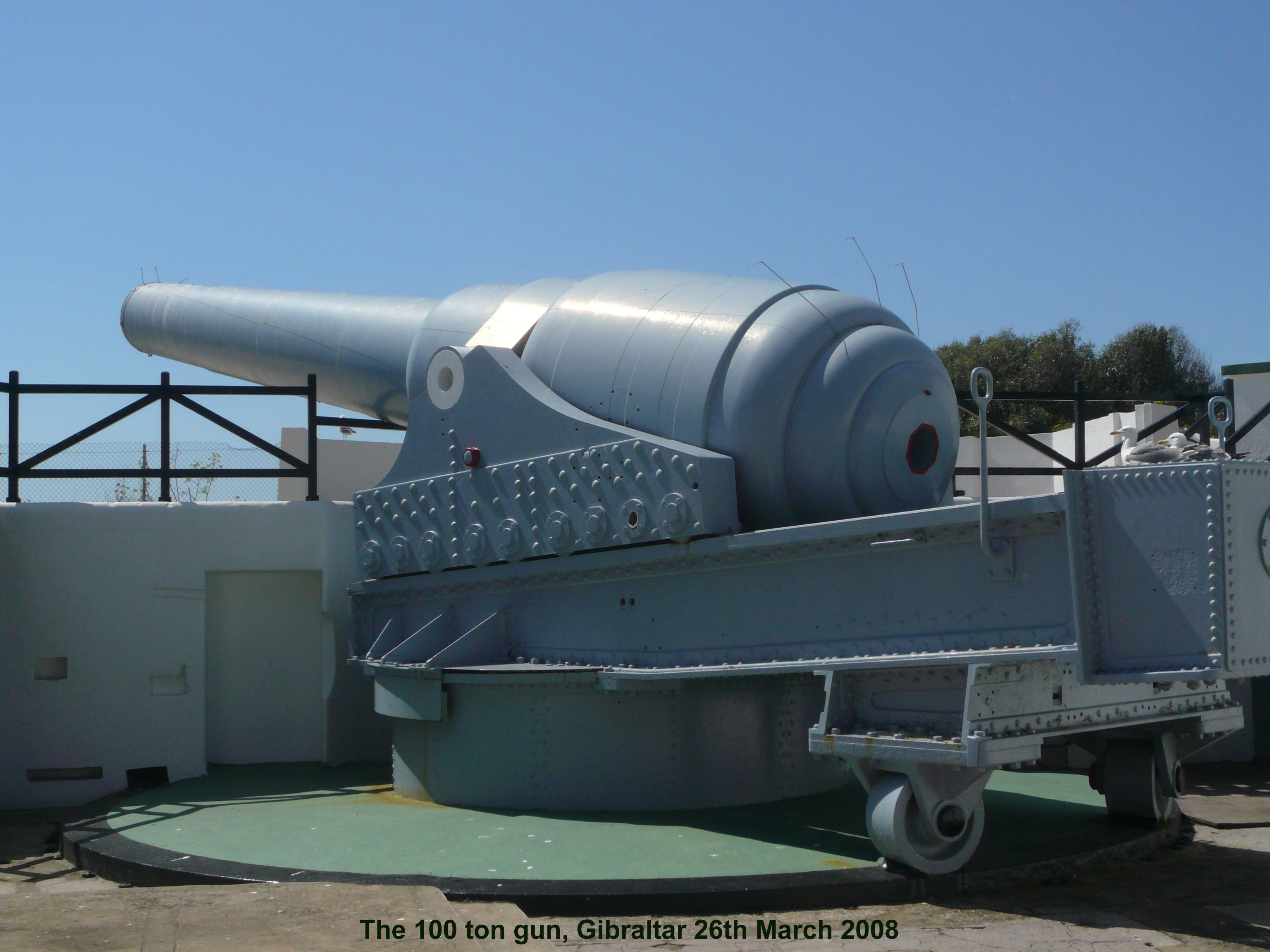
RML 17.72 in (45.0 cm), Gibraltar

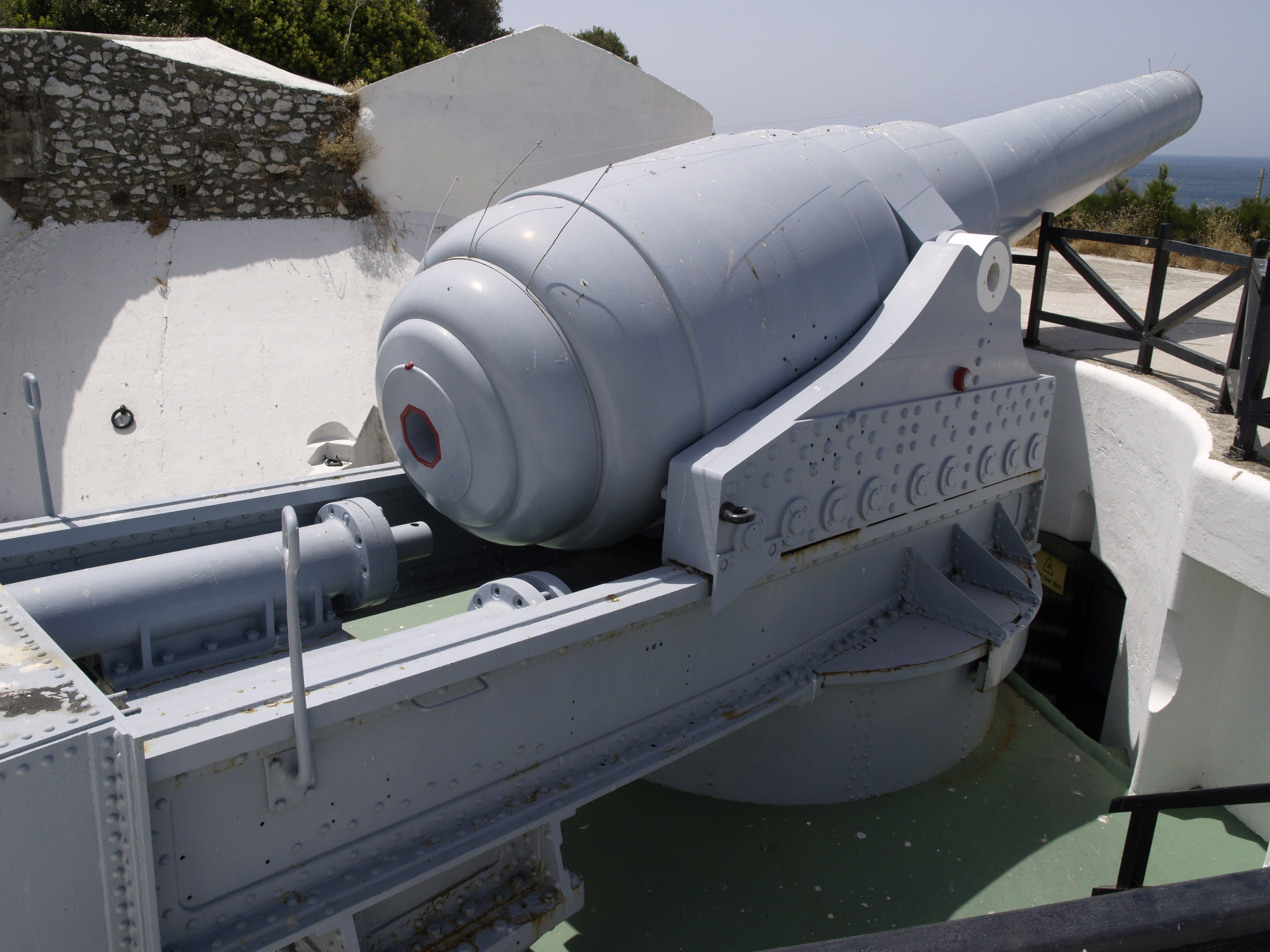
RML 17.72 in (45.0 cm), Gibraltar

Firing and loading video, model
