= Victoria Battery (100 ton gun) =

Artillery battery in Gibraltar

- Part of Fortifications of Gibraltar
- Gibraltar

Site information
- Type: Artillery battery
- Owner: Ministry of Defence

Location
- Location in Gibraltar
- Coordinates: 36.132171°N 5.352193°W

Site history
- Built: 1883

Victoria Battery (one of two identically named batteries named after Queen Victoria) was an artillery battery in the British Overseas Territory of Gibraltar. It was notable for being one of the two batteries in Gibraltar to mount a 100-ton gun.

== History ==
Construction of the battery began in December 1878 on the right flank of an earlier battery, also called Victoria Battery. It was constructed at the same time as Napier of Magdala Battery, both having been among the improvements to the fortifications recommended in January 1868 by Colonel William Jervois. The two batteries cost the British Government £35,707 to build. It was not until March 1883 that the guns arrived at Gibraltar, aboard the SS Stanley, and it took from 12 July to 1 September to move the gun to the battery. The gun was finally mounted on its barbette on 12 September 1883.

The battery's design was similar to that of the 100 ton gun batteries on the British-ruled island of Malta. The gun and its barbette stood in the centre of a rampart of compacted earth standing 18 feet (5.5 m) high over a concrete apron which acted as a glacis and captured rainwater for use in the gun's pneumatic system. The battery's elaborate substructure concealed a series of passageways and magazines capable of holding 87 shells and 107 cartridge canisters. The huge shells could be transported on underground rail tracks to the twin hoists. The gun was reloaded using pneumatic machinery which moved the gun, plunged the barrel, loaded the cartridge and shell through the muzzle and rammed them into place. This was powered by a donkey engine fed by a pump-chamber and boiler room, which were also concealed within the glacis. Compared to the original Maltese positions, Victoria Battery was much less strongly defended from a ground assault. It lacked a defended ditch or defensible barracks to keep out attackers, instead relying on a barbed wire fence which encircled the battery.

The first firings of the new 100 ton guns in Gibraltar took place in 1884, but the weapons were not considered ready until 1889 due to hydraulic problems. The crew at Napier managed to fire a shot every 2.5 minutes, but this ended up cracking the barrel. The wrecked gun was not repairable so the British moved the gun from Victoria to Napier, which was a higher site. The 100-ton guns were the heaviest built and the last gun was considered obsolete sixteen years after the guns' first operations.

In 1900, a proposal was made to reuse the battery to mount four 9-inch rifled muzzle loader (RML) HAF guns to supplement the 10-inch RML HAF guns already installed at Spy Glass and Middle Hill Batteries. They would have had a longer range as they lay closer to the coast. However, the proposal was not acted upon. The Gibraltar Fire Station was built on the battery's right flank in 1937. Parts of the battery's underground works still survive.
