= Firing points =

A firing point is a prepared fighting position from which infantry can defend territory with minimal exposure to return fire. Construction ranges from simple sandbag walls to sophisticated, permanent fortifications. Large artillery emplacements, for example, are vulnerable to attack by lightly armed and mobile troops who can avoid the primary armament's field of fire by dispersal or stealth, or by taking advantage of the limitations in the weapon's traverse or depression. Military engineers typically include firing points in these constructions, allowing defenders to deflect such an attack. This includes slit trenches, pillboxes, and redoubts.
