= Fort Tigné =

Polygonal fort in Tigne Point, Malta

- Il-Forti Tigné
- Tigné Point, Sliema, Malta
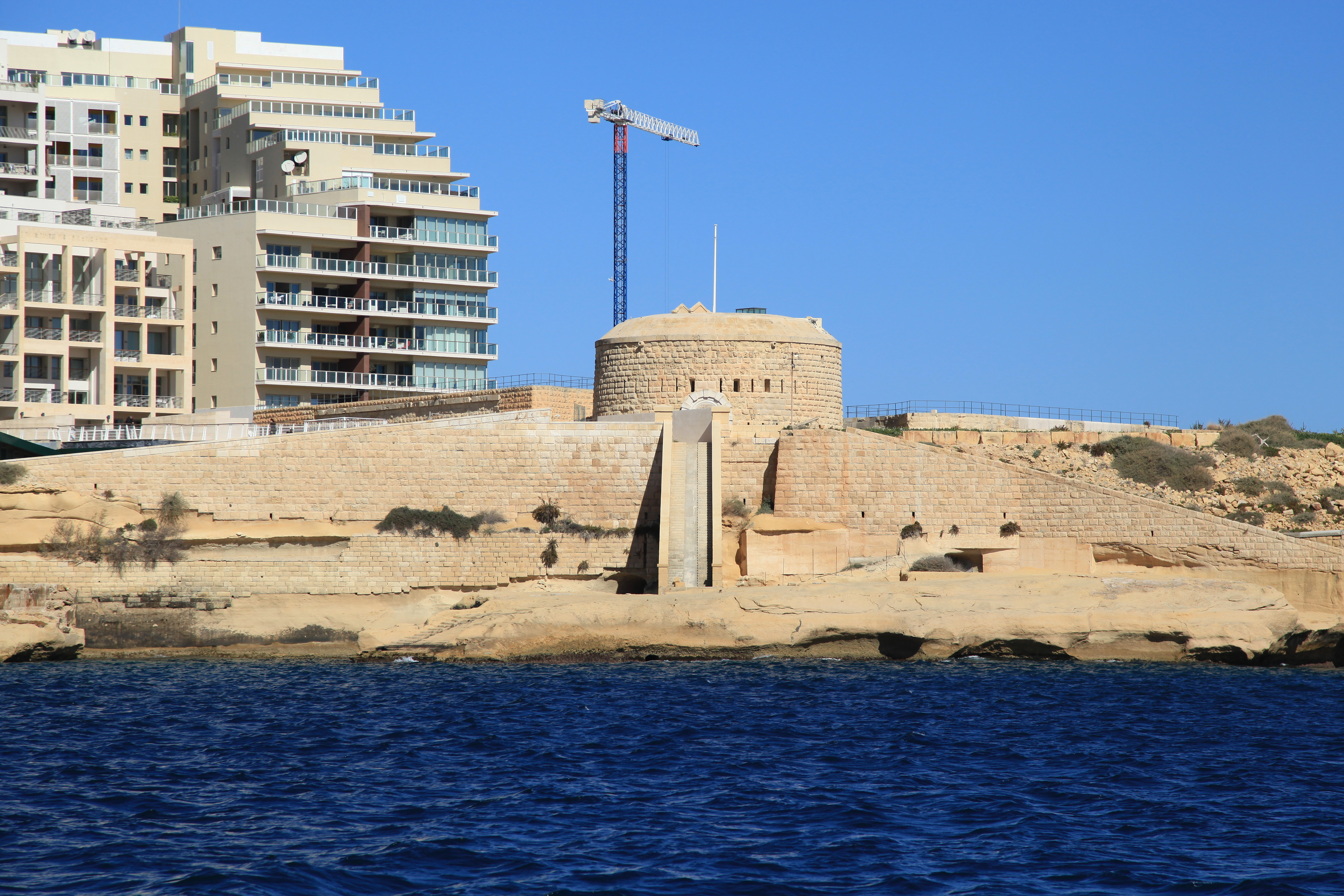
- View of Fort Tigné

Site information
- Type: Polygonal fort
- Owner: Government of Malta
- Controlled by: MIDI plc
- Open to the public: No
- Condition: Intact

Location
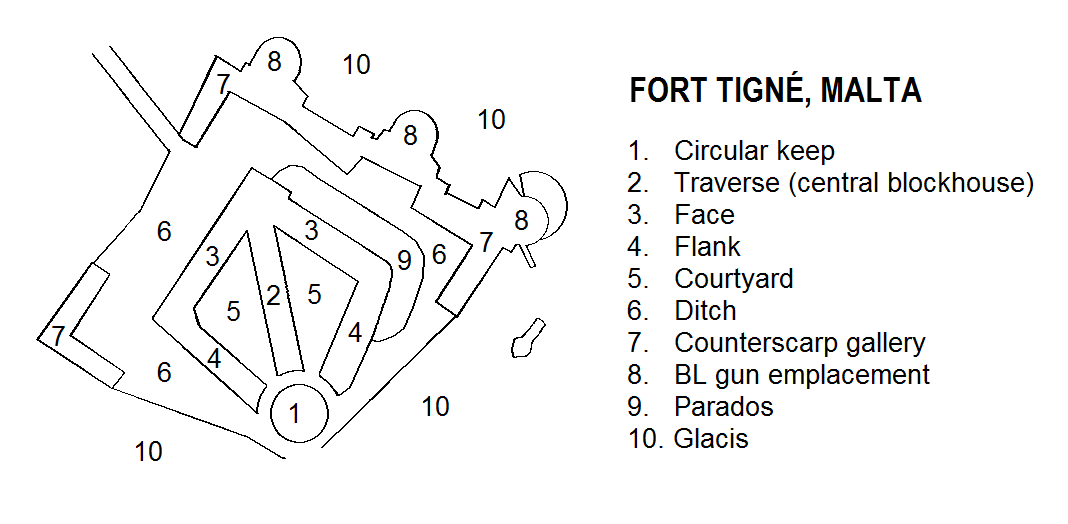
- Map of Fort Tigné
- Coordinates: 35°54′23.3″N 14°30′47.6″E

Site history
- Built: 1793–1795; 1860s–20th century (major modifications)
- Built by: Order of Saint John; British Empire (major modifications)
- In use: 1795–1979
- Materials: Limestone
- Battles/wars: French invasion of Malta (1798); Siege of Malta (1798–1800)

Garrison information
- Past commanders: Joseph Maria von Rechberg (1798)

Fort Tigné (Maltese: Il-Forti Tigné - Il-Fortizza ta' Tigné) is a polygonal fort in Tigné Point, Sliema, Malta. It was built by the Order of Saint John between 1793 and 1795 to protect the entrance to Marsamxett Harbour. It is one of the oldest polygonal forts in the world. The fort, extensively altered by the British in the 19th century, remained in use by the military until 1979.

Fort Tigné was restored in the early 21st century, and it is now in good condition. It has been on Malta's tentative list of UNESCO World Heritage Sites since 1998, as part of the Knights' Fortifications around the Harbours of Malta.

== History ==
=== Background and failed proposals ===
A watch post existed on Punta di Santa Maria (now known as Tigné Point after the fort) in 1417. The post was probably a small unfortified structure, which was manned by three persons. The peninsula played a significant role during the Great Siege of Malta in 1565, when the invading Ottomans built a battery on it in order to bombard, and eventually take, Fort Saint Elmo. After the siege, the peninsula became known as Dragut Point after the Ottoman corsair Dragut.

The first proposal to build a fortification on Dragut Point was made by the Italian military engineer Antonio Maurizio Valperga in 1670. He proposed a fortified city known as Borgo della Città Piccola, with a design similar to Fort Ricasoli. The proposal never materialized, probably due to a lack of funds.

In 1715, Philippe de Vendôme made a second proposal, this time to build a casemated redoubt. A year later, René Jacob de Tigné proposed the construction of a large artillery battery, similar to other coastal batteries that were being built around Malta's coastline at the time.

In 1757, Lembi Battery, an outwork of Fort Manoel, was built on the northern shore of the peninsula. A bastioned entrenchment was proposed in the early 1760s, but it was never built.

=== Construction ===
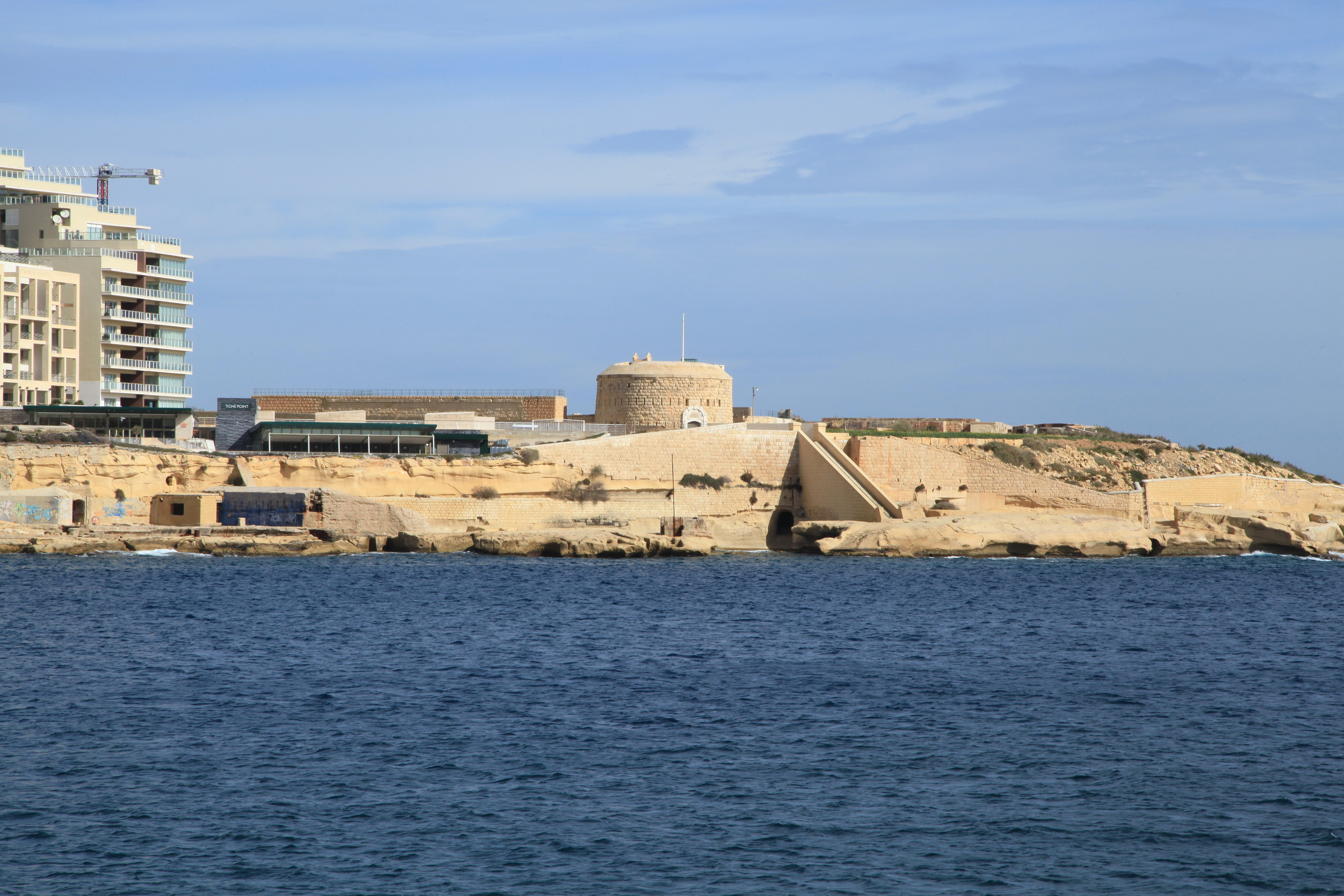
The fort as seen from Valletta

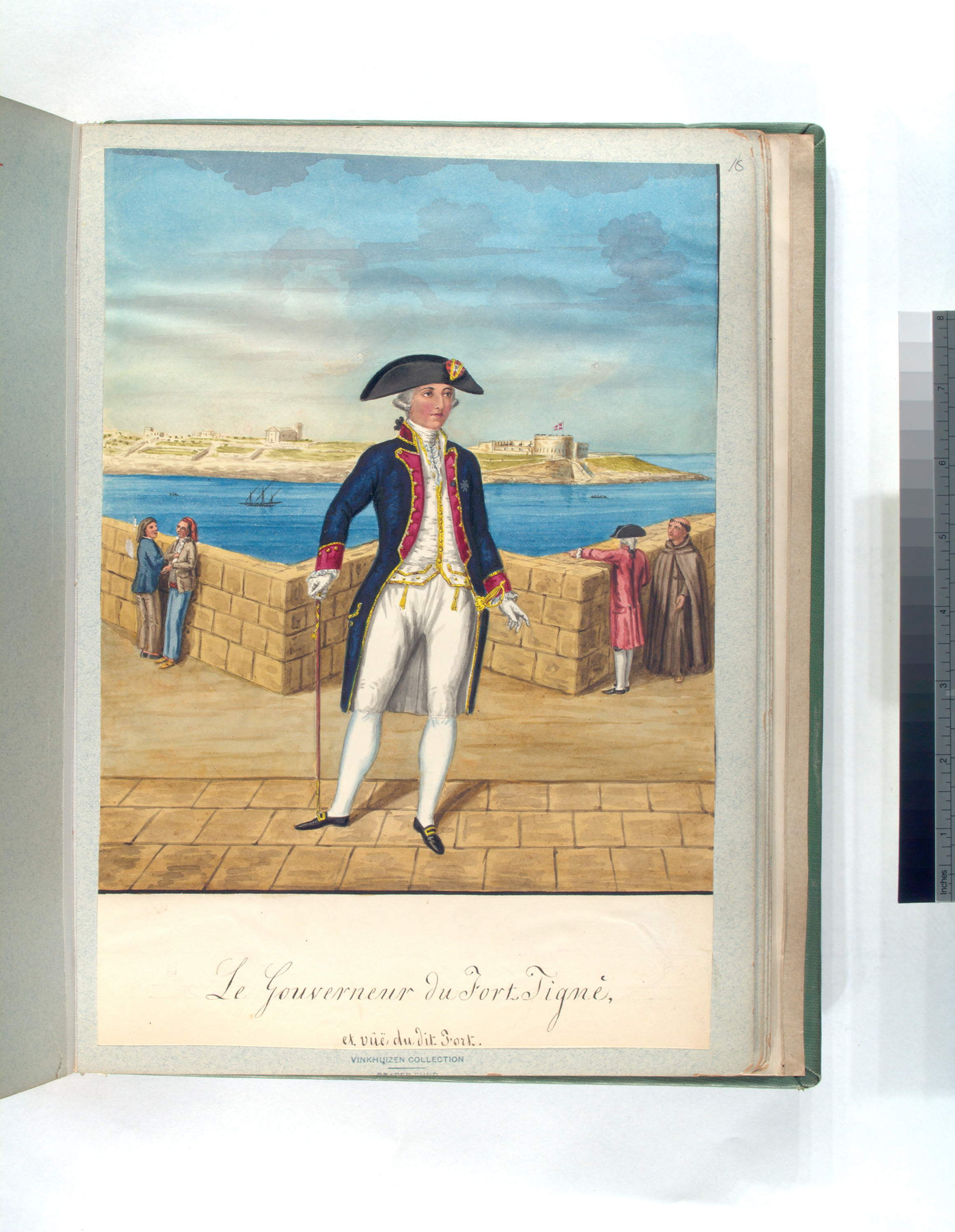
Painting of the Hospitaller Governor of Fort Tigné, with the fort itself in the background

The designs for Fort Tigné were eventually made in 1792, possibly due to the threat of a French invasion. It was commissioned by Grand Master Emmanuel de Rohan-Polduc, and was designed by the newly appointed engineer of the Order, Antoine Étienne de Tousard. Construction began in 1793 under the supervision of capomastro Antonio Cachia, and was completed in July 1795. The fort was named after the knight François René Jacob de Tigné, the nephew of the military engineer René Jacob de Tigné, in recognition of his long years of service with the Order. Tigné also paid 1000 scudi for the construction of the new fort, while de Rohan paid about 6000 scudi. Another 500 scudi were donated by the Bali de Tillet, while the rest of the funds were paid by the Fondazione Manoel.

The new fort was quite small by eighteenth century standards, and it was more similar to a large redoubt than a fort. Despite this, its design was considered to be revolutionary, since it was one of the earliest polygonal forts to be built around the world. Fort Tigné was also the last major fortification built by the Order of Saint John.

Upon the completion of Fort Tigné, the nearby Lembi Battery was decommissioned and converted into a private residence.

In around 1797, a proposal was made to build a fortified city occupying the entire peninsula, with Fort Tigné as its keep. Like the earlier proposals in the late 17th and early 18th centuries, nothing materialized from this plan. The fort was the last project by the order to have offered massive employment locally.

=== French invasion and occupation ===
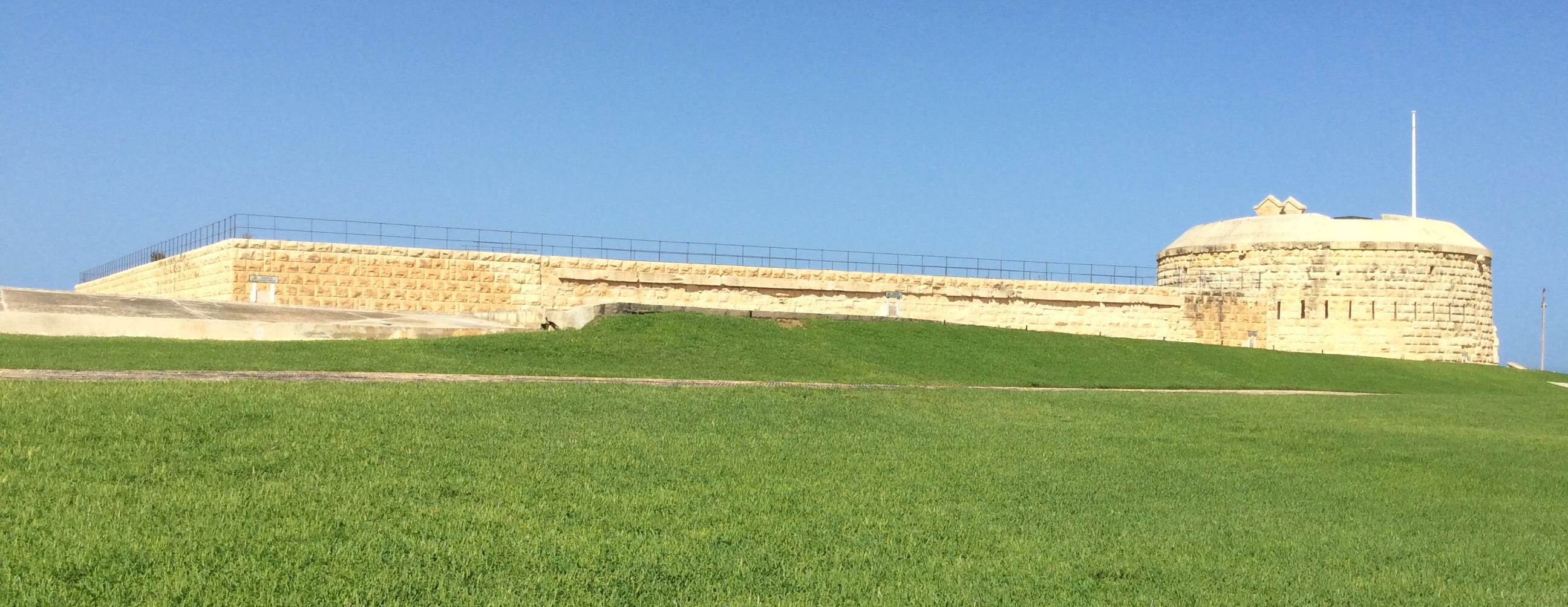
The fort's left flank and keep as seen from its glacis

The fort first saw use during the French invasion of Malta in June 1798. At the time, it was commanded by the Bavarian knight Joseph Maria von Rechberg, and had a garrison made up of men from the Cacciatori, who were a volunteer chasseur light infantry regiment, as well as some bombardiers from the ship San Zaccharia and some Maltese militia. Fort Tigné was armed with 28 guns and 12 mortars as follows, but only 15 of the guns were serviceable:

- Twelve 24-pounder guns
- Six 18-pounder guns
- Six 12-pounder guns
- Four 4-pounder guns
- Six shell-firing mortars
- Six stone-firing mortars

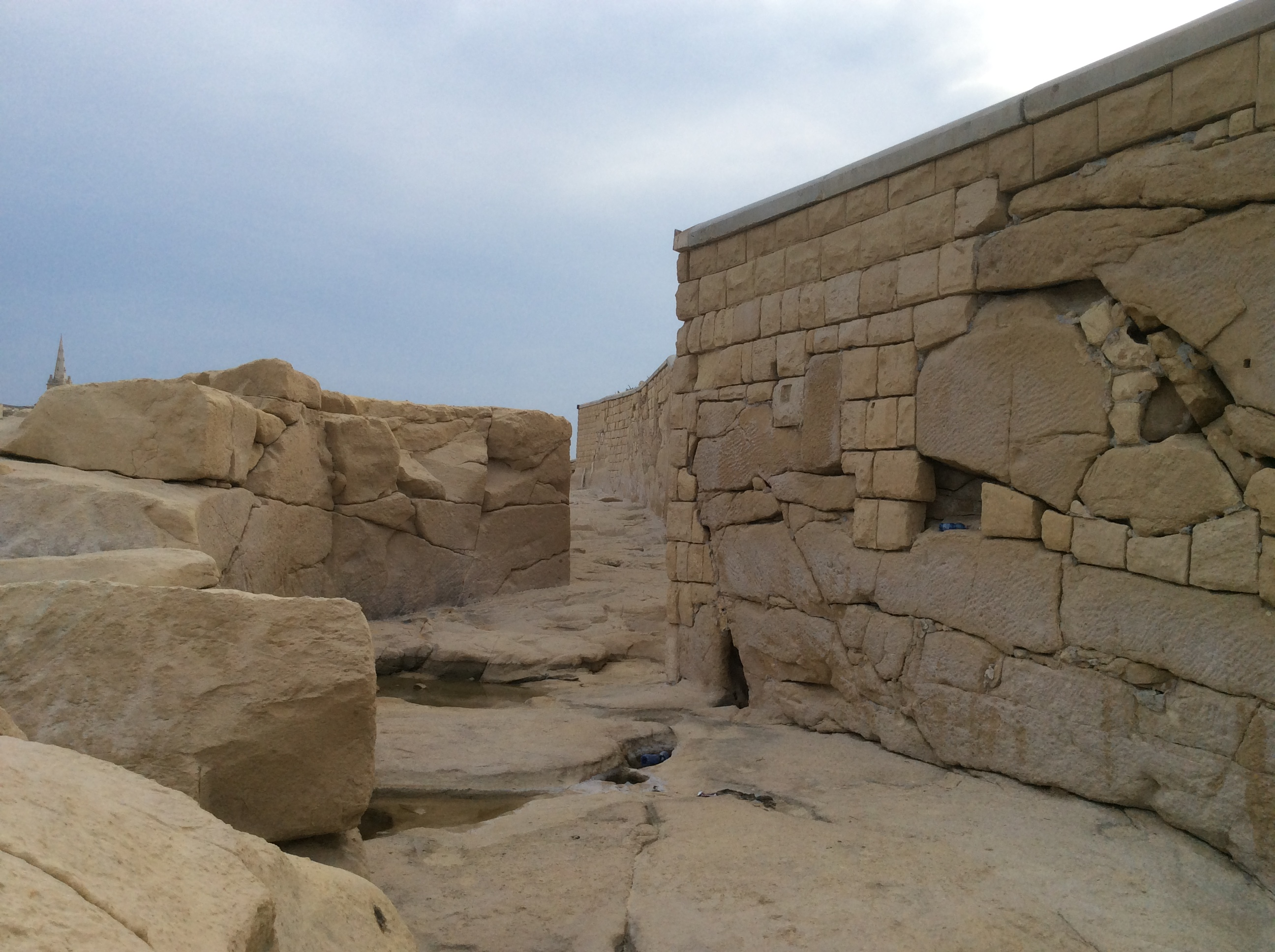
The ditch

Fort Tigné was one of the few fortifications that actively tried to resist the invasion. On 10 June, the French attempted to capture it in a minor skirmish, but were successfully repelled. The fort also fired its guns in support of a counterattack by the Order's navy against the French, and it prevented French ships from entering Marsamxett.

On 11 June, the French bombarded the fort from land and sea. The fort's garrison fought back, and its commander, Rechberg, managed to bring in more ammunition from Floriana. On 12 June, the bombardment of the fort continued, but by then the French had captured Valletta, Floriana, and Fort Manoel. The Maltese militia left the fort, reducing its garrison to 80 men. By the end of the day, the ammunition had run out, and parts of the fort were damaged during the bombardment. When Rechberg and his soldiers attempted to escape, the French captured them, and the fort was in French hands by 13 June.

During the subsequent Maltese uprising and insurrection against French rule, Maltese insurgents built six batteries facing Fort Tigné, which was held by the French. By 1799, its armament was reduced to 21 guns, which were as follows:

- Seven 24-pounder guns
- Six 18-pounder guns
- Four 10-pounder guns
- Four 4-pounder guns

=== British rule ===
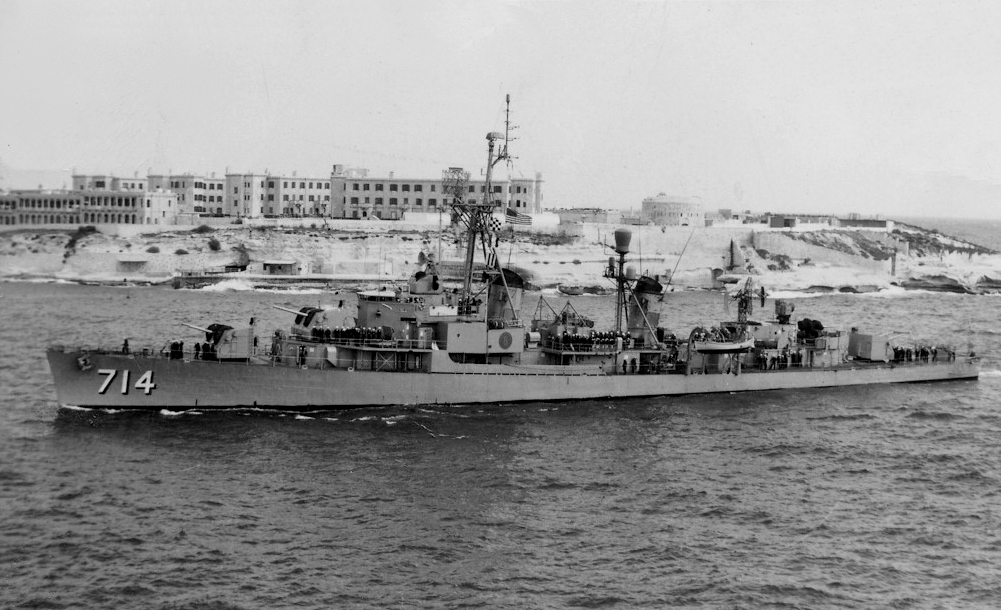
USS William R. Rush at Tigné Point in 1961. The fort and barracks are visible in the background.

Fort Tigné was officially taken over by the British military in September 1800, and it became permanently garrisoned in 1805. The parts damaged during the French occupation were repaired, but no major changes were initially made. In 1815, after several years of British occupation, the fort was armed with 30 guns:

- Fourteen 24-pounder guns
- Twelve 18-pounder guns
- Four 24-pounder carronades

In the 1860s, the British saw Fort Tigné as the 'perfection of a small fort without flanks ... capable of considerable resistance', and it was used as the prototype for other polygonal forts built elsewhere. By then, it was armed mainly with 68-pounder guns. The parapet on the circular keep was demolished to make way for a single gun mounted on a traversing platform, similar to the ones found on the Martello towers. By 1864, the fort was armed with eighteen 32-pounder guns, four 10-inch guns, and another 32-pounder on the keep.

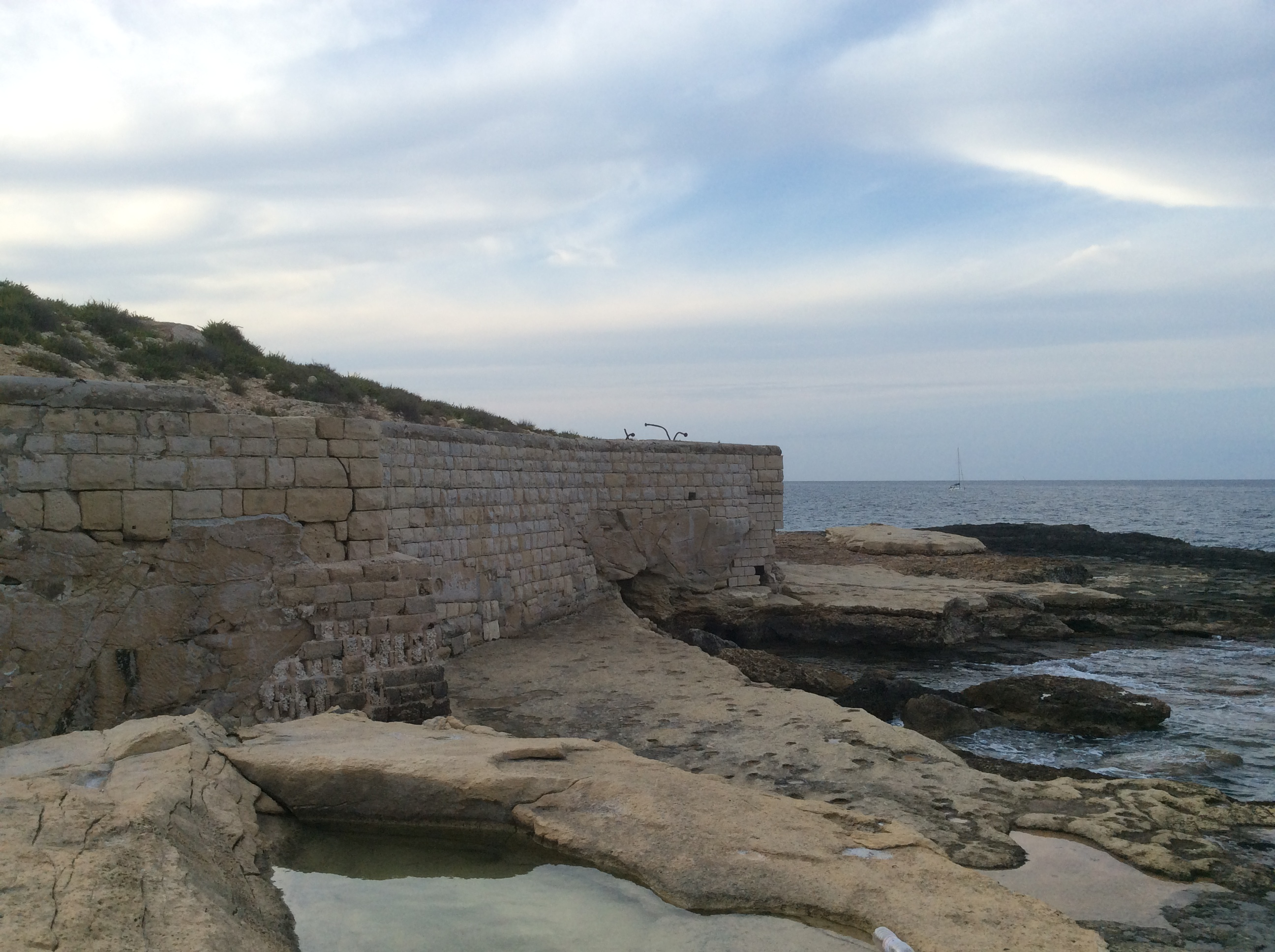
A part of the fort with British modifications as seen in 2017

The first major modifications were made between 1870 and 1875, when some of the parapets with embrasures were demolished to make way for emplacements for RML 9 inch 12 ton guns. The remainder of the fort underwent further significant changes over the following years. In the 1880s, the British considered demolishing the fort and replacing it with a larger fortification, but in 1888 it was proposed that instead of demolition, the height of the ramparts should be reduced to the level of the glacis. In the 1890s, gun emplacements for breech-loading (BL) guns were built on the glacis, while further modifications were made when parts of the structure were converted to gun crew accommodation or magazines.

Defence of Tigné Point was further enhanced with the construction of Cambridge Battery between 1878 and 1886. Garden Battery was then built between 1889 and 1894, covering the area between Cambridge Battery and Fort Tigné. Barrack blocks were constructed on the rest of the peninsula in the early 20th century.

The fort was included on the Antiquities List of 1925. It was damaged by aerial bombardment during World War II.

=== Recent history ===
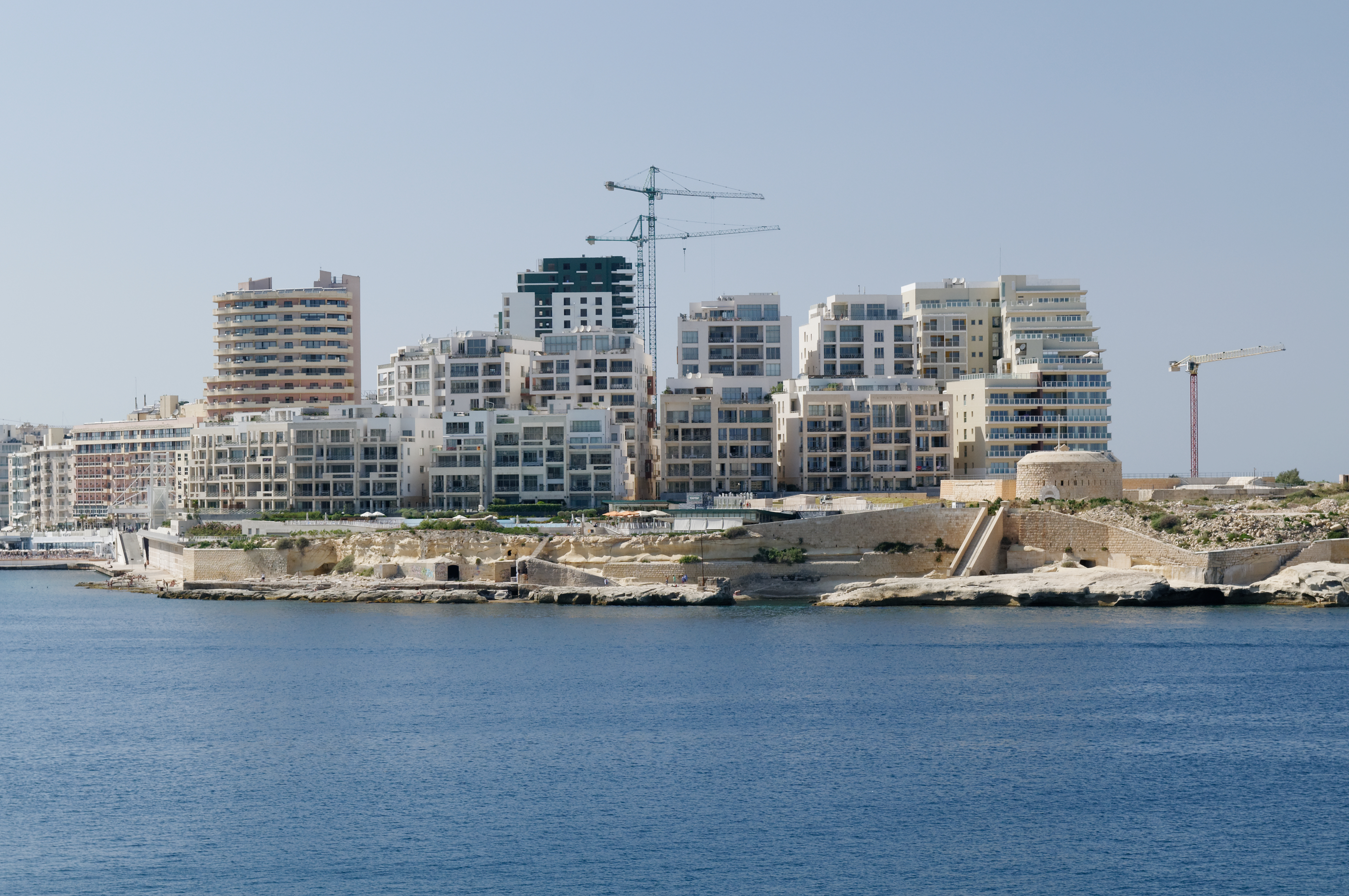
The built up Tigné Point with Fort Tigné in the foreground

When British troops left Malta in 1979, the fort was abandoned and fell into a state of disrepair. Parts of it were also vandalized. At some point it was also used as a desalination plant.

Since the early 2000s, the Tigné Point peninsula is being redeveloped by MIDI plc. The British barracks were demolished, and high-rise apartments were built instead. In 2008, MIDI plc also restored the fort as part of the project. The alterations made by the British, such as the BL gun emplacements, were also repaired, while landscaped gardens and walkways were built on the glacis.

There were a number of proposals on how to use the building, including for catering facilities, as a military museum, an exhibition space or as an art gallery. The key of the chapel around Fort Tigne still exists and is now located at Stella Maris Church.

== Layout ==
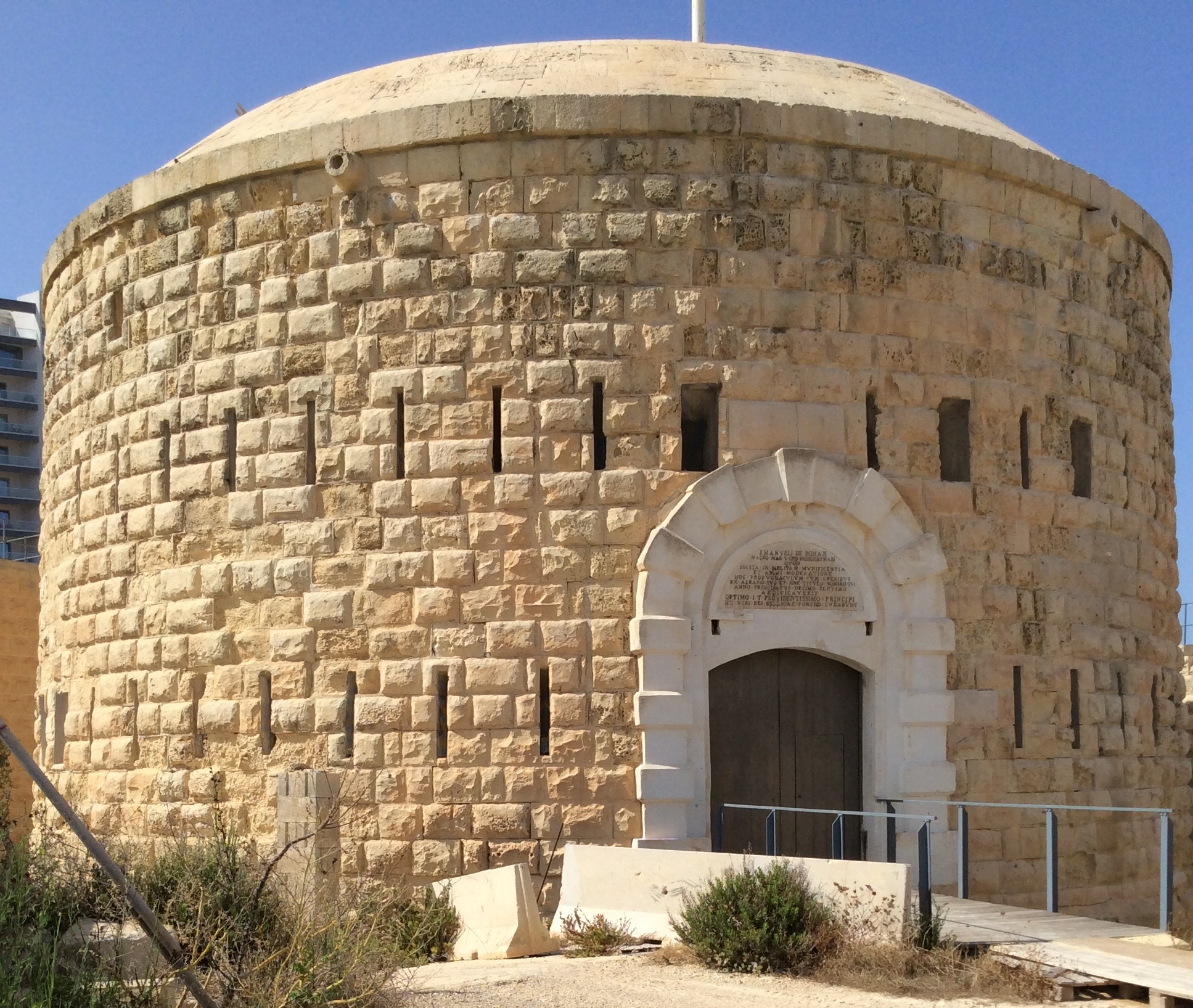
The circular keep

The design of Fort Tigné was mainly based on the Lunette d'Arçon, as well as the work of Marc René, marquis de Montalembert. The final design by Antoine Étienne de Tousard resulted in a revolutionary fortification, which made it one of the oldest polygonal forts in the world.

The most noticeable feature of the fort is the circular keep. This was modeled on the reduit de surete of the Lunette d'Arçon, and it also bears similarities to the tour-reduits built in Malta in the early 18th century (the only surviving example is Vendôme Tower). It had two rows of musketry loopholes, and its roof contained a parapet with four embrasures. The latter was replaced with a sloping parapet to mount a single gun in the 1860s. The keep also contains the main gate, above which is a commemorative plaque.

The main body of the fort consisted of a diamond-shaped structure made up of two flanks and two faces. The two faces and the right flank originally had embrasures, but they were dismantled in the late 19th century by the British. A blockhouse, with courtyards on either side, was located in the centre of the fort.

The main structure and the keep were surrounded by a ditch, which had three counterscarp musketry galleries. These were also significantly altered by the British.

The British also built three emplacements for breech-loading (BL) guns on the fort's glacis.

== Tignè Tunnels ==
Underneath the fort there is a maze of tunnels stretching for kilometres. These were dug before World War II by hand.
