= Lembi Battery =

Artillery battery in Sliema, Malta

- Batterija t'Għar il-Lembi
- Part of Fort Manoel
- Sliema, Malta

Site information
- Type: Artillery battery

Location
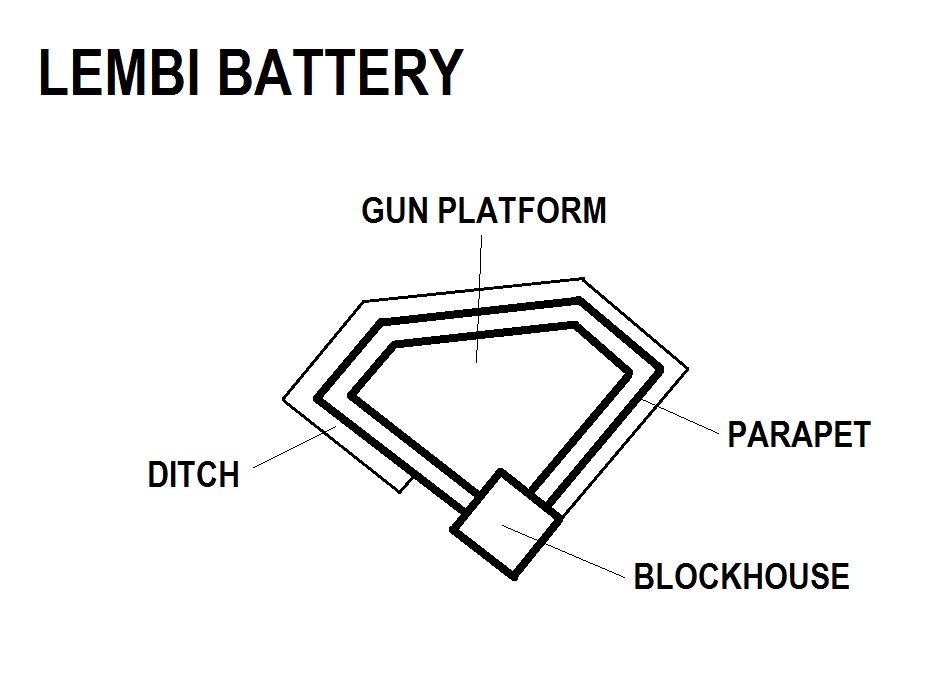
- Map of Lembi Battery
- Coordinates: 35°54′33.3″N 14°30′31.4″E

Site history
- Built: 1757
- Built by: Order of Saint John
- In use: 1757–1795
- Materials: Limestone
- Fate: Demolished

Lembi Battery, also known as Qala Lembi Battery (Maltese: Batterija t'Għar il-Lembi), was an artillery battery in Sliema, Malta. It was built in 1757 by the Order of Saint John, and was considered as an outwork of Fort Manoel. The battery became obsolete with the construction of Fort Tigné in 1795, and it was briefly used as a summer residence before being demolished. In the 1870s, Cambridge Battery was built close to the site of Lembi Battery.

The battery was also referred to as Fort Lembi, Lembi Tower or Lembi Redoubt.

== History ==
Lembi Battery was built in 1757, and was regarded as an outwork of Fort Manoel, as it was intended to prevent an attacking enemy from bombarding the northern flank of the fort. The battery had a triangular gun platform and a small blockhouse attached to one side, and it was surrounded by a ditch. It was armed with six 12-pounder guns.

The battery became obsolete when Fort Tigné was built in 1795, and its artillery was removed. It became a summer residence of the knight Fra Amante de Fargues.

During the French blockade of 1798–1800, Maltese insurgents built a number of batteries close to the former Lembi Battery in order to bombard Fort Tigné, which was held by the French.

The battery was demolished later on in the 19th century. In 1878, Cambridge Battery began to be built close to its site.
