= French invasion of Malta =

1798 invasion, part of the Mediterranean campaign

- Part of the Mediterranean campaign of 1798
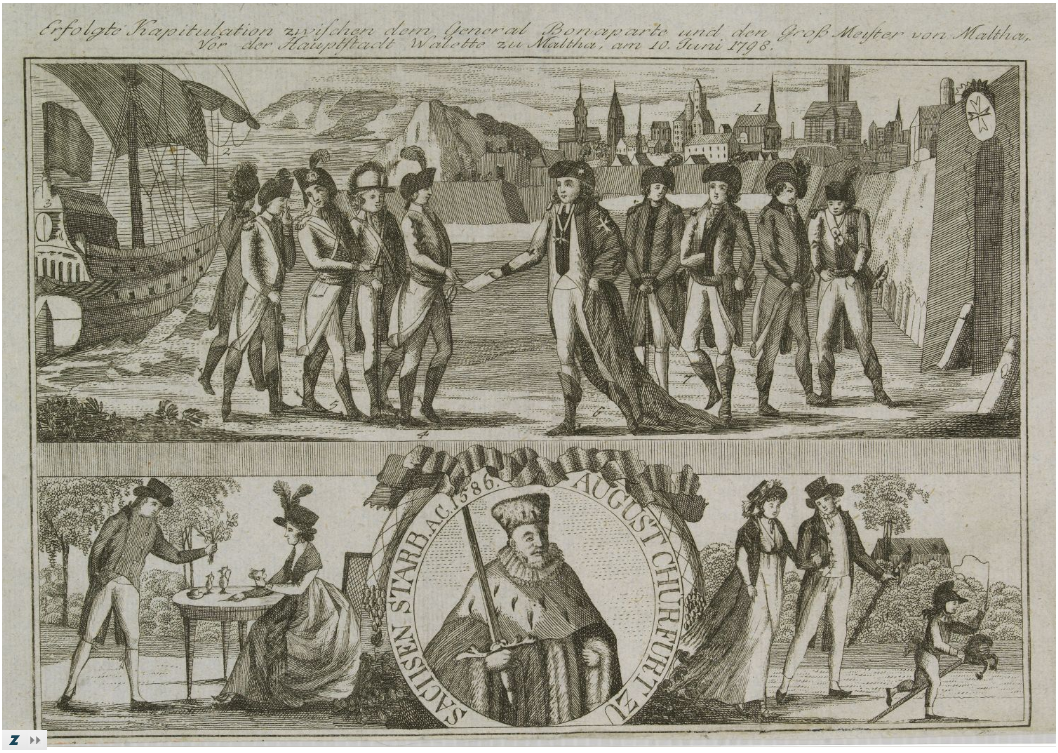
- Engraving depicting Malta's capitulation to Napoleon
Date	10–12 June 1798 (2 days)
Location	Malta and Gozo 35.90°N 14.45°E
Result	French victory
Territorial changes	French occupation of Malta

Belligerents
France	Hospitaller Malta

Commanders and leaders
Napoleon Bonaparte; Jean-Andoche Junot; Louis Desaix; Louis Baraguey d'Hilliers; Claude-Henri Belgrand de Vaubois; Jean Reynier	Ferdinand von Hompesch (surrendered)

War of the Second Coalition:
Egypt and Syria
current battle
Napoleon in command till 23 August 1799

The French First Republic, led by Napoleon Bonaparte, successfully invaded the islands of Malta and Gozo, then ruled by the Knights Hospitaller, in June 1798 as part of the Mediterranean campaign of the French Revolutionary Wars.

The initial landings were met with some resistance from both the Order and the Maltese militia, but in less than a day the French had taken control of the entire Maltese archipelago except for the well-fortified harbour area that included the capital Valletta. The Order had the means to withstand a siege, but a series of circumstances, including discontent among its own French members and the native Maltese population, led to a truce which ended with the capitulation of the Order.

The invasion therefore ended the 268-year-long Hospitaller rule in Malta, and resulted in the French occupation of Malta. A few months after the invasion, discontent due to reforms that were taking place led to an uprising, which evolved into a blockade of the French garrison by Maltese insurgents aided by the British, Neapolitans and Portuguese. The blockade lasted for two years, and ended with the French surrendering to the British in 1800, making Malta a protectorate and initiating 164 years of British rule.

== Background ==
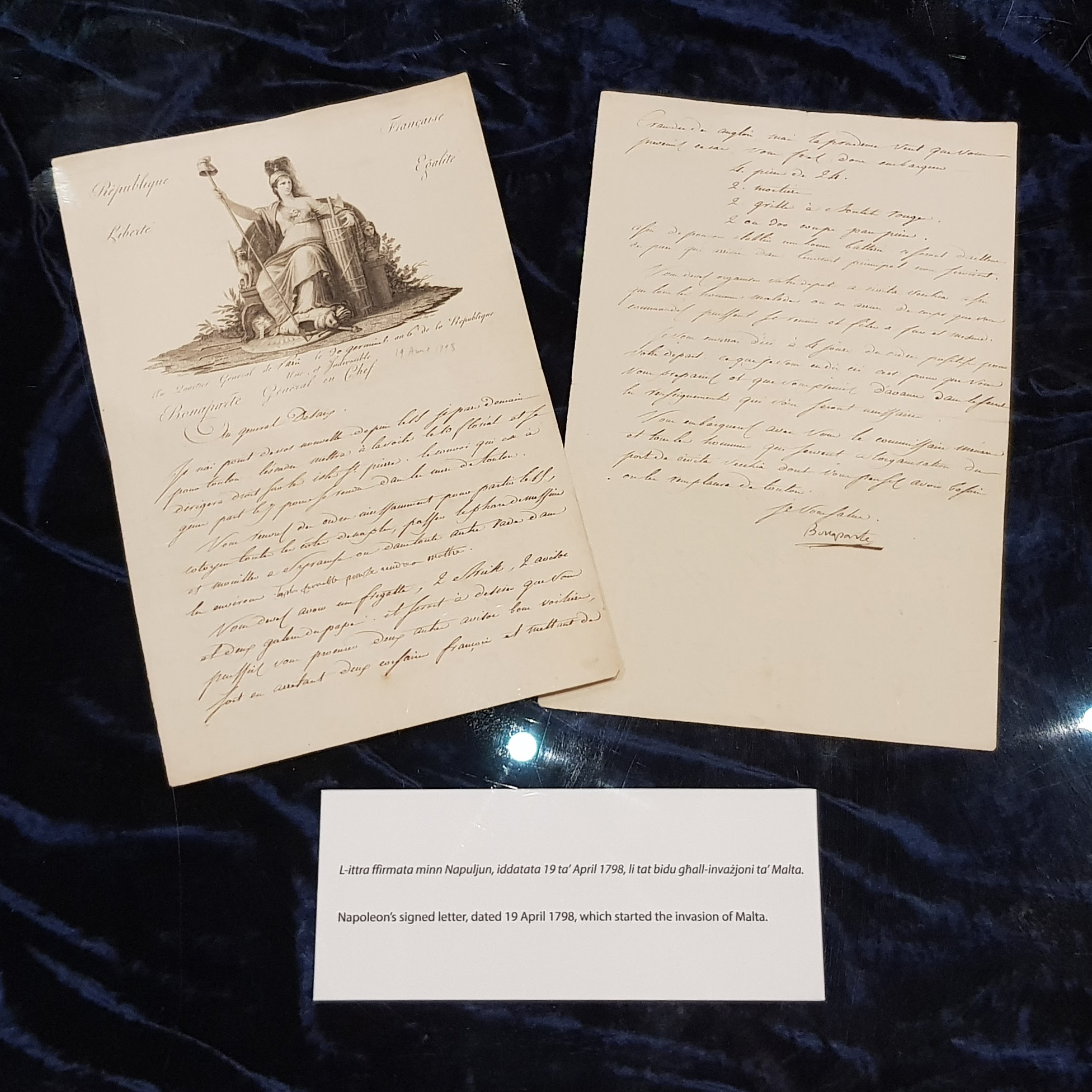
Letter dated 19 April 1798 written by Napoleon instructing General Louis Desaix to set sail from Civitavecchia and meet up with him at Malta

During the 18th century, the Order of St. John began to decline as its function of fighting the Muslims became outdated. It came to rely on France, which was an important source of revenue, and the majority of the Order's members were French. The Order received major setbacks following the French Revolution, and by 1792 there were serious financial difficulties. Meanwhile, France and the other major European powers began to take an interest in Malta due to its strategic position in the central Mediterranean and its system of fortifications, which was one of the strongest in Europe.

By March 1798, the Order had received information that the French were amassing armaments in Toulon. However, it was believed that they were being prepared for an attack on Portugal and Ireland, and Grand Master Ferdinand von Hompesch zu Bolheim did not believe that an attack on Malta was imminent. Hompesch might have been informed of the attack on 4 June, although the authenticity of the document in question has been disputed.

== Invasion ==
=== 6–9 June: Arrival of the French fleet and ultimatum ===
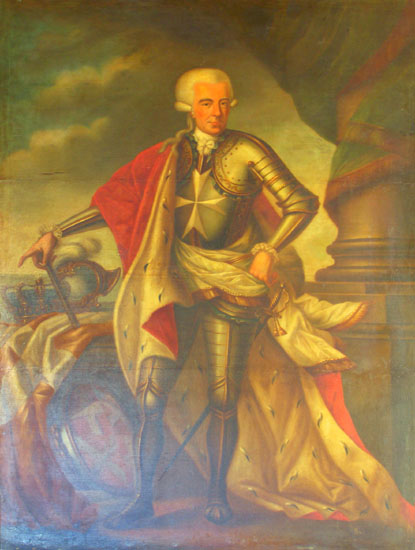
Painting of Ferdinand von Hompesch zu Bolheim, the last Grand Master to rule Malta

The French fleet was sighted off Gozo on 6 June, and Hompesch summoned a council of war and called out the militia. Maltese soldiers and militia led by members of the Order were responsible for the defence of the fortified cities in the Grand Harbour area: Valletta, Floriana, Birgu, Senglea and Cospicua. The other settlements and coastline were to be defended by the country militia and some knights including members of the Order's navy.

Meanwhile, the French had made preparations for landing and occupying the Maltese Islands. On 9 June, Napoleon sent his aide-de-camp Jean-Andoche Junot to request permission from the Grand Master for the French fleet to water at Malta. Hompesch called a Council meeting to discuss whether to allow them or not, and it was decided to only allow four ships at a time to enter the harbours. This was in accordance with an old statute which forbade entry to more than four ships of Christian countries to enter Maltese ports at once during periods of hostilities.

On 10 June, Napoleon dictated an ultimatum which was written and signed by Caruson, and it was delivered to Hompesch. The message mentioned Napoleon's disappointment at the Order's refusal to allow more French ships to enter the harbours, and it mentioned the considerable French forces and the futility of any resistance. The letter further asked Hompesch to conclude an arrangement so as to avoid hostilities. It stated that the French were treating the Order as an enemy, but it promised to respect the religion, customs and property of the Maltese population.

=== 10 June: French landings and initial resistance ===
On the morning of 10 June, the French began landing their forces at four different locations of the Maltese Islands: St. Paul's Bay, St. Julian's and Marsaxlokk on mainland Malta and the area around Ramla Bay on Gozo.

==== Landing at St. Paul's Bay ====
The landing in St. Paul's Bay in northern Malta was undertaken by troops commanded by Louis Baraguey d'Hilliers. The Maltese offered some resistance, but they were quickly forced to surrender. The French managed to capture all the fortifications commanding St. Paul's Bay and nearby Mellieħa without any casualties. The defenders' casualties consisted of a knight and a Maltese soldier being killed, and around 150 knights and Maltese being captured.

==== Landing at Marsaxlokk ====
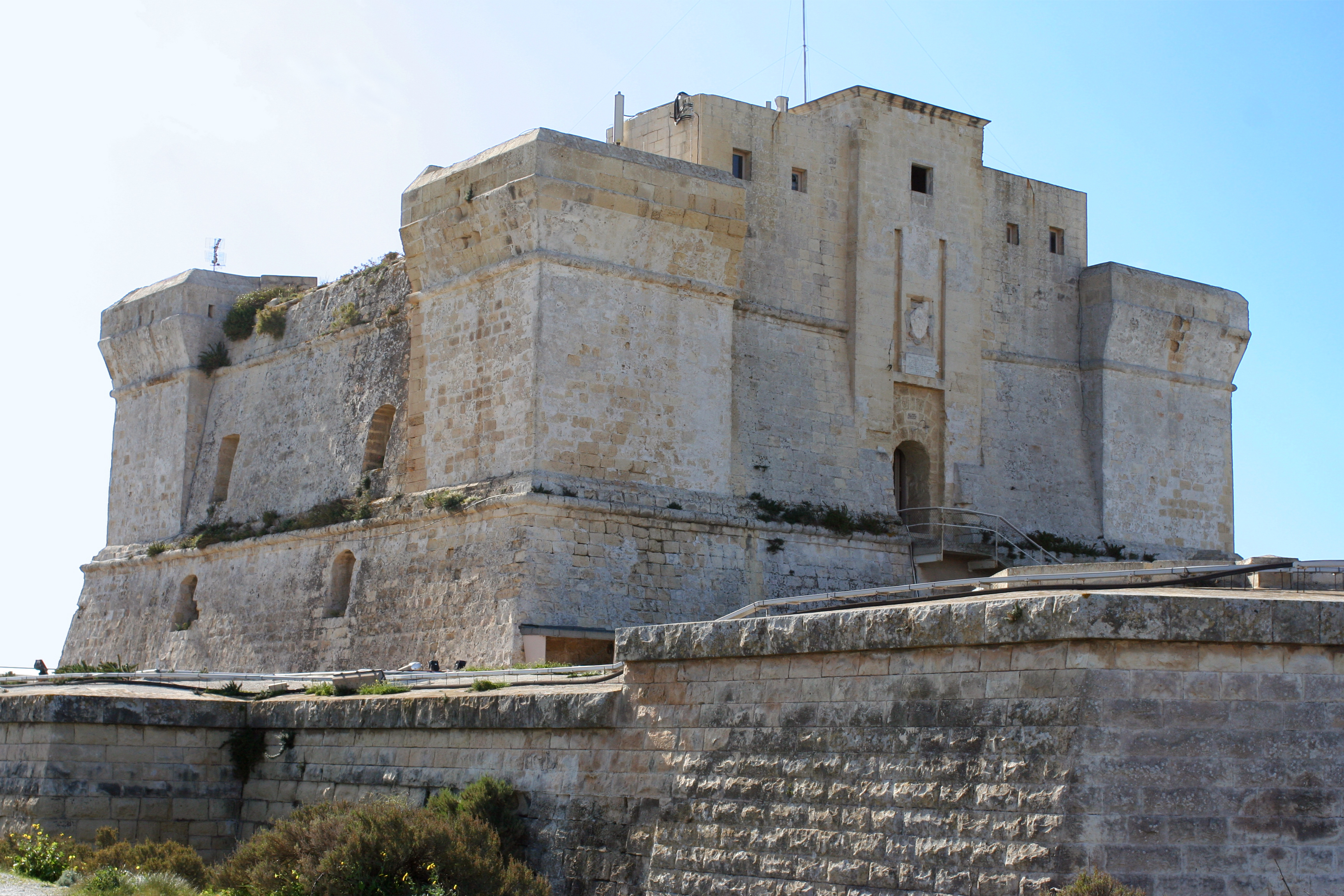
Fort Rohan, which fell to the French after some resistance

A force commanded by Louis Desaix landed at Marsaxlokk, a large bay in southern Malta. The landing was successful, and the French managed to capture Fort Rohan after some resistance. Following the capture of the fort, the defenders abandoned the other coastal fortifications in the bay, and the French landed the bulk of their forces unopposed.

==== Landing at St. Julian's and capture of Mdina ====
Forces led by Claude-Henri Belgrand de Vaubois landed at St. Julian's and the surrounding area. A galley, two galleots and a chaloup of the Order's navy sailed out of the Grand Harbour in an attempt to prevent the landing, but their effort was futile.

Three battalions of the 4th Light Infantry and two battalions of the 19th of the Line landed, and were met by some companies of the Maltese Regiment who offered token resistance before retreating to Valletta. The French forces surrounded the city, being joined by Desaix's troops who had made a successful landing at Marsaxlokk. The Hospitaller defenders then attempted a counterattack and sent out troops against the French, who began to retreat. The Hospitallers and Maltese advanced, but were ambushed by a battalion of the 19th of the Line and were thrown into disarray. The French then began a general advance, and the defenders retreated back to the fortified city. The flag of the Order at the head of the defending force was captured by the French.

With Valletta surrounded, Vaubois led some of the troops to the old city of Mdina, where the remaining militia had retreated following the landings. At a city council meeting at the Bishop's Palace, it was decided that resistance was futile and they agreed to capitulate if the people's religion, liberty and property would be respected. By about 12.00, the terms had been agreed and the city capitulated to Vaubois.

==== Landing and capture of Gozo ====
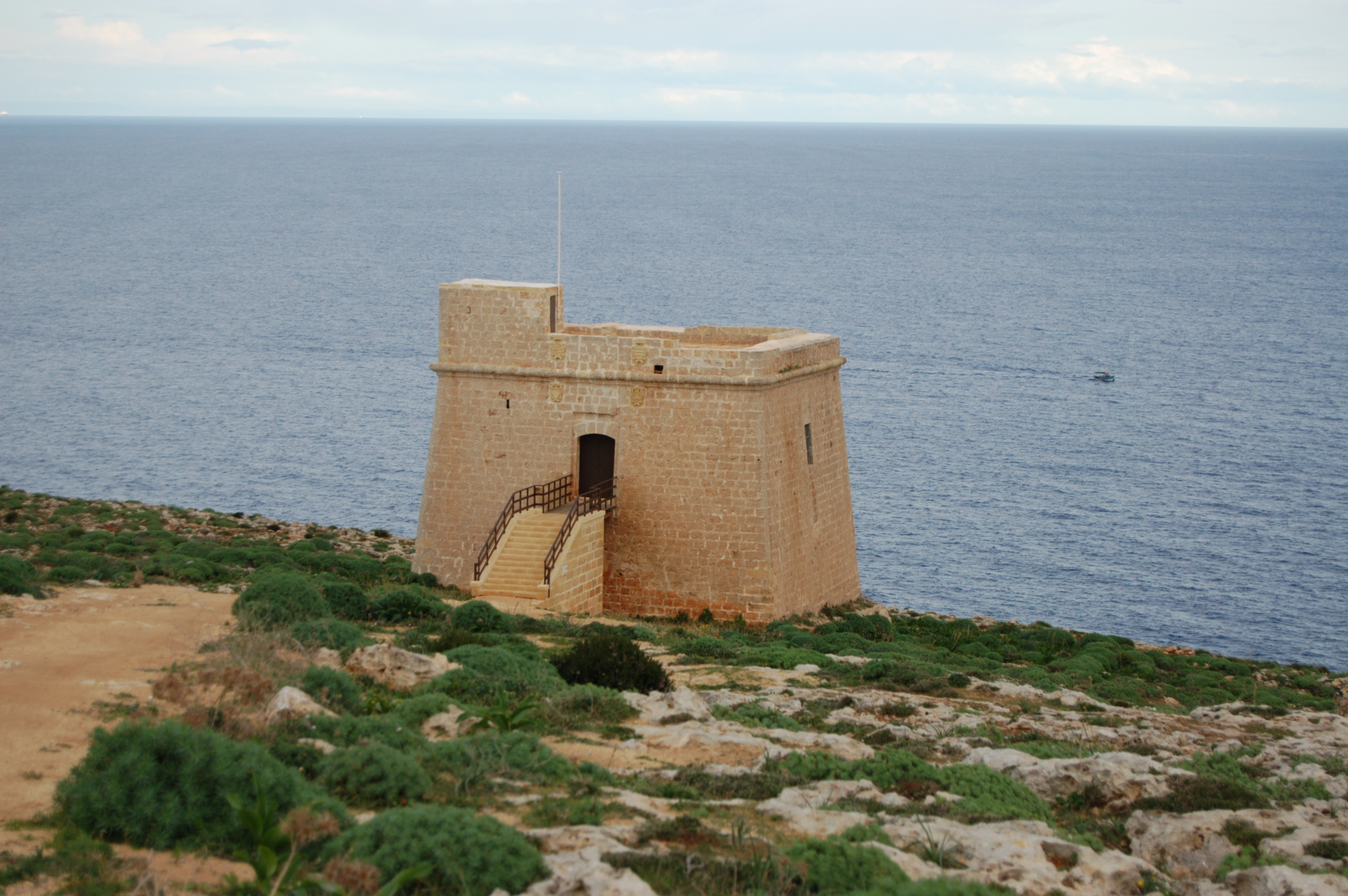
The Sopu Tower, which was located close to the landing site and offered some resistance to the invasion

The French force which landed on the island of Gozo consisted of the 3rd Company of Grenadiers and the 95th Demi-Brigade, and it was led by Jean Reynier. Jean Urbain Fugière accompanied Reynier and took part in the attack. Gozo was defended by a total of 2300 men, consisting of a company of 300 regular troops (30 of whom were mounted), a regiment of 1200 coastguardsmen and 800 militia.

The landing began at around 13.00 in the area of Redum Kebir (Maltese: Rdum il-Kbir) in the vicinity of Nadur, between the Ramla Right Battery and the Sopu Tower. The defenders opened fire on the French, and they were aided by artillery from the batteries at Ramla and the Sopu Tower. French bombards returned fire to the batteries, and the French managed to advance to higher ground despite heavy fire. The batteries at Ramla were taken, and the French managed to land the rest of their troops. Casualties among the invading force included Sergeant-Major Bertrand, who was killed by gunfire during the landing.

Reynier and part of the 95th Demi-Brigade subsequently marched to Fort Chambray which commanded Gozo's main harbour, Mġarr, in an attempt to cut off communication with Malta. The fort had been filled with refugees from the surrounding villages, and it capitulated at around 14.00. Meanwhile, the rest of the 95th Demi-Brigade marched through Xagħra to the Cittadella in the island's capital Rabat. A detachment occupied the Marsalforn Tower. The Cittadella surrendered by nightfall. The French captured around 116 artillery pieces, 44 of which were in the Cittadella, 22 at Chambray and the remainder in the various coastal fortifications. Muskets and three stores of wheat were also captured.

=== 10–12 June: Situation in the harbour area ===
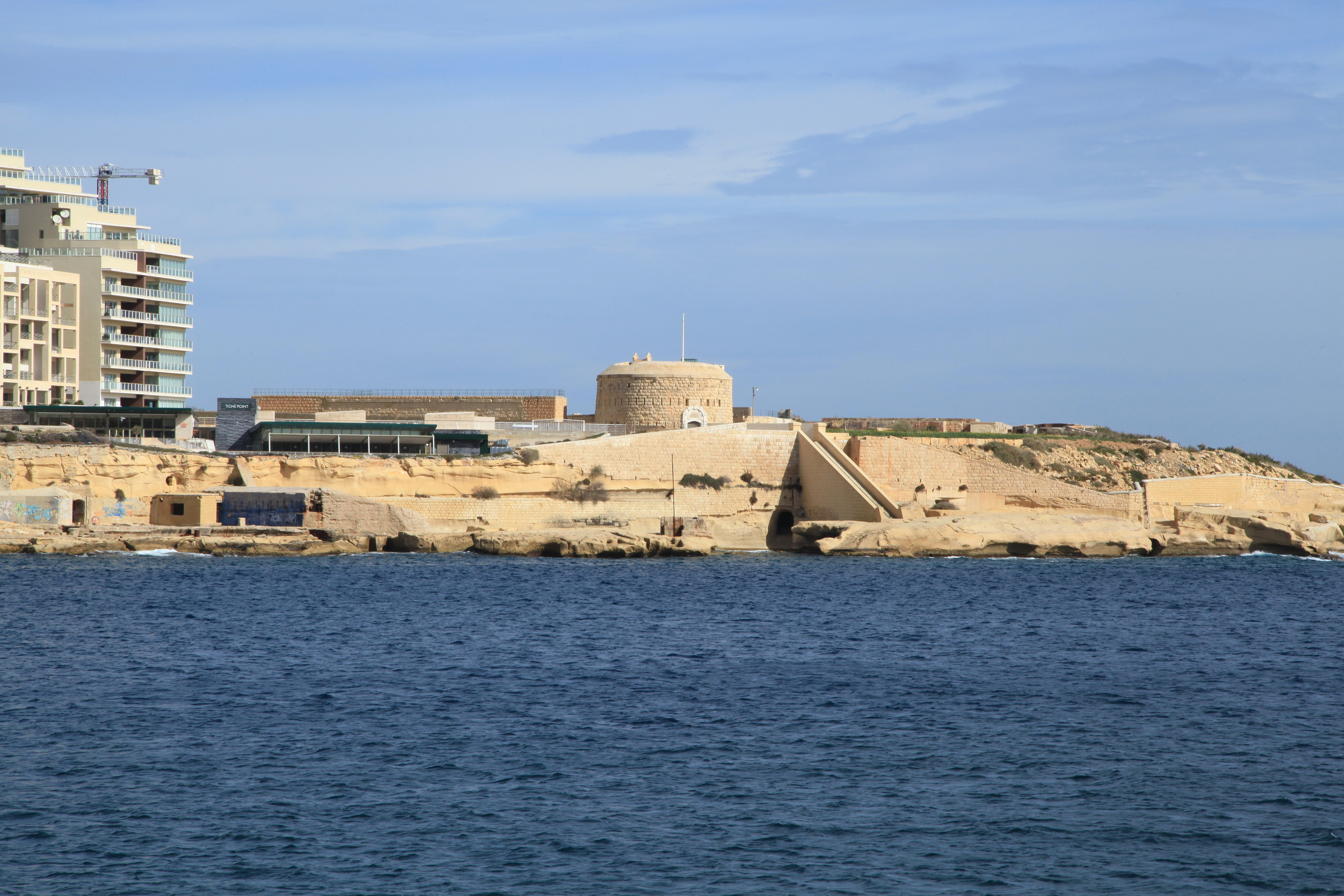
Fort Tigné, which attempted to resist the French invasion and was heavily bombarded in the process

Following the successful landings, there was widespread commotion, confusion and discontent in Valletta and the Cottonera. The Grand Master and the Council remained assembled at the Palace, together with a number of other knights. The clergy organised processions with the statue of Saint Paul, praying for mercy. Two Frenchmen who were in the city were murdered on the suspicion that they were involved in the invasion. There were fears that the prisoners of the Slaves' Prison would rise in revolt. Fears of a Maltese uprising against the Order increased after two young knights were murdered in the Cottonera.

Within the city, there were factions who supported the French and others who opposed them. Some of the French members of the Order had Republican leanings and supported Napoleon. Jean de Bosredon de Ransijat, a Commander and Grand Cross of the Order who was also the Secretary of the Treasury, was imprisoned in Fort St. Angelo after he addressed a letter to Hompesch stating that he would not fight the French and asking to remain neutral in the conflict. Some pressured Hompesch to negotiate with Napoleon and come to terms of peace, and Maltese representatives petitioned the Grand Master to reach an armistice.

Meanwhile, the fortifications of the harbour area continued to resist the invasion. Fort Ricasoli and Fort Manoel withstood a number of attacks and they only surrendered after the Order's capitulation had been signed. The French blockaded Fort Tigné and bombarded it repeatedly on 11 and 12 June, and its defenders were unaware of the negotiations that were taking place at the time. The defending garrison abandoned Tigné on the night of 12–13 June, and the French took control soon afterwards.

=== 11–12 June: Negotiations and capitulation ===
The Council eventually decided to ask for a truce. The Monsieur de Fremaux, the consul of the Batavian Republic, was initially chosen to bear a letter to the French asking for a truce. Due to Fremaux' old age, Monsieur Mélan, a member of his staff, was sent instead, and he arrived on the French flagship L'Orient at 09.00 on 11 June. Mélan returned with a verbal message that Napoleon would send an envoy, and around 12.00 General Junot arrived with a small delegation. He was joined by a number of knights of the Order who were sympathetic to the French, including Ransijat who had been freed following his brief imprisonment.

Hompesch and members of the State Congregation received the envoys, and they agreed on a 24-hour ceasefire during which negotiations would continue on board L'Orient. On 12 June, Napoleon and representatives of the Order and the Maltese signed a convention in which the Order capitulated Valletta and the Maltese Islands' fortifications and ceded sovereignty of the islands to the French. The French promised to acquire a principality for the Grand Master as compensation for the loss of Malta. They promised to respect the private property of individual knights and the Maltese. Pensions were also granted to the Grand Master and the French knights, and a promise to secure similar pensions for knights from the Cisalpine, Roman, Ligurian and Helvetic Republics was also made.

The agreement stated that Fort Manoel, Fort Tigné, Fort St. Angelo, the fortifications of Birgu and Senglea, the Santa Margherita Lines and the Cottonera Lines were to be surrendered to the French by 12.00 of 12 June. The fortifications of Valletta, the Floriana Lines, Fort Saint Elmo, Fort Ricasoli and the remaining fortifications were to be surrendered by 12.00 of the following day. The Order's navy was to be transferred to a French officer by 12 June. By 12–13 June, the French had taken control of the entire island and its fortifications. They also captured approximately 1200 artillery pieces, 40000 muskets, 1,500,000 pounds (680,000 kg) of gunpowder, two ships of the line, a frigate and four galleys of the Order.

== Aftermath ==
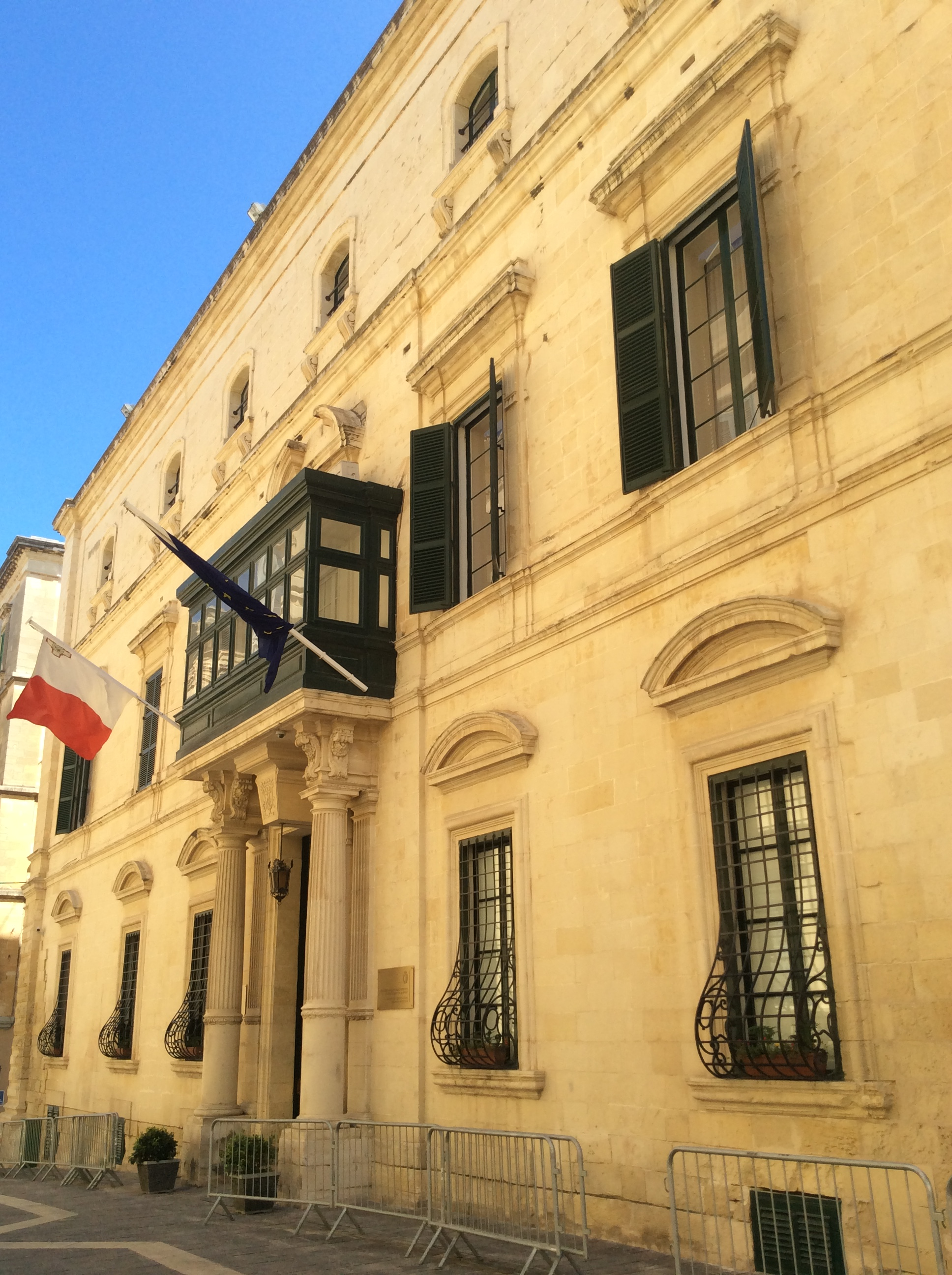
Palazzo Parisio in Valletta, where Napoleon stayed for a couple of days after the invasion

Following the capture of Malta, Napoleon landed at Valletta on 13 June. He stayed on the island for six days, spending the first night at the Banca Giuratale and later staying at Palazzo Parisio, before most of the French fleet embarked for the campaign in Egypt. General Vaubois remained on the island with a garrison in order to maintain control, thereby establishing the French occupation of Malta. During his short stay, Napoleon dictated instructions which radically reformed the Maltese government and society, so as to bring it in line with French Republican ideals.

A few days after the capitulation, the Grand Master and many knights left the island, taking with them few movable possessions including some relics and icons. The Order received shelter from Paul I of Russia, who was eventually proclaimed Grand Master by some knights. The Order gradually evolved into the Sovereign Military Order of Malta, which still exists today and has sovereignty but no territory.

Most of the Maltese were initially glad at the expulsion of the Order and were sympathetic to the French, but this opinion changed after the French refused to pay the Order's debts, introduced new taxes, refused to pay pensions, introduced laws restricting the privileges of the Church and began to loot churches. Within three months, the Maltese rose up against the occupiers, and took control of most of the islands, with British, Neapolitan and Portuguese assistance. The French garrison in Valletta and the Cottonera withstood the ensuing blockade for two years, before Vaubois surrendered to the British in 1800, making Malta a protectorate and initiating 164 years of British rule.
