= Fort Manoel =

Star fort in Gzira, Malta

- Forti Manoel
- Manoel Island, Gżira, Malta (Note: Lembi Battery, an outwork of Fort Manoel, was located on the Tigné peninsula in Sliema.)
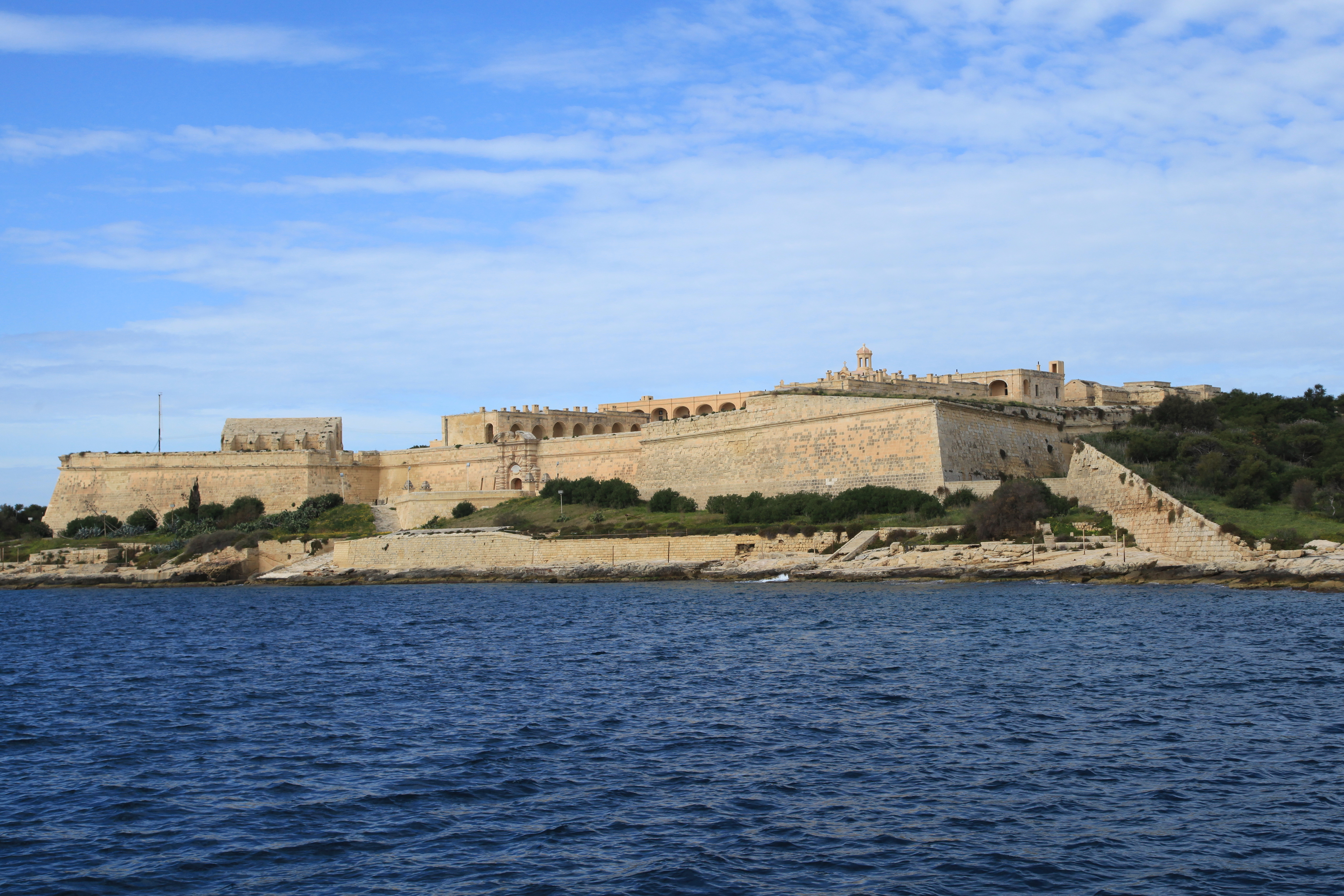
- View of Fort Manoel from the sea

Site information
- Type: Star fort
- Owner: Government of Malta
- Controlled by: MIDI plc
- Open to the public: Yes
- Condition: Intact

Location
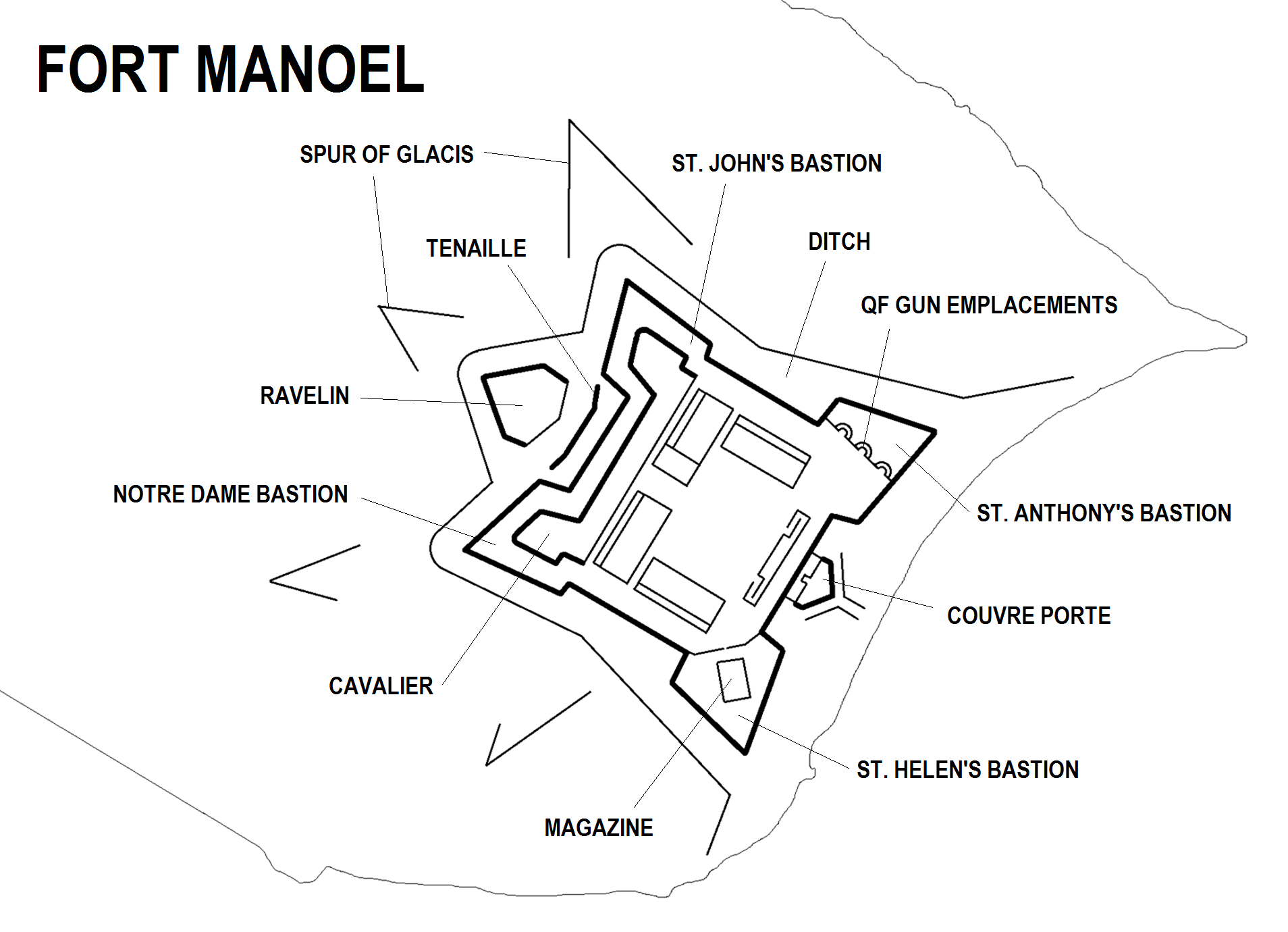
- Map of Fort Manoel
- Coordinates: 35°54′11″N 14°30′19″E

Site history
- Built: 1723–1733 (Note: Some finishing touches were made throughout the course of the 18th century, until at least 1792. Some changes were also made by the British military in the late 19th and early 20th centuries.)
- Built by: Order of Saint John
- In use: c. 1734–1964
- Materials: Limestone
- Battles/wars: French invasion of Malta (1798); Siege of Malta (1798–1800); World War II

Fort Manoel (Maltese: Forti Manoel or Fortizza Manoel) is a star fort on Manoel Island in Gżira, Malta. It was built in the 18th century by the Knights Hospitaller, during the reign of Grand Master António Manoel de Vilhena, after whom it is named. Fort Manoel is located to the north west of Valletta, and commands Marsamxett Harbour and the anchorage of Sliema Creek. The fort is an example of Baroque architecture, and was designed with both functionality and aesthetics in mind.

After a brief French occupation which began in 1798, the British military took over the fort in 1800, and it remained in their use until 1964. The fort was severely damaged in World War II, but it was restored in the early 21st century and is now in good condition.

Fort Manoel has been on Malta's tentative list of UNESCO World Heritage Sites since 1998, as part of the Knights' Fortifications around the Harbours of Malta.

== History ==
=== Background and failed proposals ===
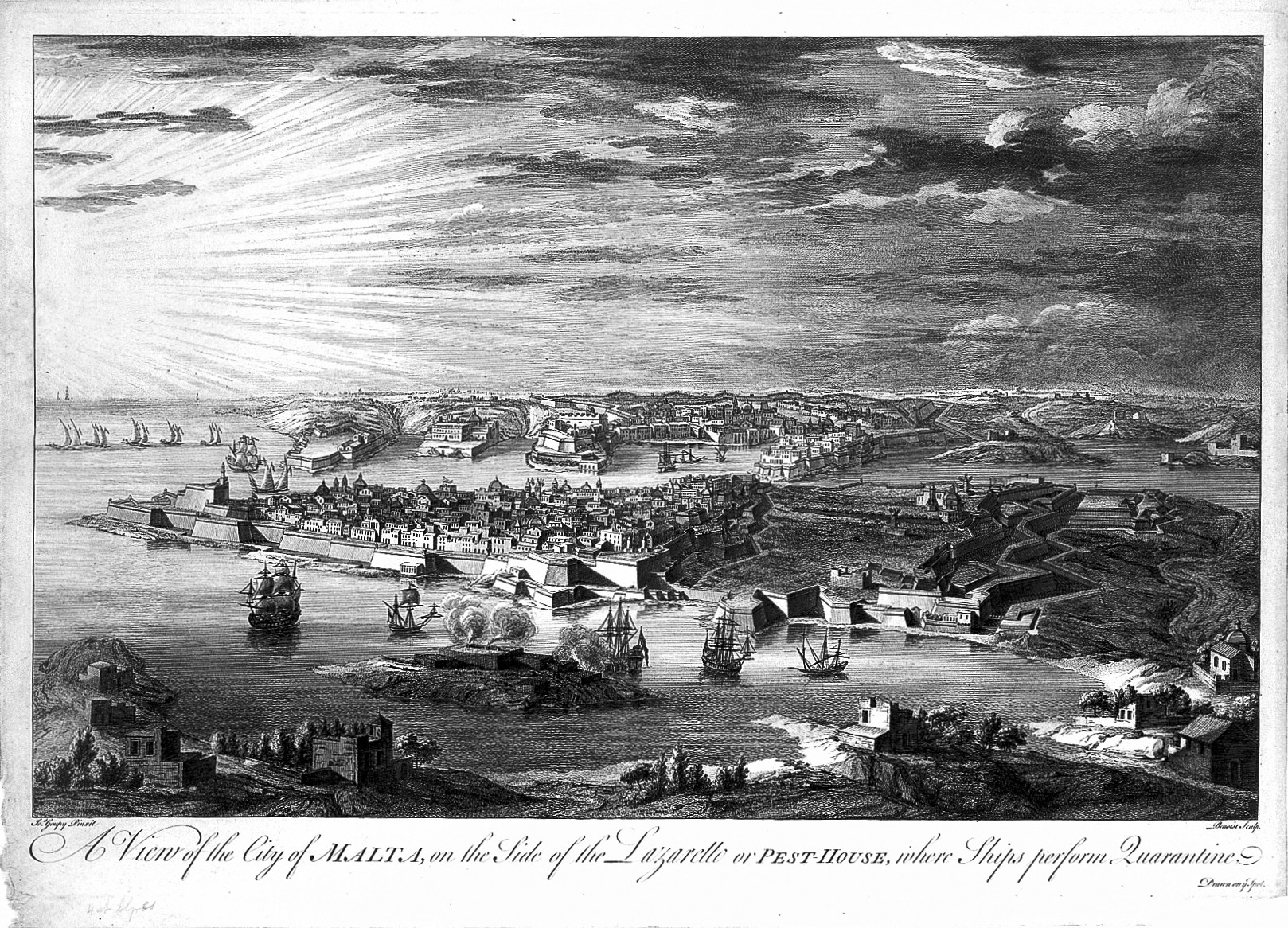
Etching showing Marsamxett Harbour in the 1720s, just before the construction of Fort Manoel. The Isolotto (Manoel Island) is the island in the foreground, in the middle of the harbour.

In the 16th century, the Marsamxett Harbour was one of the two major harbours in the Maltese city of Valletta. In the centre of the harbour was an island, originally known as l'Isolotto and now known as Manoel Island after the fort, which overlooked the city.

Shortly after Valletta's construction, the Order of Saint John realised this was a potential vulnerability in the city's defences. As early as 1569, it was proposed that a small fort with a cavalier be built on the Isolotto to prevent the enemy from taking the island and building batteries on it. This proposal was presented by Francesco Collignon.

The threat was again highlighted by the Spanish military engineer Scipione Campi in 1577, and by Giovanni Battista in 1582.

The next proposal to build a fortification on the island was made by the Italian military engineer Antonio Maurizio Valperga in 1670. He proposed a roughly hexagonal fort with a hornwork, in the Dutch style of fortification. The proposal was criticized by the Order's engineers, and a third proposal was drawn up by the Flemish military engineer Carlos de Grunenbergh in 1687. Grunenburgh's proposal consisted of a fort with four bastions and a ravelin, surrounded by a ditch, covertway and faussebraye.

Other proposals were made in 1715, this time by the knight René Jacob de Tigné and a team of French engineers. There were several different plans, including building a coastal battery and a redoubt. Other plans included building a four-bastioned fort, or combining all three (fort, battery and redoubt) for the defence of the island.

=== Construction ===
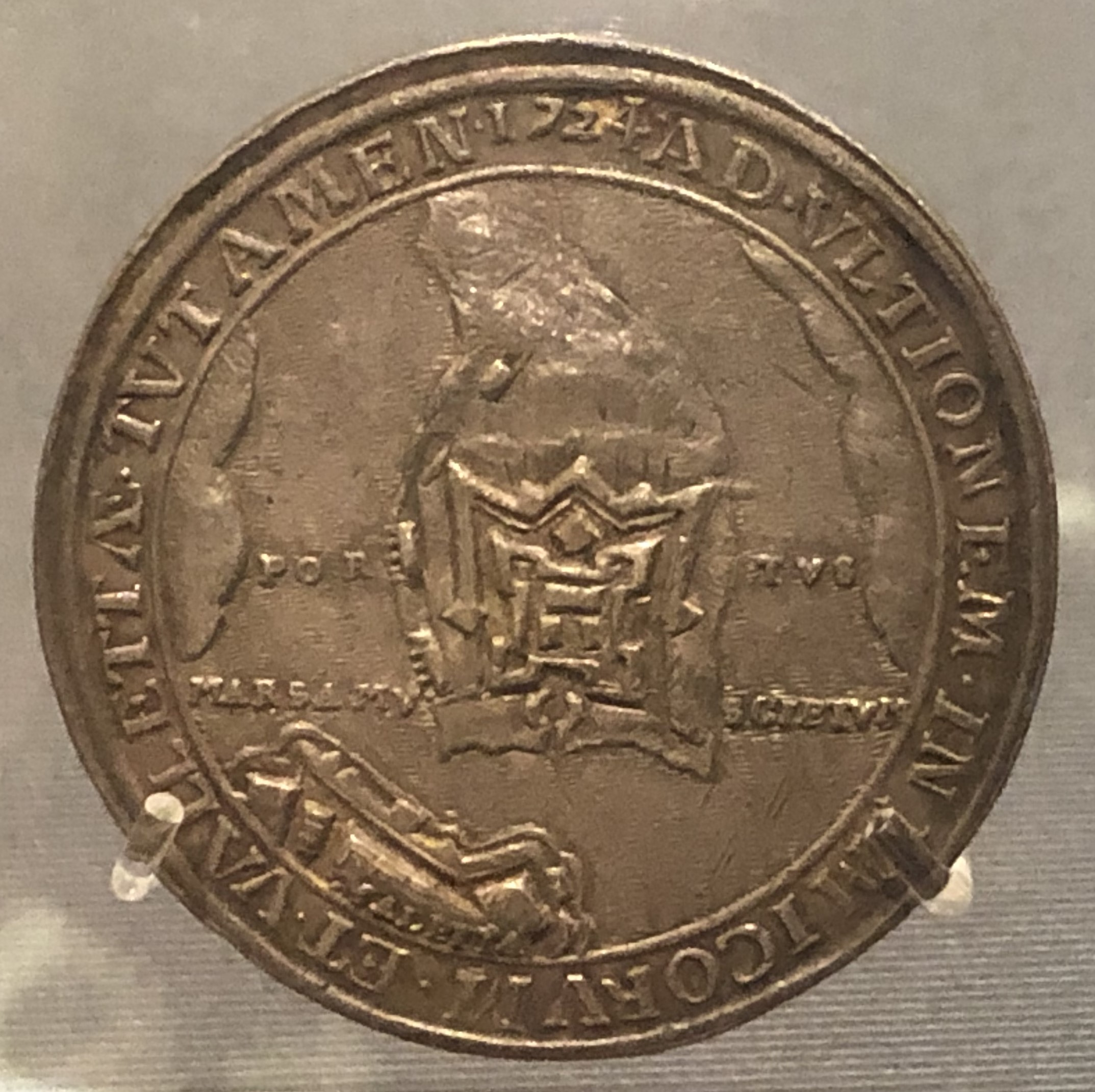
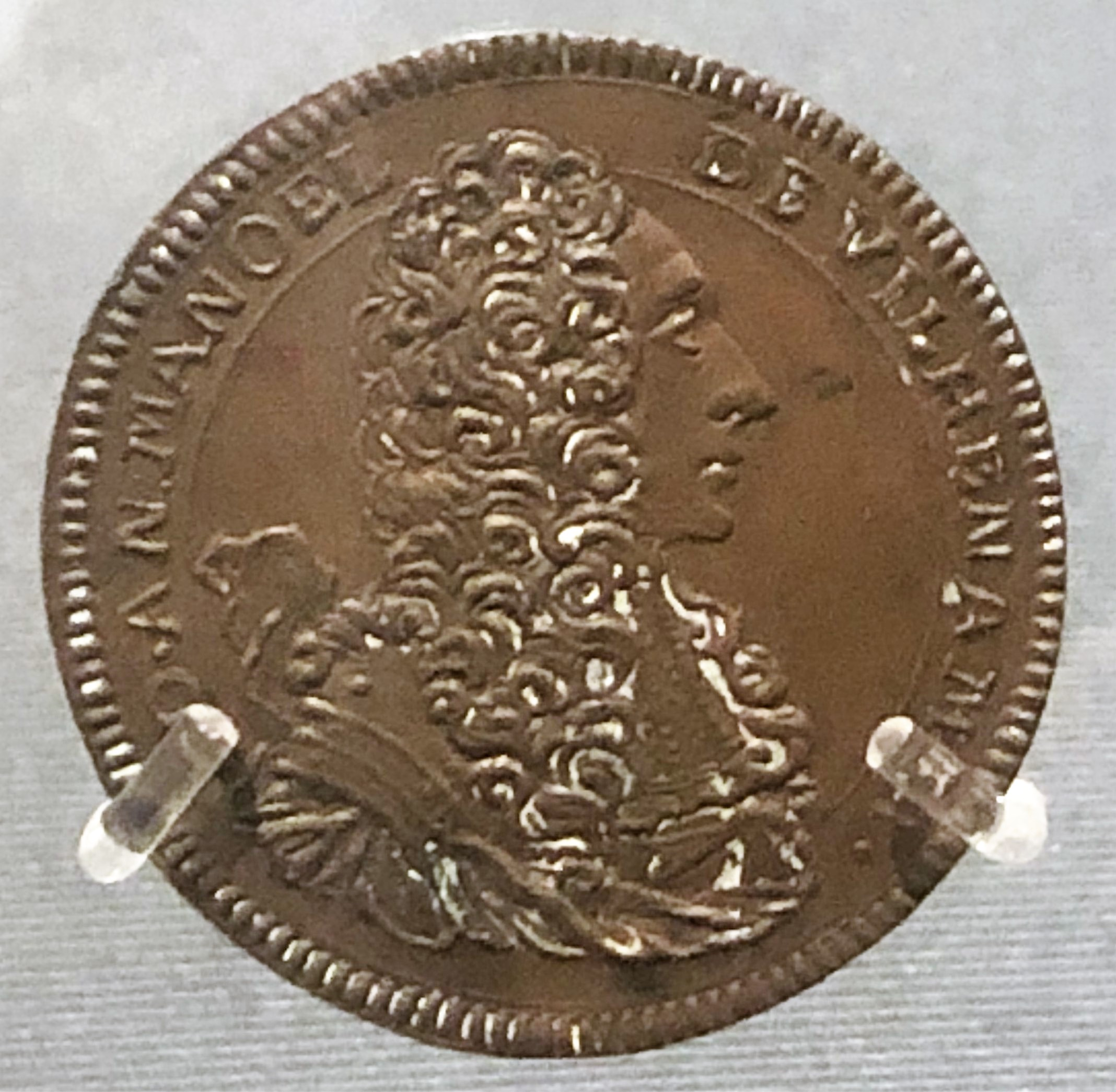
Medal commemorating the construction of Fort Manoel, cast by Pietro Paolo Troisi in 1724
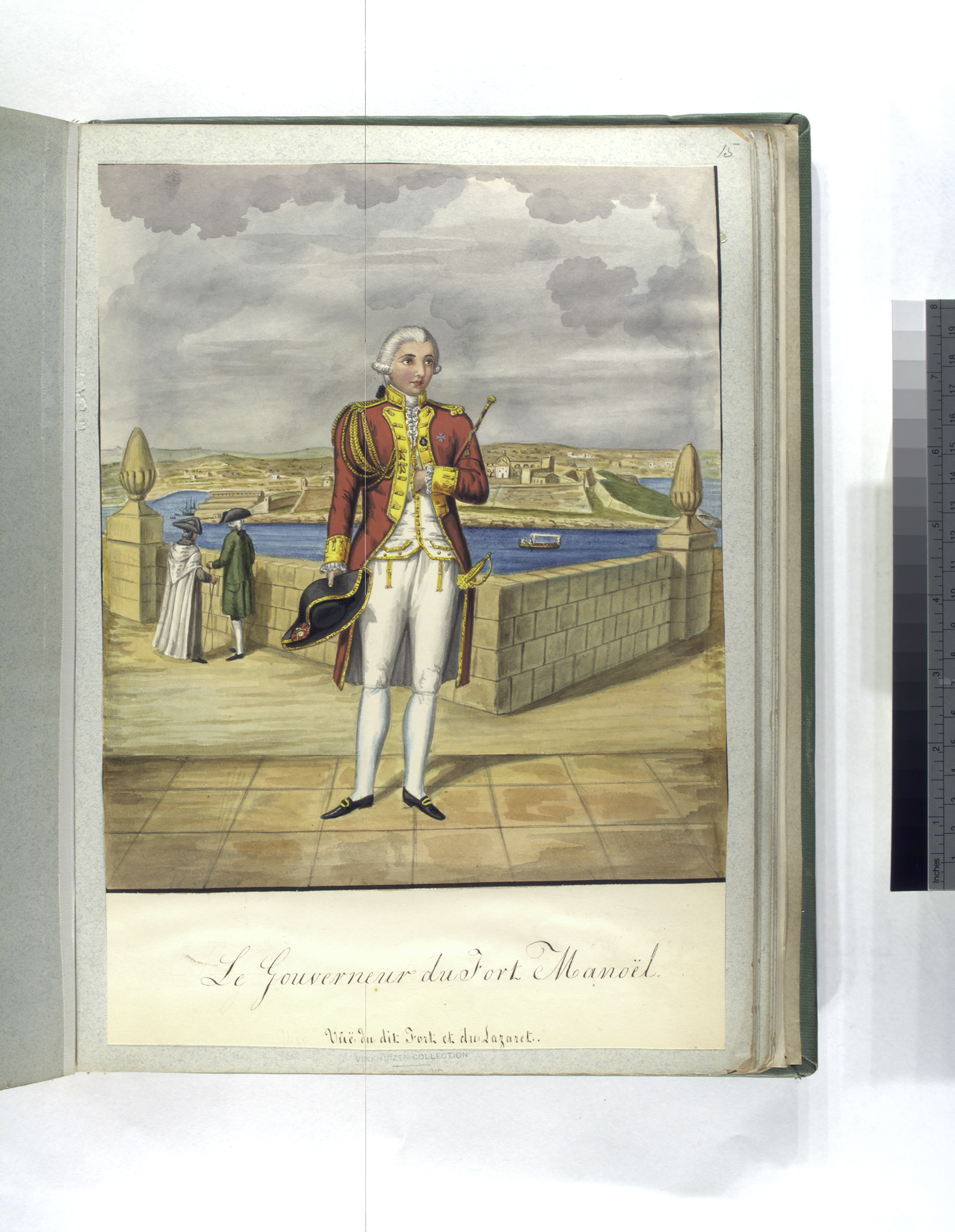
18th century painting of the Hospitaller Governor of Fort Manoel, with the fort itself in the background

Eventually, the final design was agreed in 1723, and it incorporated the work of de Tigné as well as Charles François de Mondion, the Order's military engineer. The new fort was to be square in shape, with four bastions and two cavaliers. The fort was financed by, and named after, the Portuguese Grand Master, António Manoel de Vilhena. He also set up the Manoel Foundation, a fund responsible for the maintenance and garrison of Fort Manoel and its outworks.

The first stone was laid by de Vilhena on 14 September 1723, and work progressed rapidly. By 1727, the enceinte, cavaliers and gateway were complete. The ditch had been excavated by 1732, while the chapel, barracks, magazines and countermines were completed in around 1733. The fort was an active military establishment by 1734. When Mondion died in 1733, he was buried in the crypt under the fort's chapel.

In 1757, Lembi Battery was added near Tigné Point, Sliema. The battery was funded by the Manoel Foundation and it was considered to be an outwork of Fort Manoel, since it was intended to prevent an enemy from bombarding the fort's northern flank. It was decommissioned following the construction of Fort Tigné in 1795. The construction of the latter fort was also partially funded by the Manoel Foundation.

By 1761, Fort Manoel was considered to be as one of the best completed fortifications, and Comte de Bourlamaque has commented that the fort is a "modèle de fortification fait avec soin."

=== French occupation ===
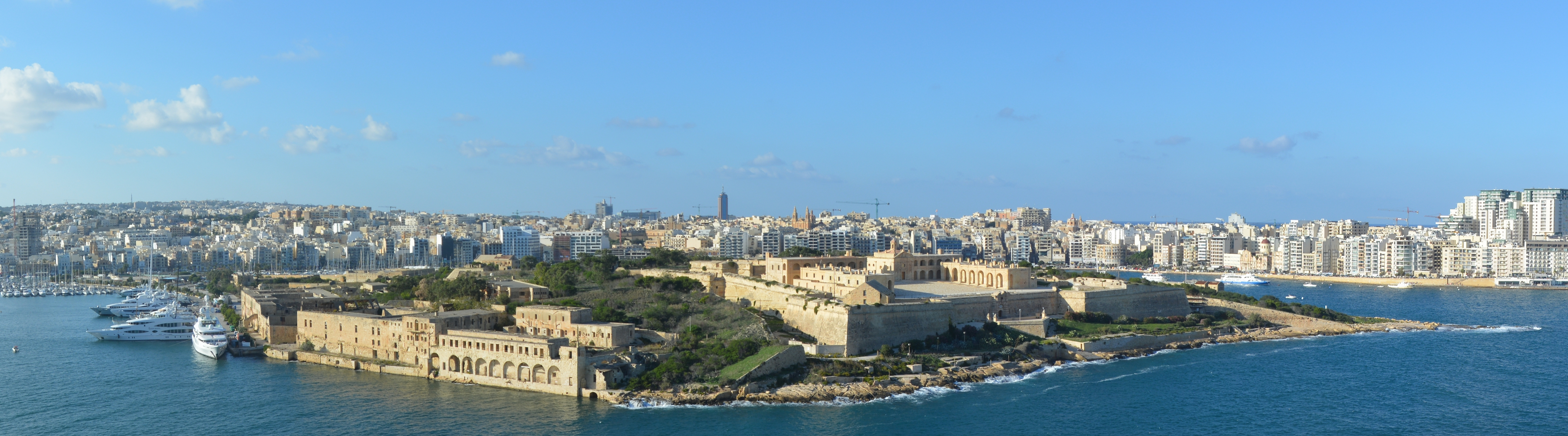
Fort Manoel seen from St. Michael's Bastion in Valletta

The fort first saw use during the French invasion of Malta in June 1798, in the French Revolutionary Wars. At the time, it was commanded by the Portuguese knight Gourgeau, and it was garrisoned by the Cacciatori, who were a volunteer chasseur light infantry regiment, as well as a few men from the Birchircara militia. The fort surrendered after Grand Master Hompesch officially capitulated to Napoleon.

A French garrison of a few hundred men took over the fort on 12 June. During the subsequent Maltese uprising and insurrection against the French, Maltese insurgents built Għargħar and Sqaq Cappara batteries to bombard Fort Manoel. The Maltese attacked the fort on a number of occasions, and the French retaliated with their own bombardment at least once. On 12 September 1799, a company of French troops from Fort Manoel attempted to silence an insurgent gun position in San Ġwann, but were repelled by the Maltese insurgents.

=== British rule ===
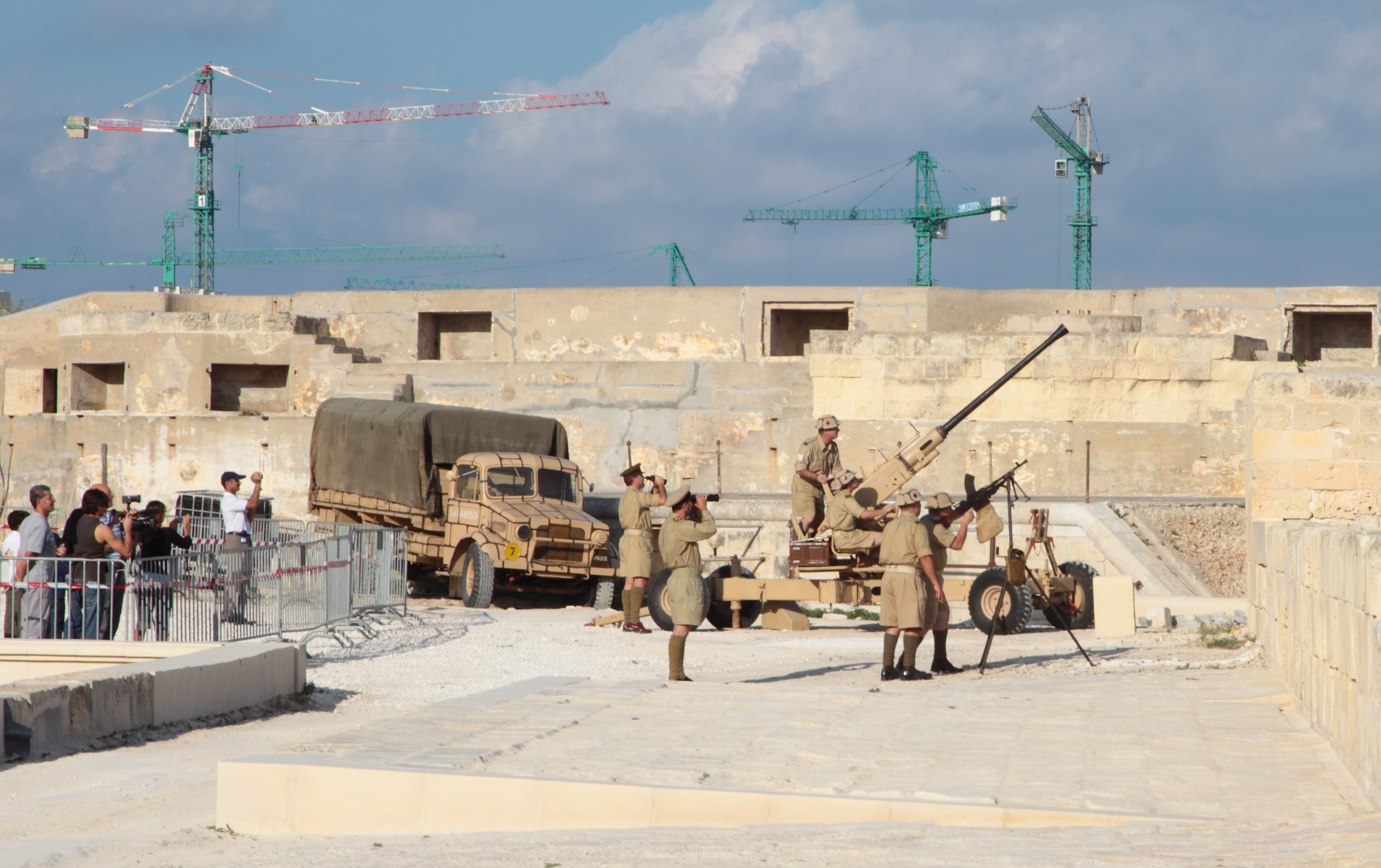
World War II reenactment at Fort Manoel

When Malta became a British protectorate in 1800, Fort Manoel was officially taken over by the British military that September. The piazza of Fort Manoel was the subject of the earliest known photographs of Malta, which were taken in 1840 by Horace Vernet while he was quarantined at the Lazzaretto, but are now believed to be lost. In the late 19th century, the echaugettes on the bastions facing Valletta were dismantled to make way for gun emplacements. Later on, significant alterations were made to St. Anthony Bastion, when its gunpowder magazine was demolished to make way for a battery of three QF 12-pounder guns.

The British military finally decommissioned the fort's guns in 1906, although it remained a military establishment. In 1922, some refugees from the Burning of Smyrna were housed at the fort. It was included on the Antiquities List of 1925. The fort saw use again during World War II, when a battery of 3.7-inch heavy anti-aircraft guns was deployed there. The guns were mounted in concrete gun emplacements and deployed in a semicircle in and around the fort. The fort suffered considerable damage to its ramparts, barracks and chapel as a result of aerial bombing during the war.

From 1957 to 1961 three Commanders-in-Chief of the British Mediterranean Fleet (Lambe; Bingley; Holland-Martin) flew their flags from HMS Phoenicia, the Royal Navy name for its base in the fort.

The fort was eventually decommissioned in 1964.

=== Recent history ===
After being decommissioned, Fort Manoel was abandoned and fell into a state of disrepair. Parts of it were also vandalized. In 1970, the Royal Malta Yacht Club acquired part of the fort as its club house, and the yacht club remained there until it acquired new premises in Ta' Xbiex in 2008.

In August 2001, the development company MIDI plc began restoration work on the fort. Phase One of the project, which included the restoration of the piazza and the reconstruction of the ruined chapel, was completed in 2009. The second phase, including the restoration of the outer fortifications and glacis, was approved by the Malta Environment and Planning Authority in 2012. The restoration of Fort Manoel together with that of the nearby Fort Tigné cost a total of €30 million.

== Layout ==
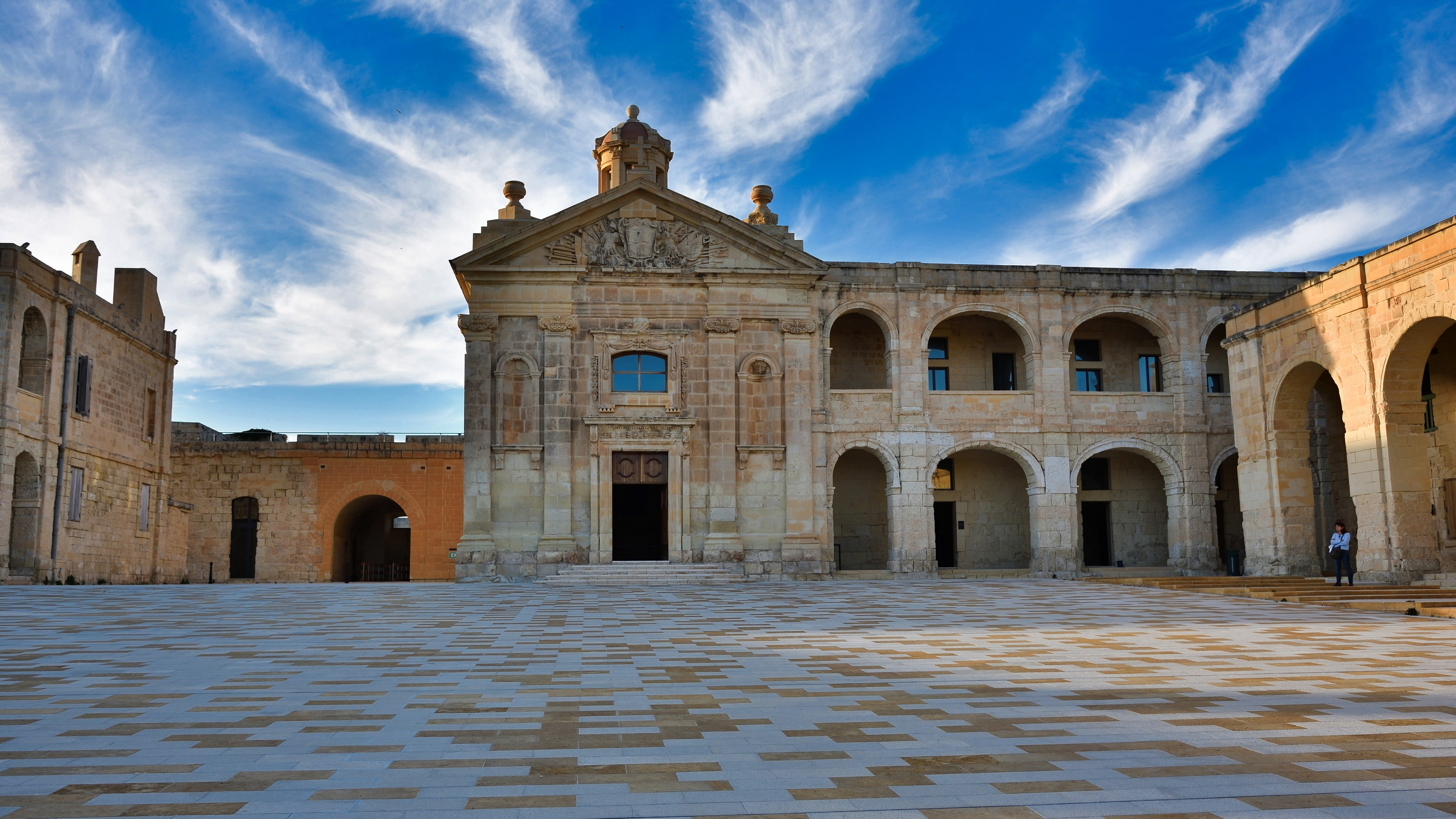
The piazza and chapel of Fort Manoel after restoration

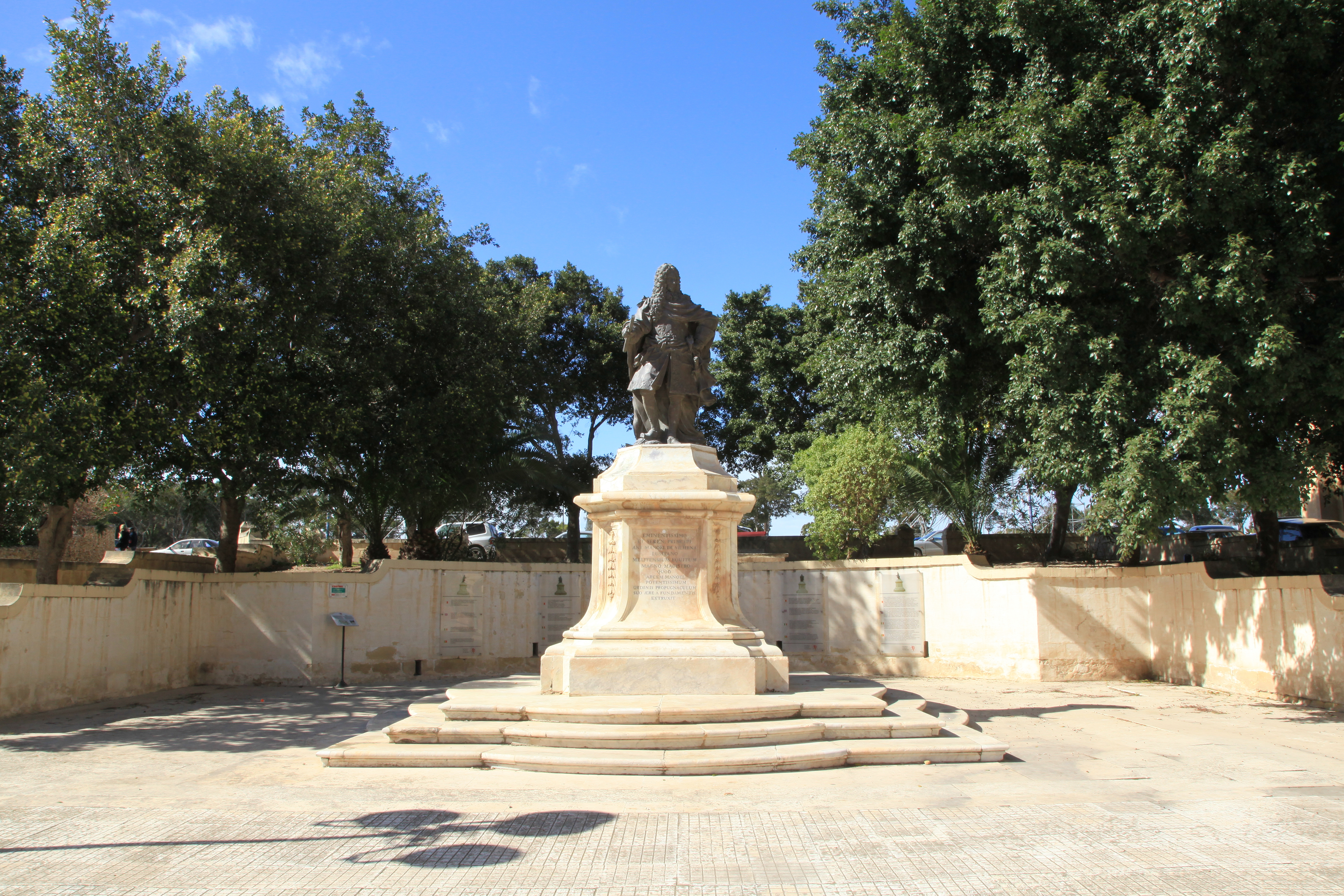
Monument to Grand Master de Vilhena that was formerly located at Fort Manoel. It is now located at Misraħ Papa Gwanni XXIII in Floriana.

Fort Manoel is built in the shape of a square, with a pentagonal bastion on each corner, giving it the shape of a star fort. The four bastions are called St. Helen, St. Anthony, St. John and Notre Dame Bastions.

St. Helen and St. Anthony Bastions are located on the seaward side, facing Valletta. They originally had echaugettes and gunpowder magazines, but the echaugettes on both bastions were dismantled in the 19th century, and the magazine on St. Anthony Bastion was demolished to make way for three QF 12-pounder gun emplacements. The magazine on St. Helen Bastion is still intact. The curtain wall linking these two bastions contains the main gate, which is protected by a lunette known as the Couvre Porte.

St. John and Notre Dame Bastions are located along the landward side of the fort. Each bastion is protected by a low cavalier. The curtain wall between the two bastions is further protected by a pentagonal ravelin, which is largely rock hewn.

A piazza is located inside the fort, and it contains the rebuilt Chapel of St Anthony of Padua, several barrack blocks, an armoury and other buildings. A bronze statue of Grand Master Vilhena, possibly designed by Pietro Paolo Troisi, once stood in the square but it was removed in the 19th century and relocated to Valletta. It was later relocated again and is now in Floriana.

== Ghost story ==
The fort is supposedly haunted by the Black Knight, who wears the armour and regalia of the Order of St. John, and resembles Grand Master de Vilhena. In the 1940s, the knight began to appear out of thin air near the ruins of the Chapel of St Anthony of Padua, which had just been bombed in World War II. The apparition was reportedly seen by Maltese and English men within the fort. When the rubble from the ruined chapel began to be cleared, the workmen reported that the knight was supervising their work. When the crypt beneath the chapel was opened, it was found that it had been vandalized, and the remains of knights which had been buried there were scattered around. After the crypt was restored and the bones were reburied, the Black Knight stopped appearing. In 1980, the crypt was vandalized for a second time, and the Black Knight reportedly began to appear again.

== In popular culture ==
- Fort Manoel is featured in the 2007 fiction book Il-Misteru tal-Forti Manoel (The Mystery of Fort Manoel) by Charles Zarb.
- The fort served as a location for the shooting of the climactic scene of Baelor, the ninth episode of the TV series Game of Thrones, in 2011.
- The fort hosted a Pit Stop during the eighth episode of The Amazing Race 25.
- The fort was also used in the filming of the 2016 films Risen and Assassin's Creed.
- The fort is also visible in the 2016 film 13 Hours: The Secret Soldiers of Benghazi.
- Transfer of the Island from the church to Lascaris and early buildings. Manoel and de Rohan period.
