= Antoine Étienne de Tousard =

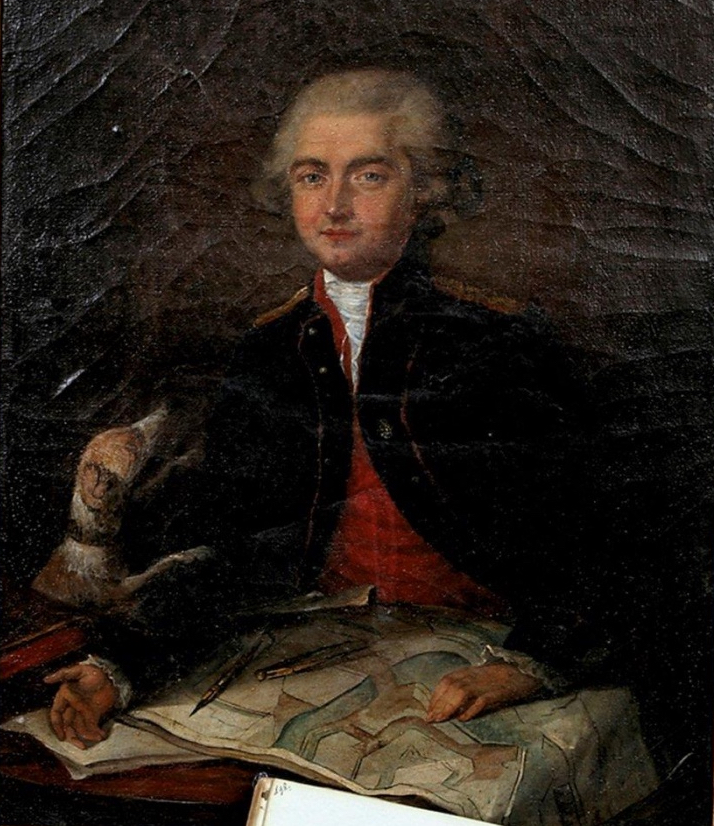
- Born: 9 December 1752; Paris, Kingdom of France
- Died: 15 September 1813 (aged 60); Hamburg, Bouches-de-l'Elbe, French Empire (modern Germany)
- Military career
- Allegiance: France
- Service years: 1770–1813
- Rank: Brigadier general
- Conflicts: French Revolutionary Wars; Napoleonic Wars
- Awards: Baron of the Empire; Legion of Honour

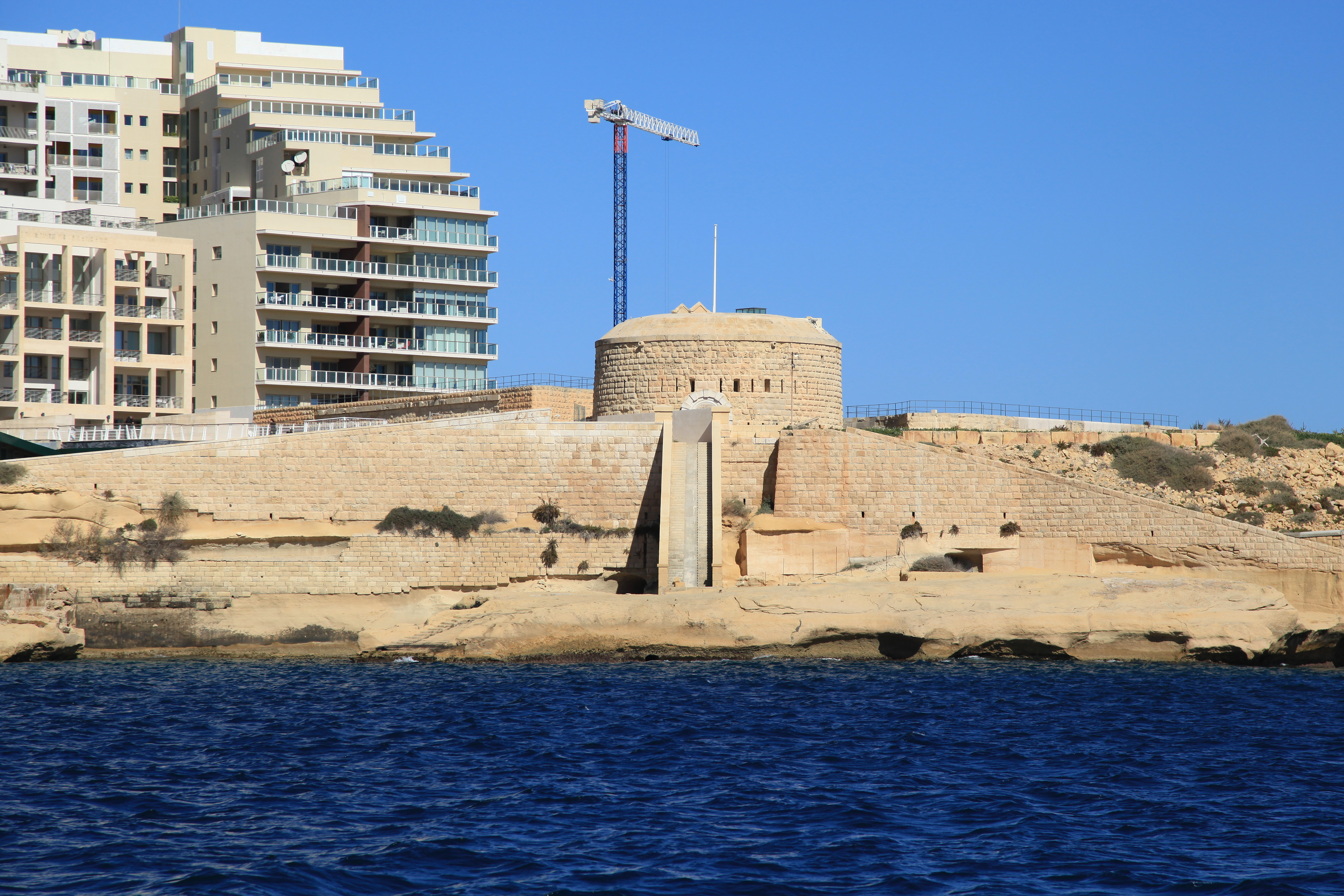
Fort Tigné in Sliema, Malta, which was designed by Tousard.

Antoine Étienne de Tousard (9 December 1752 – 15 September 1813) was a French general and military engineer during the French Revolutionary and Napoleonic Wars. He was also the last military engineer of the Order of Saint John. He is the brother of Louis de Tousard.

== Biography ==
Tousard was educated at the Royal Engineering School of Mézières. In 1770 he became a lieutenant, and was promoted to captain fourteen years later in 1784.

In 1792, he was sent to Malta, which was ruled by the Order of Saint John. During his stay in Malta, he made several alterations to Fort Ricasoli, converted St. Lucian Tower and Battery into Fort Rohan, and designed Fort Tigné. Grand Master Emmanuel de Rohan-Polduc promoted Tousard from servant-at-arms to Knight of Grace, and later Knight of Justice.

After the French occupation of Malta in 1798, Tousard left with Napoleon to the Egyptian campaign. After the capture of Alexandria, he was appointed deputy director of the fortifications, and was wounded during the Battle of Aboukir Bay on 2 August 1798.

In 1799, he took part in the expedition into Syria, and was responsible for various works in Gaza and Arish. He was appointed Chef de Brigade on 5 February 1801 by General Menou. This rank was confirmed in France on 7 February 1802. On 11 December of the same year, he became director of fortifications.

In 1803, he joined the Armée d'Angleterre for the planned invasion of England. He became a Knight of the Legion of Honour on 11 December 1803, and became an Officer on 14 June 1804. From 1803 to 1805 he was deployed as an engineer at Bruges, Ostend and Ambleteuse.

Tousard was assigned to the 3rd Corps of the Grande Armée on 30 August 1805. He was captured in Neuburg in October 1805.

In 1806 and 1807 he took part in the campaigns of Prussia and Poland, including the Battles of Jena, Eylau, Heilsberg and Friedland.

He was promoted to brigadier general on 5 July 1807, and was in control of the engineering of the 3rd Corps stationed in the Duchy of Warsaw between 1808 and 1809. He became Baron of the Empire on 16 September 1808. Tousard was seriously wounded on 3 June 1809 while repairing a bridge in Linz.

On 3 August 1810, he became a member of the fortifications committee, and was responsible for an inspection tour of the fortifications in the 32nd military division. In January 1813, he assumed the same functions in the 31st and 32nd military divisions.

He was sent to Hamburg on 15 August 1813, and he died there on 15 September, at the age of 60.
