= Sliema Batteries =

- Batteriji ta' Tas-Sliema
- Part of the French blockade batteries
- Sliema, Malta

Site information
- Type: Artillery batteries

Location
- Coordinates: 35°54′39.1″N 14°30′19.3″E

Site history
- Built: c. 1798
- Built by: Maltese insurgents
- In use: c. 1798–1800
- Materials: Limestone
- Fate: Demolished
- Battles/wars: Siege of Malta (1798–1800)

Garrison information
- Past commanders: Vincenzo Borg

The Sliema Batteries (Maltese: Batteriji ta' Tas-Sliema) were a series of artillery batteries in Sliema, Malta, that were built by Maltese insurgents during the French blockade of 1798–1800. They were the first in a chain of batteries, redoubts and entrenchments encircling the French positions in Marsamxett and the Grand Harbour.

The batteries were built by Vincenzo Borg. The following batteries are known to have existed:

- Imrabat Battery: This was armed with two or four mortars. It had an underground casemate (similar to the one at Għargħar Battery, also built by Maltese insurgents during the French blockade) and a gun crew shelter. It was surrounded by extensive walls and had a bastion.
- Ischina Battery: This was a small battery equipped with an 18-pounder, and was situated in a field known as ta' Xini. It was possibly located at Fond Għadir, close to where Sliema Point Battery was later built. Vincenzo Borg often stood guard at this battery.
- Sqaq Kappara Battery: This battery overlooked and bombarded Fort Manoel.
- Six walled positions along present day Main Street, including two batteries at Għar il-Lembi, armed with two and three guns.

Other batteries known as tal-Blat and ta' Sbiese also existed.

The Sliema batteries still existed in 1811, but like the other French blockade fortifications, they were dismantled, possibly sometime after 1814. No traces of the batteries can be seen today.
