= Varga (surname) =

Varga or Vargha is a Hungarian occupational surname derived from the Hungarian term varga, meaning, “shoemaker” or “cobbler”. The Czech and Slovak female form is Vargová.

People with the surname “Varga” include:

== Academics ==
- Eugen Varga (Hungarian: Varga Jenő; 1879–1964), Hungarian Marxist economist
- Richard S. Varga (1928–2022), American mathematician

== Artists ==
- Judit Varga (born 1979), Hungarian composer
- Laszlo Varga (cellist), Hungarian-American cellist (retired 2000)
- Marián Varga (1947–2017), Slovak musician and composer
- Margit Varga (1908–2005), American painter, art director, journalist
- Ferenc Varga (sculptor)
- Frank Varga
- Silvia Vargová (Hungarian: Varga Szilvia)

== Sportspeople ==
- Ádám Varga (born 1999), Hungarian footballer
- Attila Varga (born 1969), Hungarian footballer
- Barnabás Varga (born 1994), Hungarian footballer
- Béla Varga (wrestler) (1888–1969), Hungarian Olympic wrestler
- Dacian Varga (born 1984), Romanian footballer
- Dániel Varga (born 1983), Hungarian water polo player
- Dénes Varga (born 1987), Hungarian water polo player
- Dezső Varga (born 1939), Romanian ice hockey player
- Erik Varga (born 1976), Slovak sports shooter
- Ferenc Varga (1925–2023), Hungarian sprint canoeist
- Gabriel Varga (born 1985), Canadian kickboxer
- István Varga (born 1963), Hungarian footballer
- István Varga (1943–2014), Hungarian handball player
- István Varga (1960–2023), Hungarian judoka
- János Varga (1939–2022), Hungarian wrestler
- József Varga (born 1954), Hungarian footballer
- József Varga (born 1988), Hungarian footballer
- József Varga (born 1999), Hungarian footballer
- Judit Varga (born 1976), Hungarian athlete
- Katalin Varga (canoeist) (born 1986), Hungarian paracanoeist
- Kevin Varga, Hungarian footballer
- László Varga (footballer) (born 1987), Hungarian footballer
- Miklós Varga (born 1987), Hungarian boxer
- Milan Varga (born 1983), Slovak ice hockey player
- Miroslav Varga, Czech sport shooter
- Norbert Varga (born 1980), Romanian footballer
- Peter Varga (born 1998), Slovak footballer
- Péter Varga (born 1974), Hungarian kickboxer
- Roland Varga (athlete) (born 1967), Hungarian discus thrower
- Roland Varga (footballer) (born 1989), Hungarian footballer
- Saša Varga (born 1993), Belgian footballer
- Stanislav Varga (born 1972), Slovak footballer
- Tamás Varga (born 1975), Hungarian water polo player
- Zsolt Varga (born 1972), Hungarian water polo player who competed in the 1996 and 2000 Summer Olympics
- Zsolt Varga (canoeist), Hungarian sprint canoeist
- Zvonko Varga (born 1959), Serbian footballer

== Others ==
- Béla Varga (politician) (1903–1995), Hungarian Catholic priest and politician
- Gabor Varga (aviator) (1961–2006), Swedish aviator
- Ivan Varga (1953–2021), Slovak politician
- István Varga (born 1953), Hungarian lawyer and politician
- István Varga (born 1956), Hungarian politician and economist
- Judit Varga (born 1980), Hungarian lawyer and politician
- Karissa Varga, American politician
- Katalin Varga (1802–1852), leader of the Transylvanian Miners' Movement
- Lőrinc Varga, Hungarian politician
- Melinda Varga (born 1977), Australian reality TV personality
- Michel Varga (1927–2015), Hungarian Trotskyist activist
- Nacho Varga, a fictional character in Better Call Saul
- V.M. Varga, the main antagonist in the third season of Fargo
- Zoltán Varga (disambiguation), several people

== Vargha ==
- András Vargha, Hungarian psychologist and statistician
- Csongor Vargha (born 1946), Hungarian sprint canoeist
- Faraneh Vargha-Khadem, British cognitive neuroscientist
- Ferenc Vargha, Hungarian jurist
- Ilona Vargha (1910–1973), Hungarian fencer
- János Vargha (born 1949), Hungarian biologist and environmentalist
- Tamás Vargha, Hungarian politician

== See also ==
- Warga (surname)
