= Zoltán =

Zoltán (Hungarian pronunciation: [ˈzoltaːn]) is a Hungarian masculine given name. The name days for this name are 8 March and 23 June in Hungary, and 7 April in Slovakia. "Zoli" is the short version of Zoltán, and is commonly used.

Zoltána is the feminine version.

The name is derived from the Turkish word "sultan" which comes from Arabic "سلطان".

== Notable people ==
- Zoltán of Hungary (c. 907 – c. 950)
- Zoltan Bathory (born 1978), guitarist of heavy metal band Five Finger Death Punch
- Zoltán Lajos Bay (1900–1992), Hungarian physicist
- Zoltán Berczik (1937–2011), six times European Champion in table-tennis.
- Zoltán Czibor (1929–1997), Hungarian footballer
- Zoltán Czukor (born 1962), Hungarian athletics competitor
- Zoltán Dani (born 1956), Serbian Army officer
- Zoltán Gera (actor) (1923–2014), Hungarian actor
- Zoltán Gera (footballer) (born 1979), Fulham F.C. Hungarian association football player
- Zoltán Halmay (1881–1956), Hungarian Olympic swimmer
- Zoltán Horváth (disambiguation) – several people
- Zoltan Istvan (born 1973), American writer and futurist
- Zoltan Kaszas, American comedian
- Zoltán Kammerer (born 1978), Hungarian canoeist and local politician
- Zoltán Kocsis (1952–2016), pianist, conductor, and composer
- Zoltán Kodály (1882–1967), composer, creator of the Kodály-method.
- Zoltán Korda (1895–1961), Hungarian-born motion picture screenwriter, director and producer
- Zoltán Kovács (ice hockey) (born 1962), ice hockey coach and administrator, recipient of the Paul Loicq Award
- Zoltán Latinovits (1931–1976), Hungarian actor, director.
- Zoltán Magyar (born 1953), 2-time Olympic gold medalist in pommel horse gymnast. The Magyar spindle and the Magyar travel was named after him.
- Zoltán Meskó (1883–1959), Nazi politician.
- Zoltan Mesko (American football) (born 1986), American-football-player
- Zoltán Mujahid (born 1979), Hungarian singer
- Zoltan Pali (born 1960), American architect based in Los Angeles, California
- Zoltán Ozoray Schenker (1880–1966), Hungarian Olympic champion saber fencer
- Zoltán Sebescen (born 1975), Hungarian-German footballer and coach
- Zoltan Somogyi, creator of the Mercury programming language
- Zoltán Szabó (disambiguation), several people
- Zoltán Takács (musician) (born 1980), Hungarian musician and record producer
- Zoltán Takács (footballer) (born 1983), Hungarian footballer
- Zoltán Takács (toxinologist), Hungarian-born toxinologist and tropical adventurer
- Zoltan Teglas (born 1969), front man of the California-based band Ignite
- Zoltán Tildy (1889–1961), president of Hungary after World War II
- Zoltán Varga (disambiguation)
- Zoltán Zana (born 1966) aka Ganxsta Zolee, Hungarian musician.
- Zoltán is the Hungarian name for Mihai Viteazu village, Saschiz Commune, Mureș County, Romania, formerly called Zoltan in Romanian.

== Films ==
- Zoltan, Hound of Dracula, alternative title for Dracula's Dog, a 1978 American horror film starring Michael Pataki and José Ferrer

== Fictional characters ==
- Zoltan (Dude, Where's My Car?)
- Zoltan, a tomato character in the animated television series Attack of the Killer Tomatoes
- Zoltan, an alien race in the video game FTL: Faster Than Light
- Zoltan, the name of a pet raven in Stephen King's novel The Gunslinger
- Zoltan, a talking stuffed wolf character in the television series Young Dracula
- Zoltan Akkanen, the main antagonist in the 2018 anime film Mobile Suit Gundam Narrative
- Zoltan Amadeus, a supervillain from the Spider-Man and His Amazing Friends episode "Attack of the Arachnoid"
- Zoltan Grundy, a recurring character in the Disney Channel sitcom A.N.T. Farm
- Zoltan Karpathy, a main character in the My Fair Lady musical
- Zoltan Chivay, a recurring character from The Witcher novels and The Witcher (video game) series
- Zoltan Mahany, a recurring character in the Nero Wolfe novels by Rex Stout
- Zoltan, the main antagonist of The Evil of Frankenstein

== Other uses ==
- Zoltan (hand gesture), a hand sign originally used by characters in Dude, Where's My Car?, later used as a celebration by the Pittsburgh Pirates in Major League Baseball as well as by other athletes
- Zoltan, a Fortuneteller-machine.
- Zoltan is a village in Ghidfalău Commune, Covasna County, Romania
- Zoltak (surname)

== See also ==
- Zoltar (disambiguation)
