= Gábor Varga =

Gábor Varga may refer to:

- Gábor Varga (footballer)
- Gábor Varga (politician)
- Gabor Varga (aviator)
