= Zoltán Takács =

Zoltán Takács may refer to:

- Zoltán Takács (musician) (born 1980), Hungarian musician and record producer
- Zoltán Takács (footballer) (born 1983), Hungarian footballer
- Zoltán Takács (toxinologist), Hungarian-born toxinologist and tropical adventurer
