= Warga (surname) =

Warga is a surname. Notable people with the surname include:

- Andrew F. Warga (1919–1998), American politician
- David Warga (fl. 2002–2010), American poker player
- Jake Warga (born 1972), American radio journalist
- Jasmine Warga (born 1988), American author
- Mary Warga (1904–1991), American physicist
- Wayne Warga (1938–1994), American journalist and author

== See also ==
- Varga (surname)
