= Marsamxett Harbour =

Natural harbor in Malta

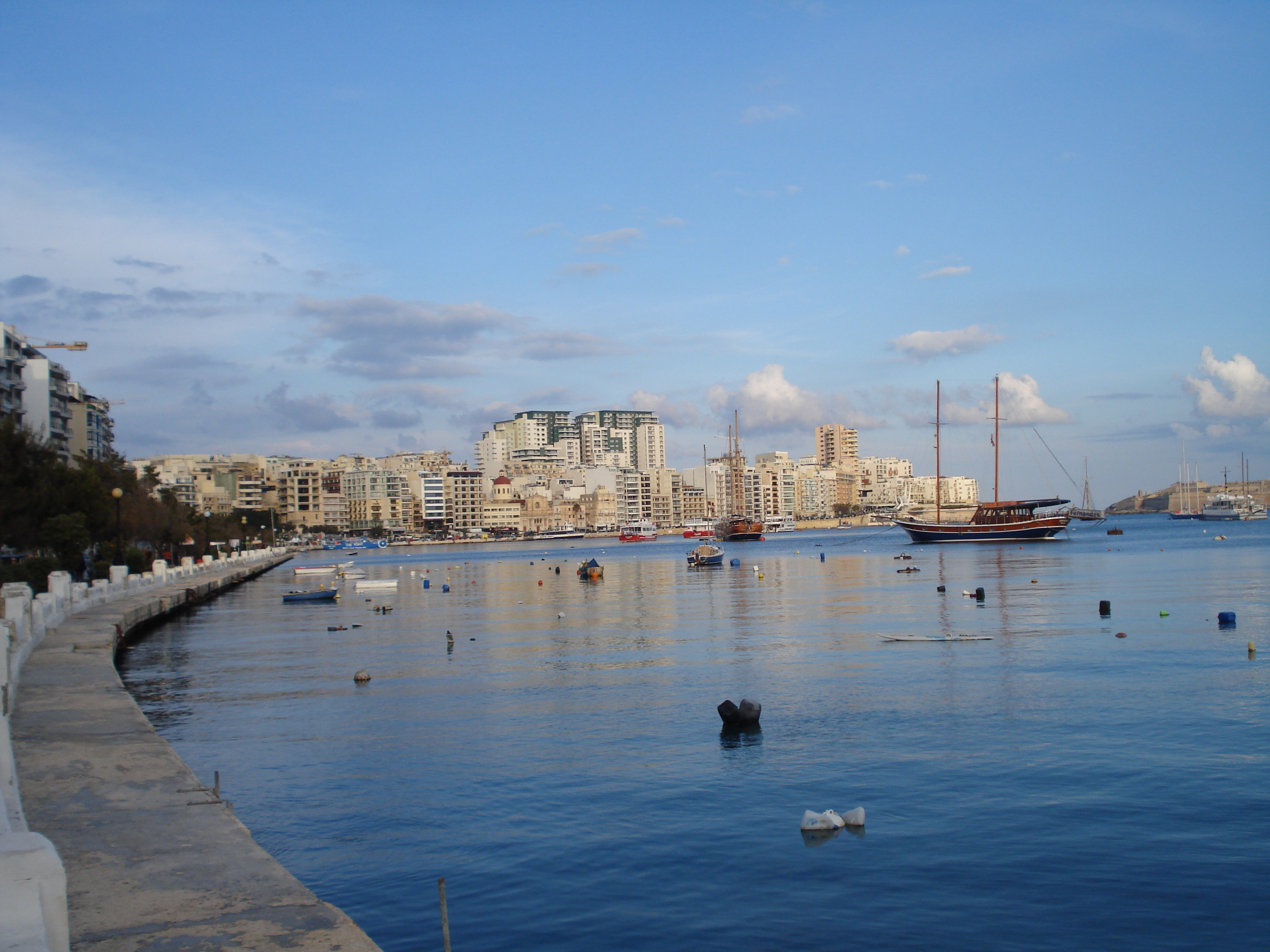
View of Marsamxett from Sliema

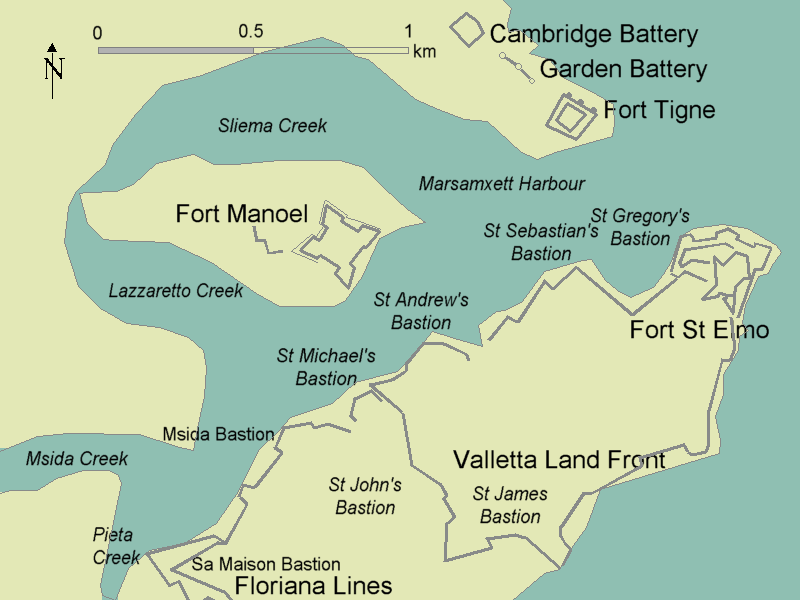
Map of Marsamxett

Marsamxett Harbour (Maltese pronunciation: [mɐr.sɐmˈʃɛt]), historically also referred to as Marsamuscetto, is a natural harbour on the island of Malta. It is located to the north of the larger Grand Harbour. The harbour is generally more dedicated to leisure use than the Grand Harbour.

== Description ==
The harbour mouth faces north east and is bounded to the north by Dragut Point and Tigné Point. Its northwest shore is made up of the towns of Sliema, Gżira and Ta' Xbiex. The harbour then extends inland to Pietà and Msida. Off Gżira lies Manoel Island, now connected to the mainland by a bridge. The south eastern shore of the harbour is formed by the Sciberras peninsula, which is largely covered by the town of Floriana and the city of Valletta. At its tip lies the 16th century Fort Saint Elmo. The Sciberras peninsula divides Marsamxett from the larger parallel natural harbour, Grand Harbour.

Along its partner the Grand Harbour, Marsamxett lies at the centre of gently rising ground. Development has grown up all around the twin harbours and up the slopes so that the whole bowl is effectively one large conurbation. Much of Malta's population lives within a three kilometer radius of Floriana. This is now one of the most densely populated areas in Europe. The harbours and the surrounding areas make up Malta's Northern and Southern Harbour Districts. Together, these districts contain 27 of 68 local councils. They have a population of 213,722 which make up over 47% of the total population of the Maltese islands.

== History ==
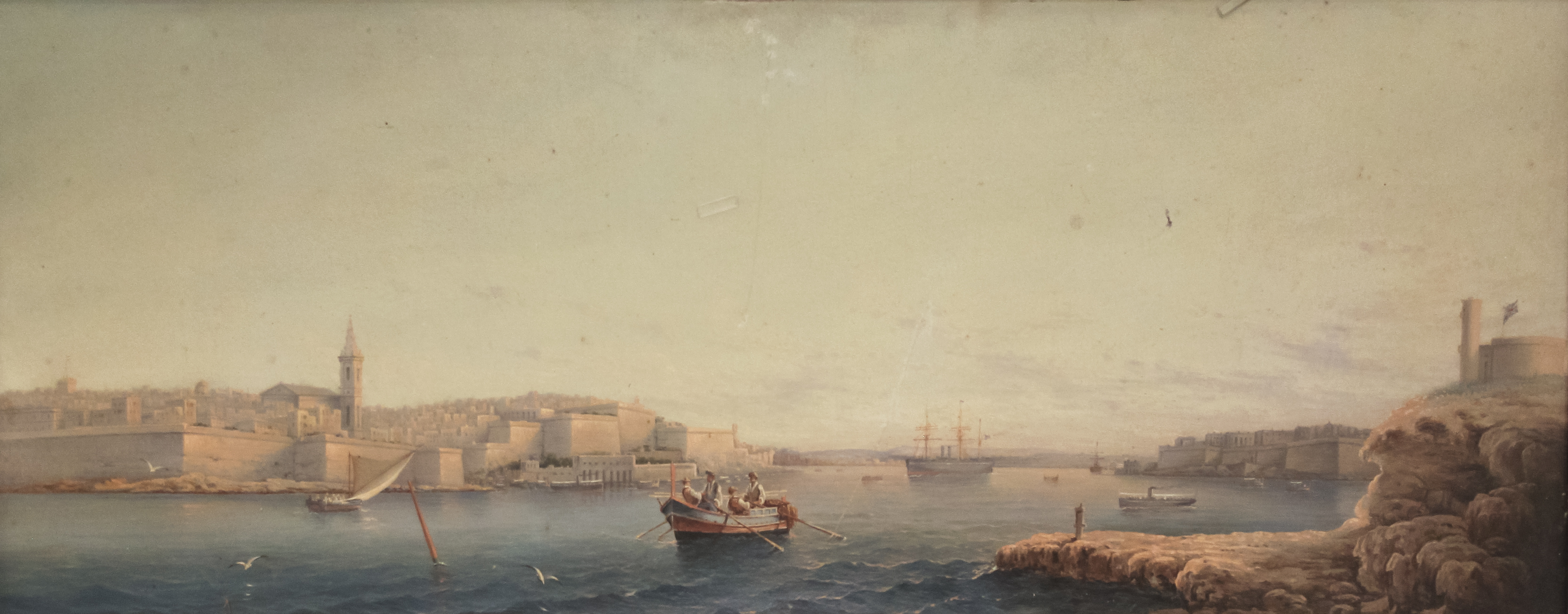
Marsamxett Harbour in the 19th century from a painting by Girolamo Gianni

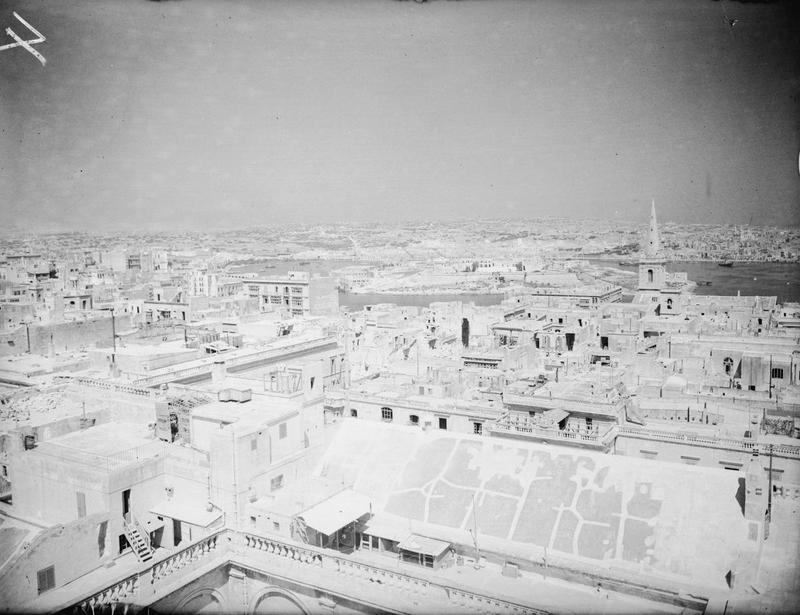
Marsamxett seen from Valletta in 1942

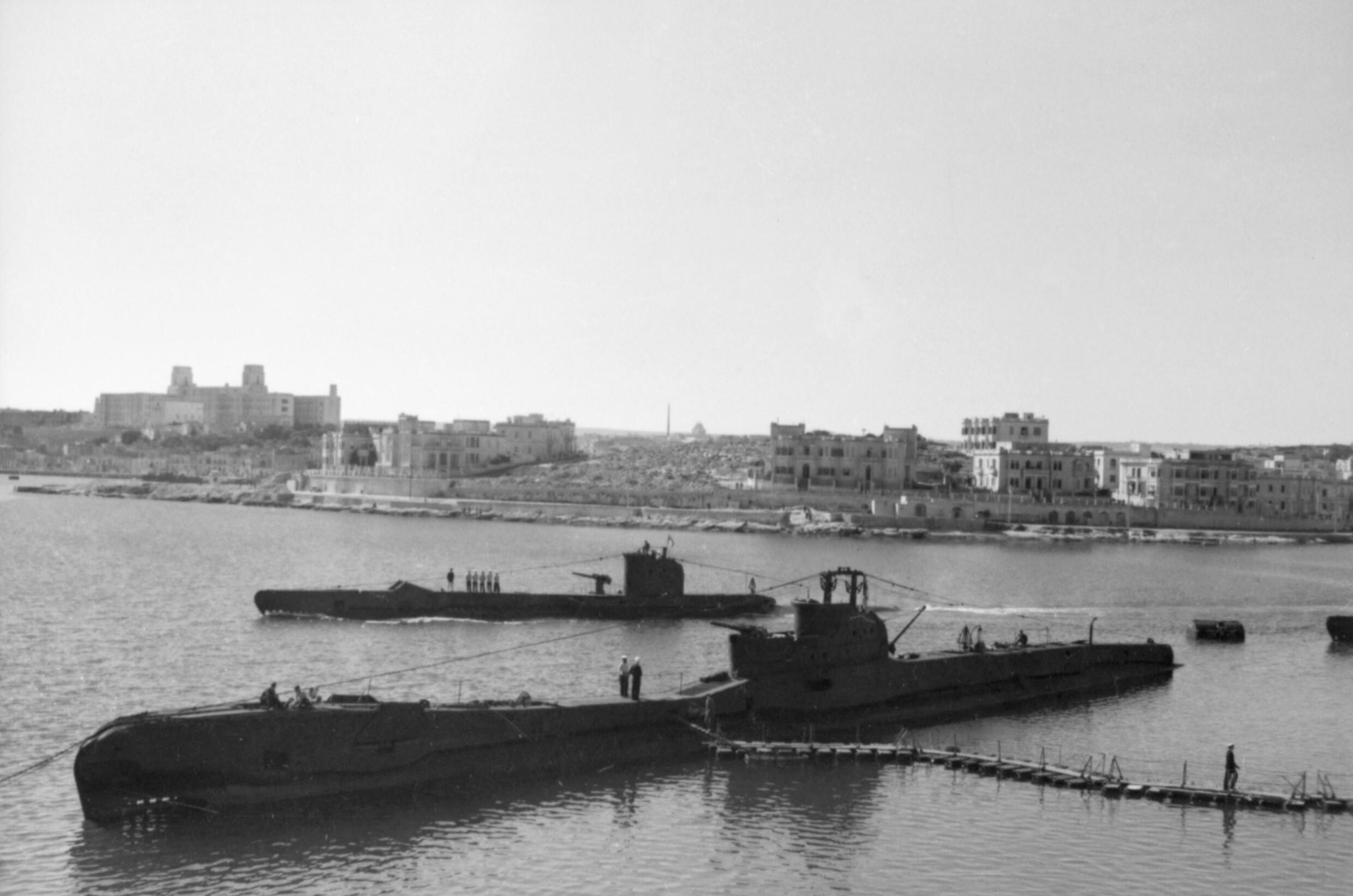
Royal Navy submarines at Manoel Island in World War II

In 1551, Ottomans landed at Marsamxett and marched upon the Grand Harbour, but did not attack as they found strong defences built by the Order of Saint John. This skirmish was followed by an unsuccessful attack against Mdina, and successful sacking of Gozo and conquest of Tripoli. After this attack, Fort Saint Elmo was built to guard both Marsamxett and the Grand Harbour.

A much larger Ottoman invasion came in 1565, in the Great Siege of Malta. During the siege, the Ottoman fleet was based at Marsamxett, and cannons were stationed at Tigné Point in order to bombard Fort Saint Elmo. During the attack, the Ottoman admiral Dragut was killed by stray gunfire. The siege was eventually lifted and the Order and the Maltese emerged victorious. A new city was constructed on the Sciberras Peninsula, and was named Valletta after the Grandmaster who commissioned it. The suburb of Floriana was later built outside the city, and it has now developed into a town in its own right.

In 1592, a wooden quarantine hospital was built on Manoel Island, then known as l'Isola del Vescovo. It was dismantled a year later, but a permanent Lazzaretto was built in its place in 1643, which was improved a number of times until its closure in 1929. Between 1723-33, Fort Manoel was built on Manoel Island, while Fort Tigné was built on Tigné Point in 1793. British barracks were also built on Tigné Point, but these have since been demolished.

During World War II, the British used Marsamxett, particularly Manoel Island, as a submarine base. The island was a stone frigate, referred to as HMS Talbot or HMS Phœnicia. Fort Manoel saw use once again, and it was bombarded by Luftwaffe bombers causing much destruction.

In 1977, the 1st (Maritime) Battery of the Armed Forces of Malta moved its base to Hay Wharf in Marsamxett.

Sliema, Gżira, and Ta' Xbiex on the northern end of the harbour have seen a lot of development in recent years. Marsamxett Harbour is now mainly used for smaller watercraft when compared to Grand Harbour. There are a number of yacht marinas including at Msida and Manoel Island, a yacht yard, as well as tourist cruise boats which operate from Sliema.

On 10 September 2006, during the Maltese round of the Aero GP series, a mid-air collision between two planes above the harbour caused the death of one of the pilots, Gabor Varga.

== Gallery ==
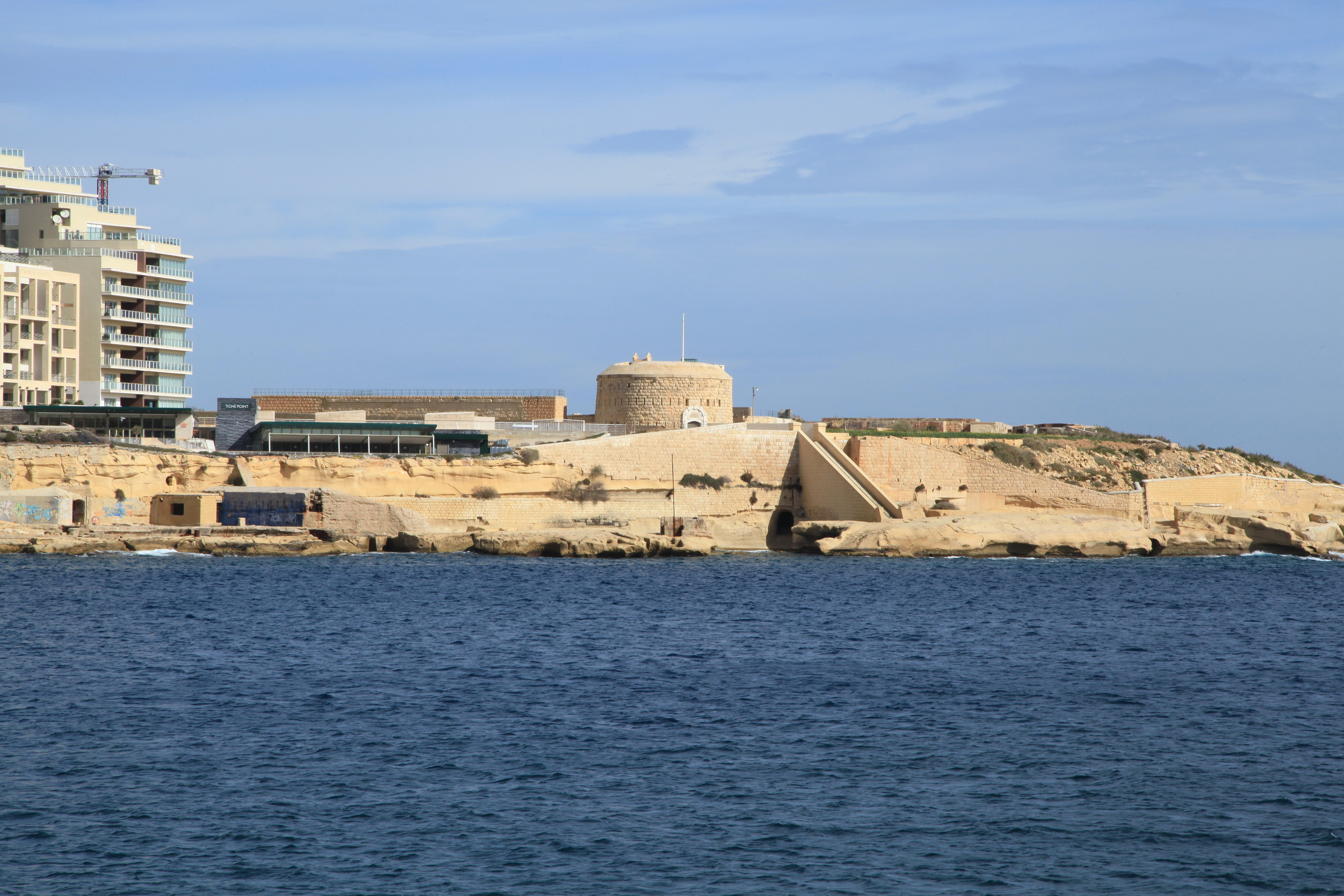
Fort Tigné
Sliema

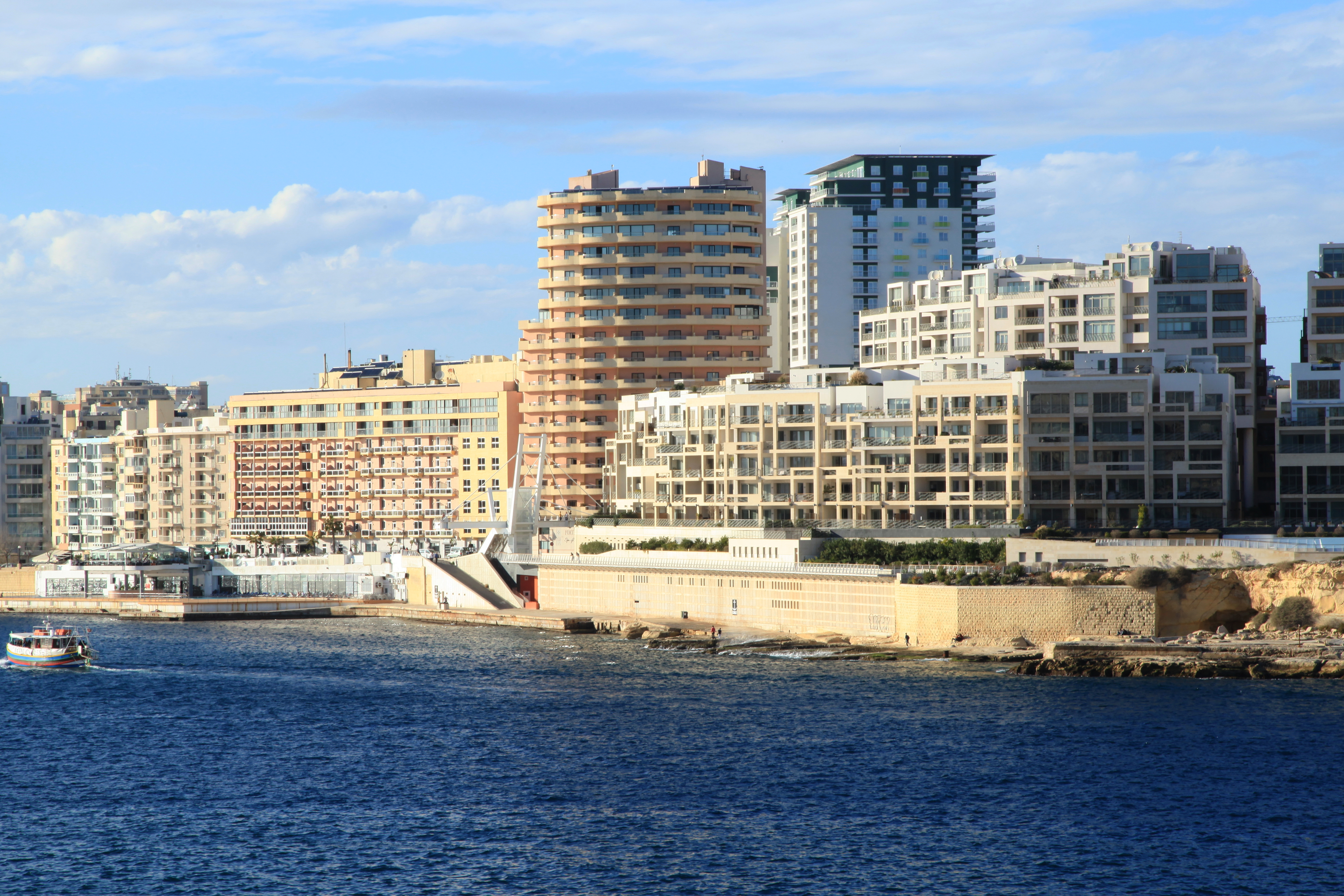
Tigné Point
Sliema

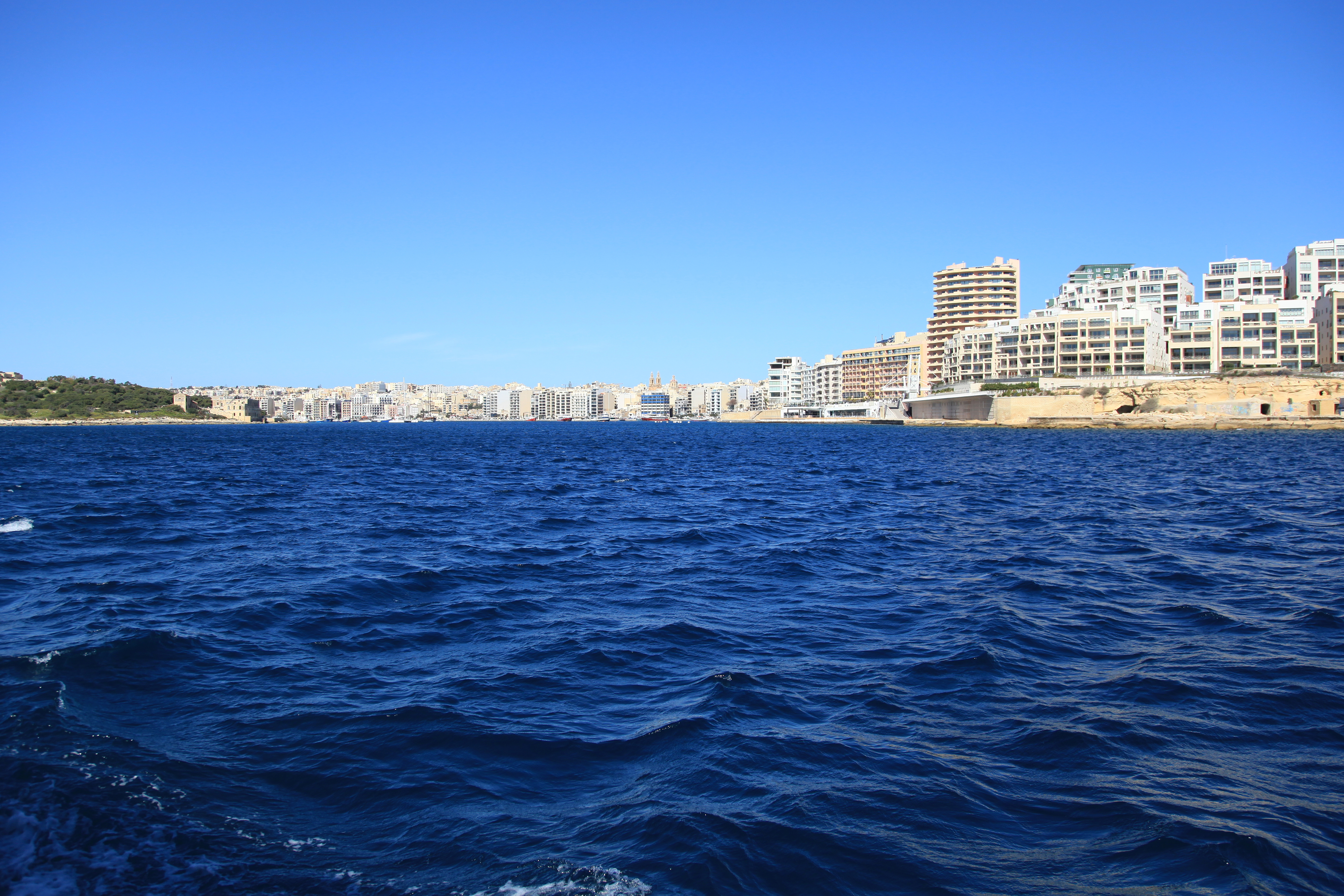
Sliema Creek
Sliema

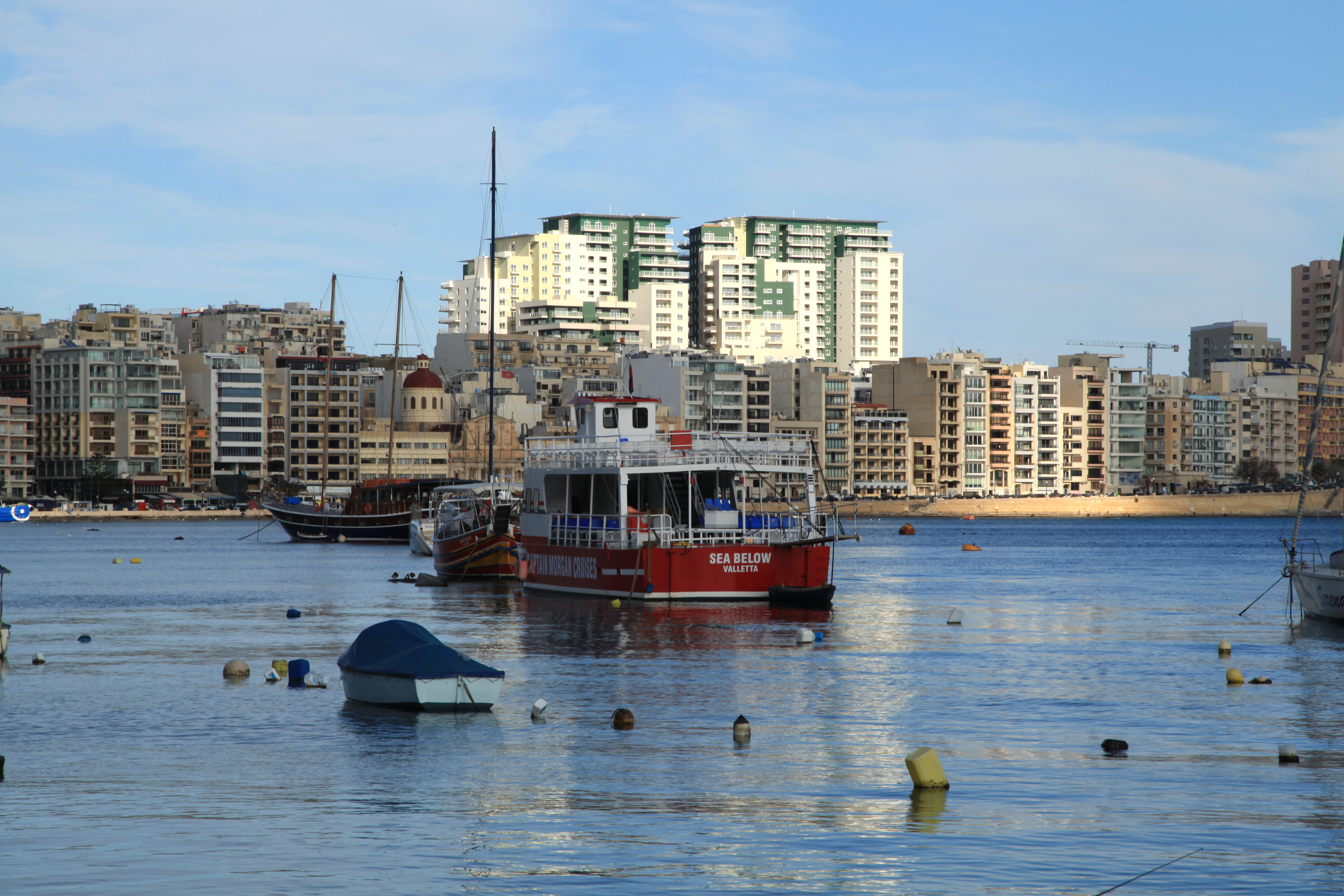
Sliema Harbour
Sliema

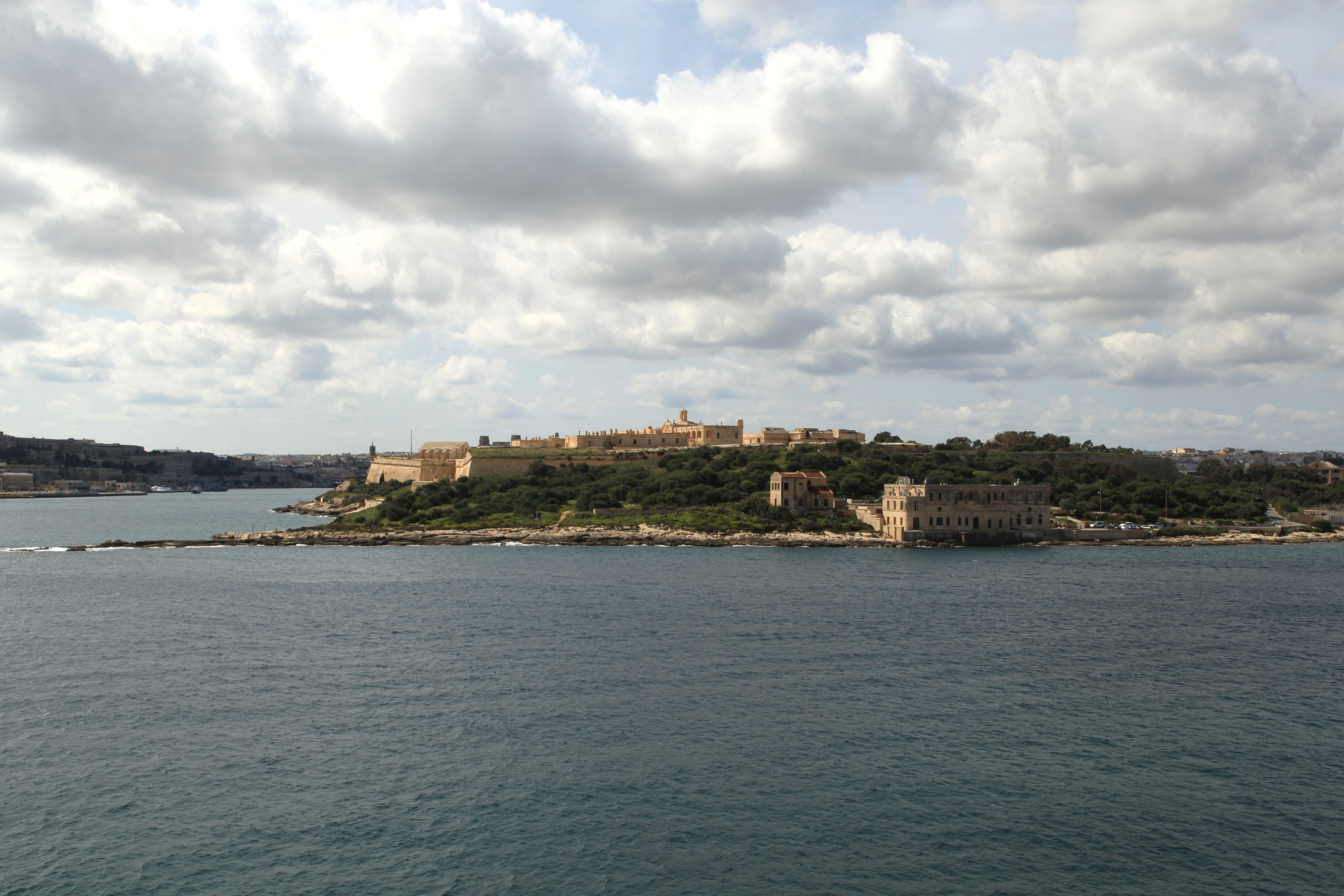
Manoel Island
Gżira

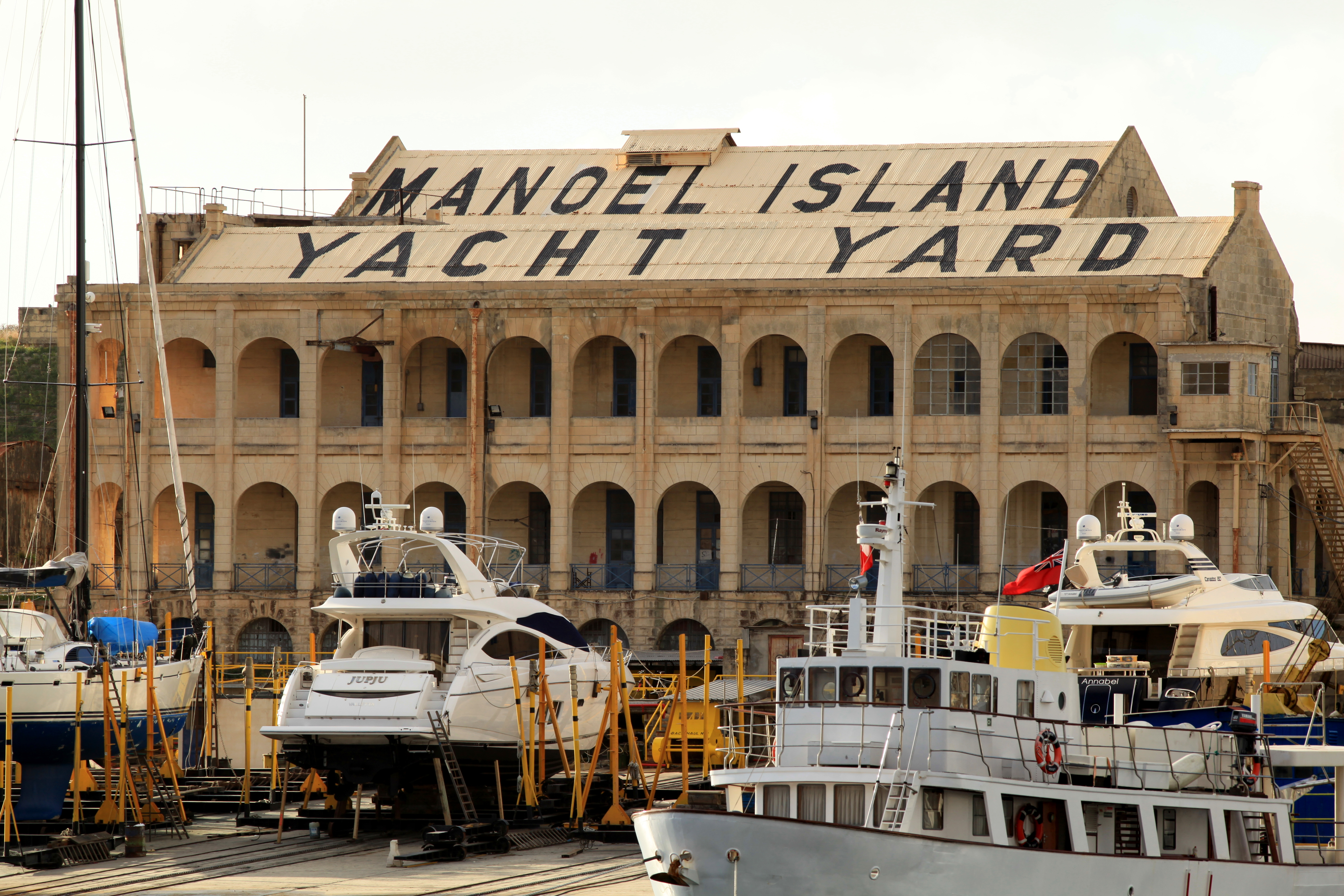
Manoel Island Yacht Yard
Gżira

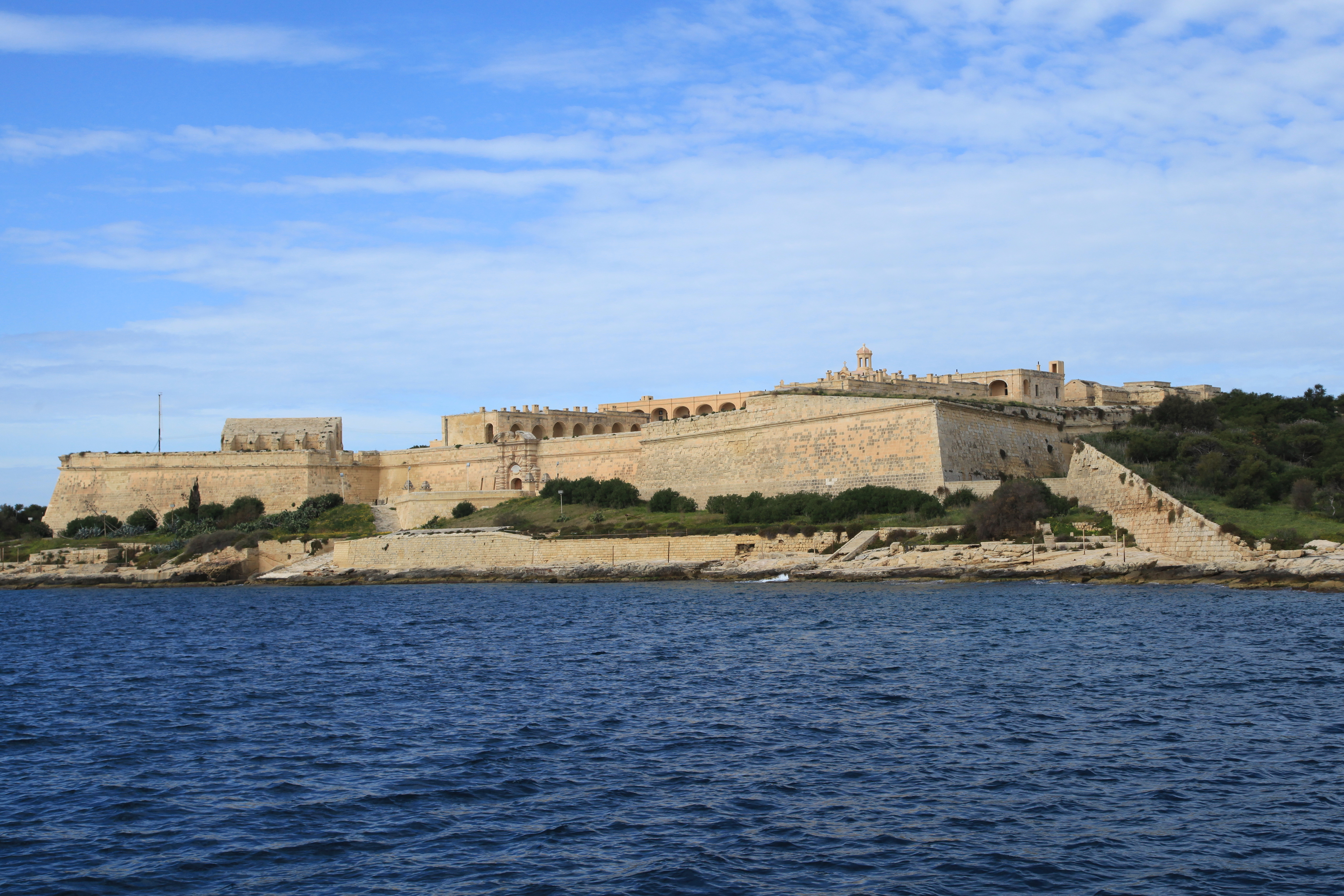
Fort Manoel
Gżira

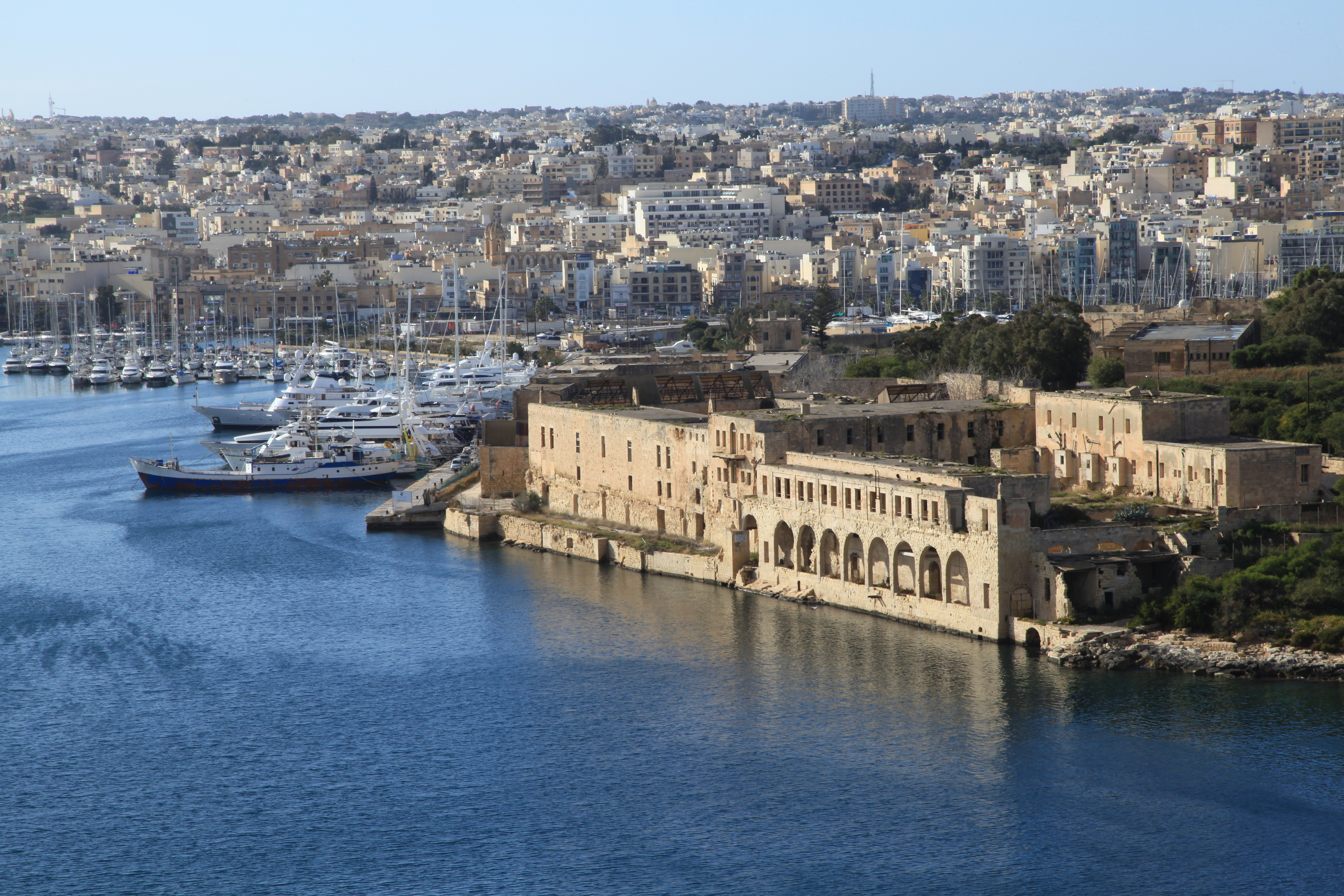
Lazzaretto
Gżira

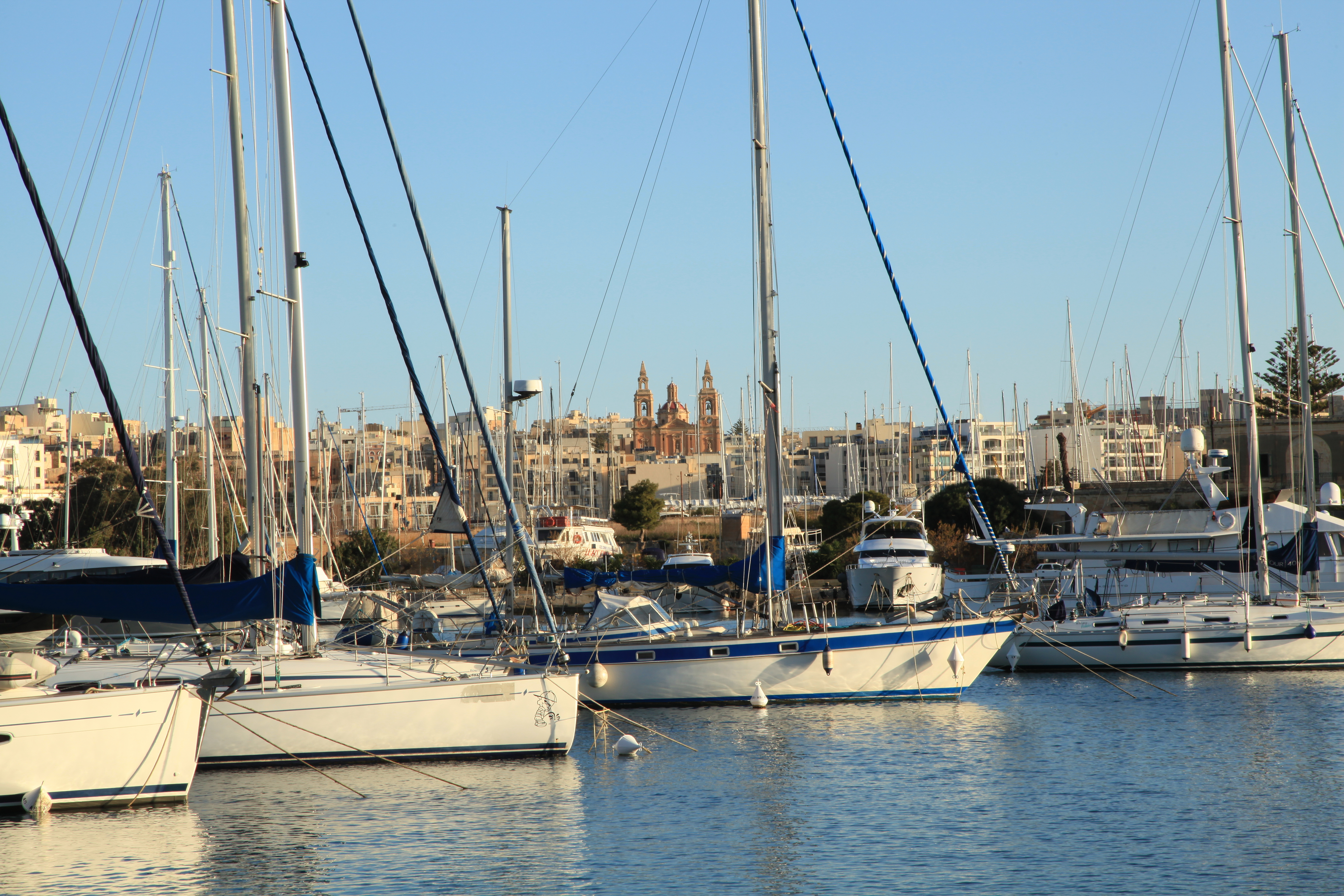
Manoel Island Yacht Marina
Gżira

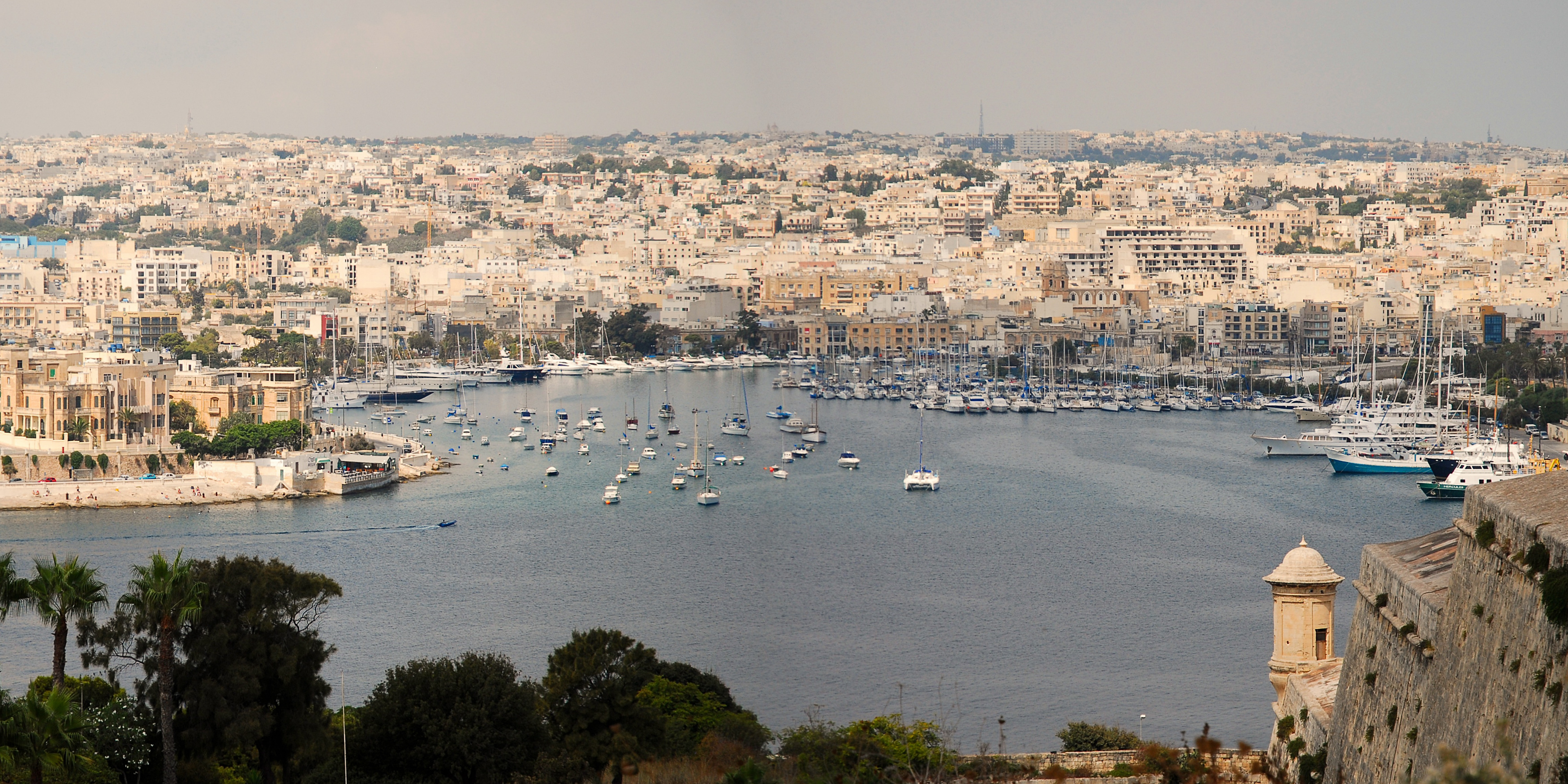
Lazzaretto Creek
Gżira and Ta' Xbiex

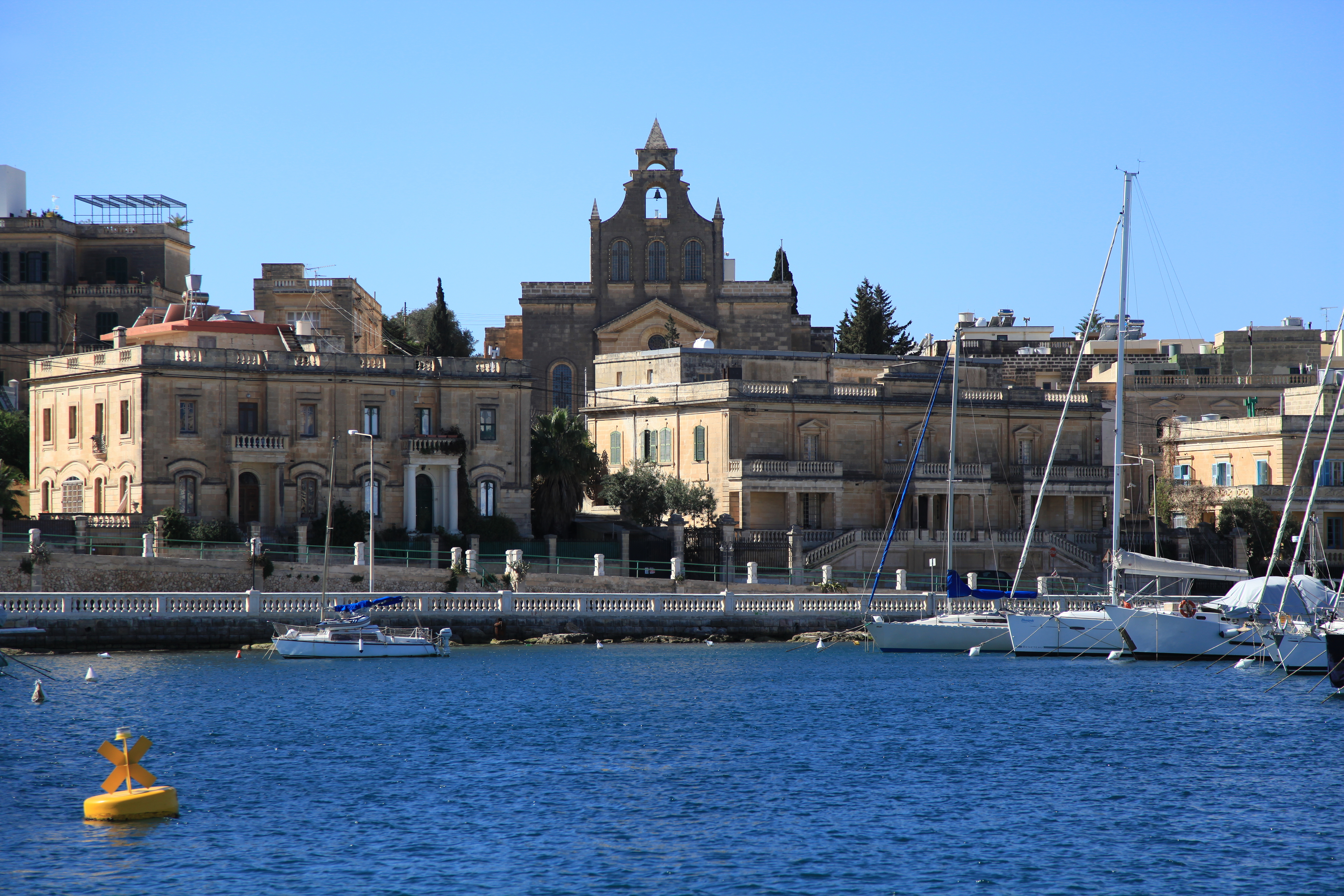
Ta' Xbiex

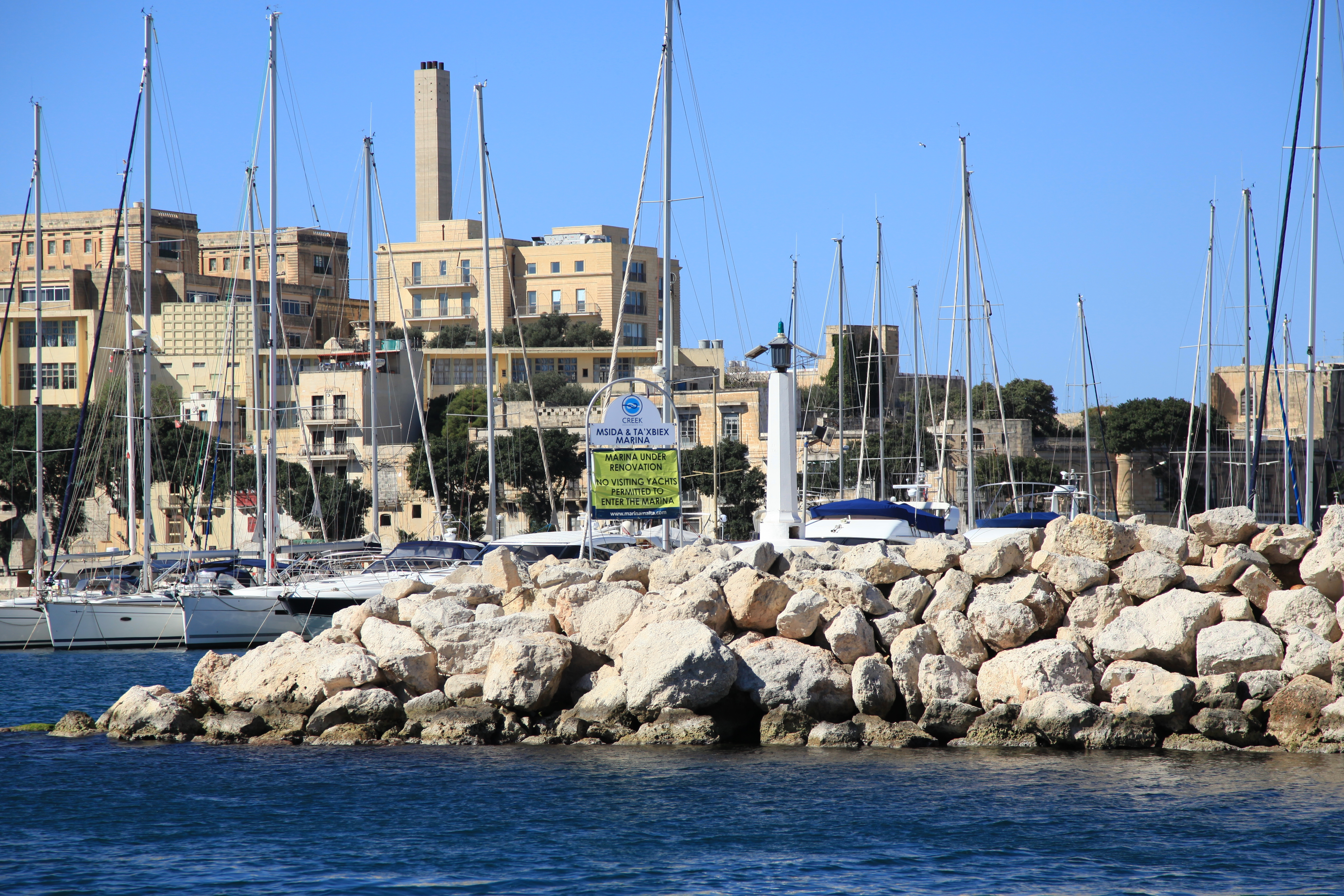
Ta' Xbiex Breakwater
Ta' Xbiex

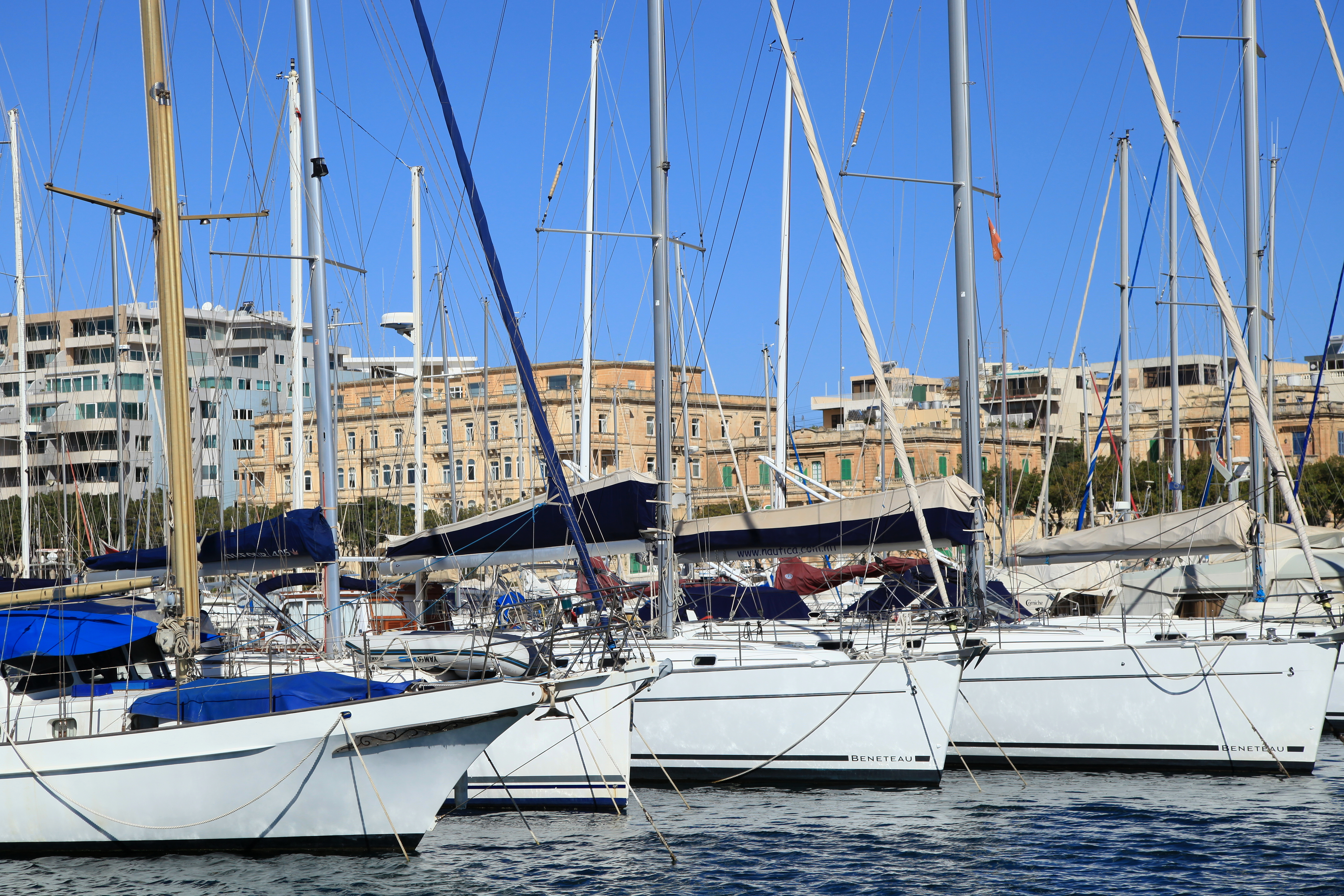
Msida Marina
Ta' Xbiex and Msida

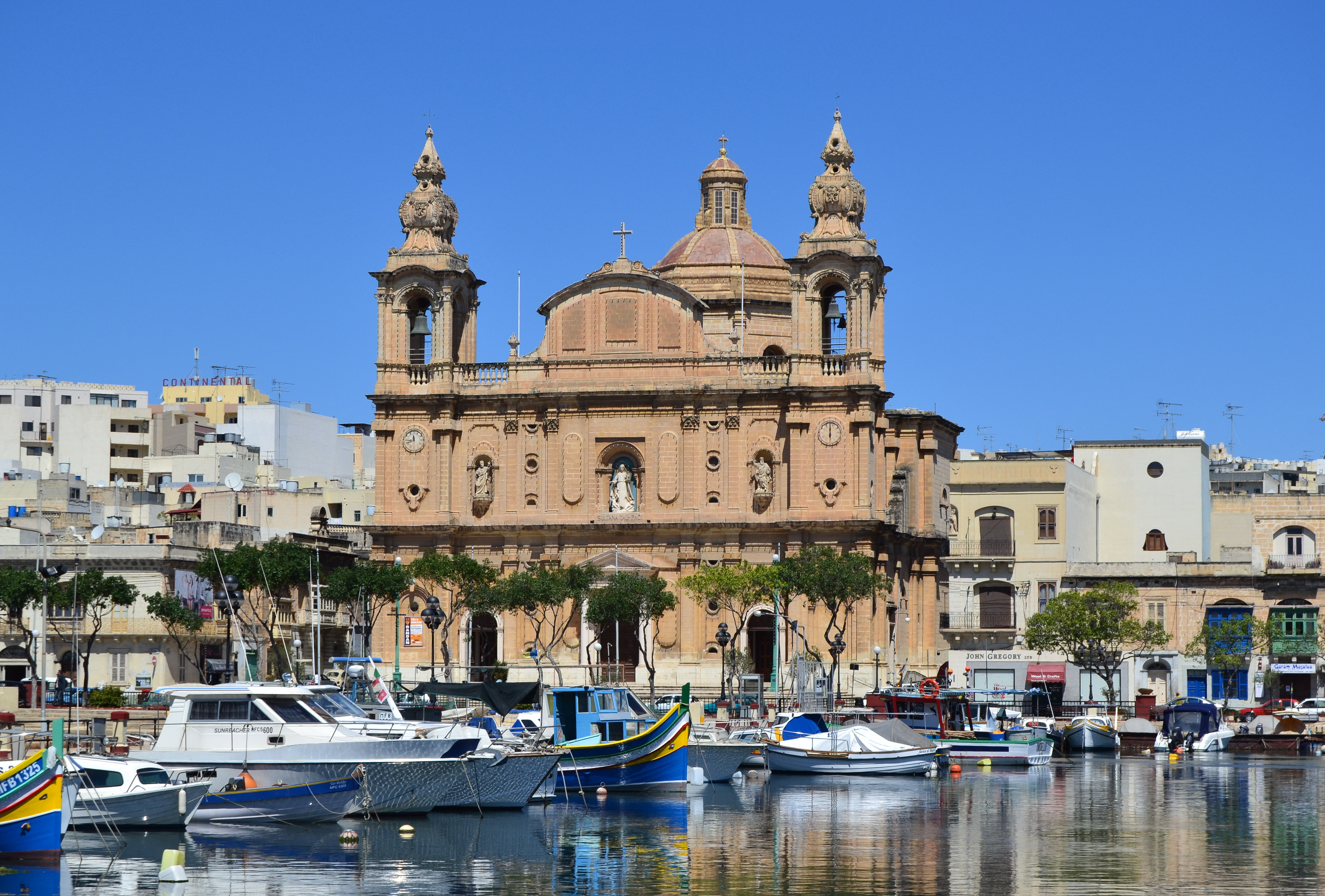
Msida

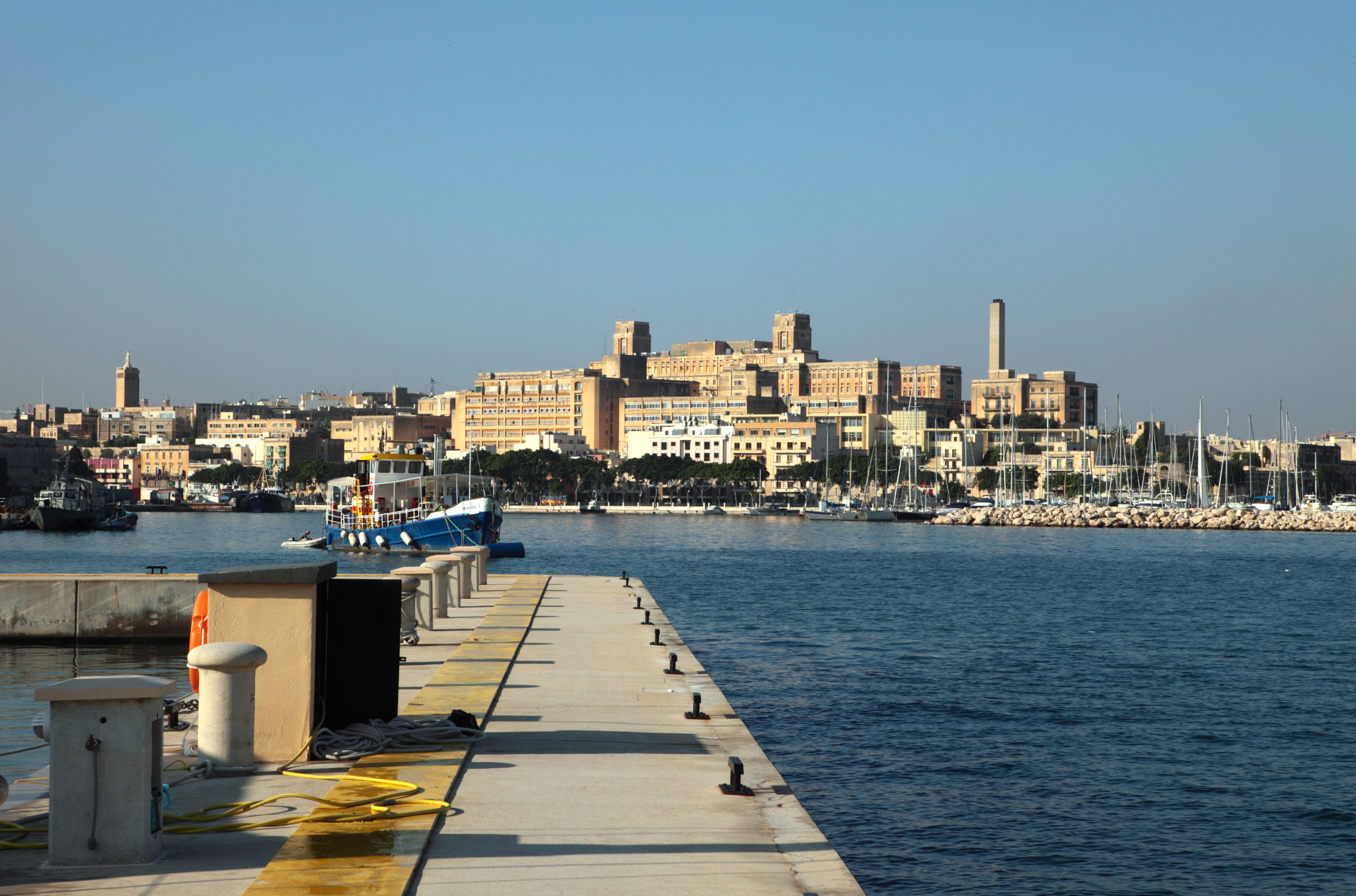
Saint Luke's Hospital
Pietà

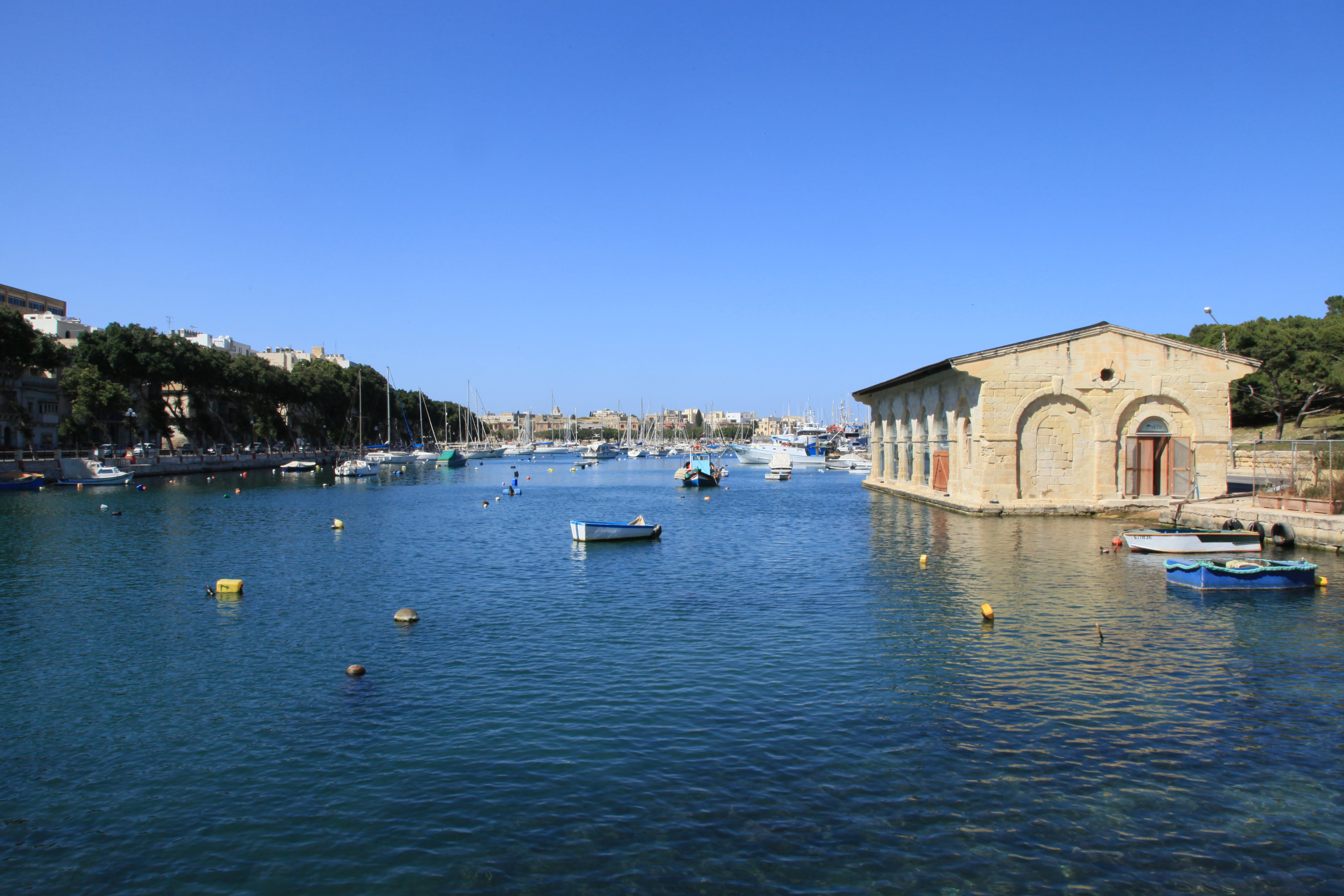
Pietà Creek
Pietà

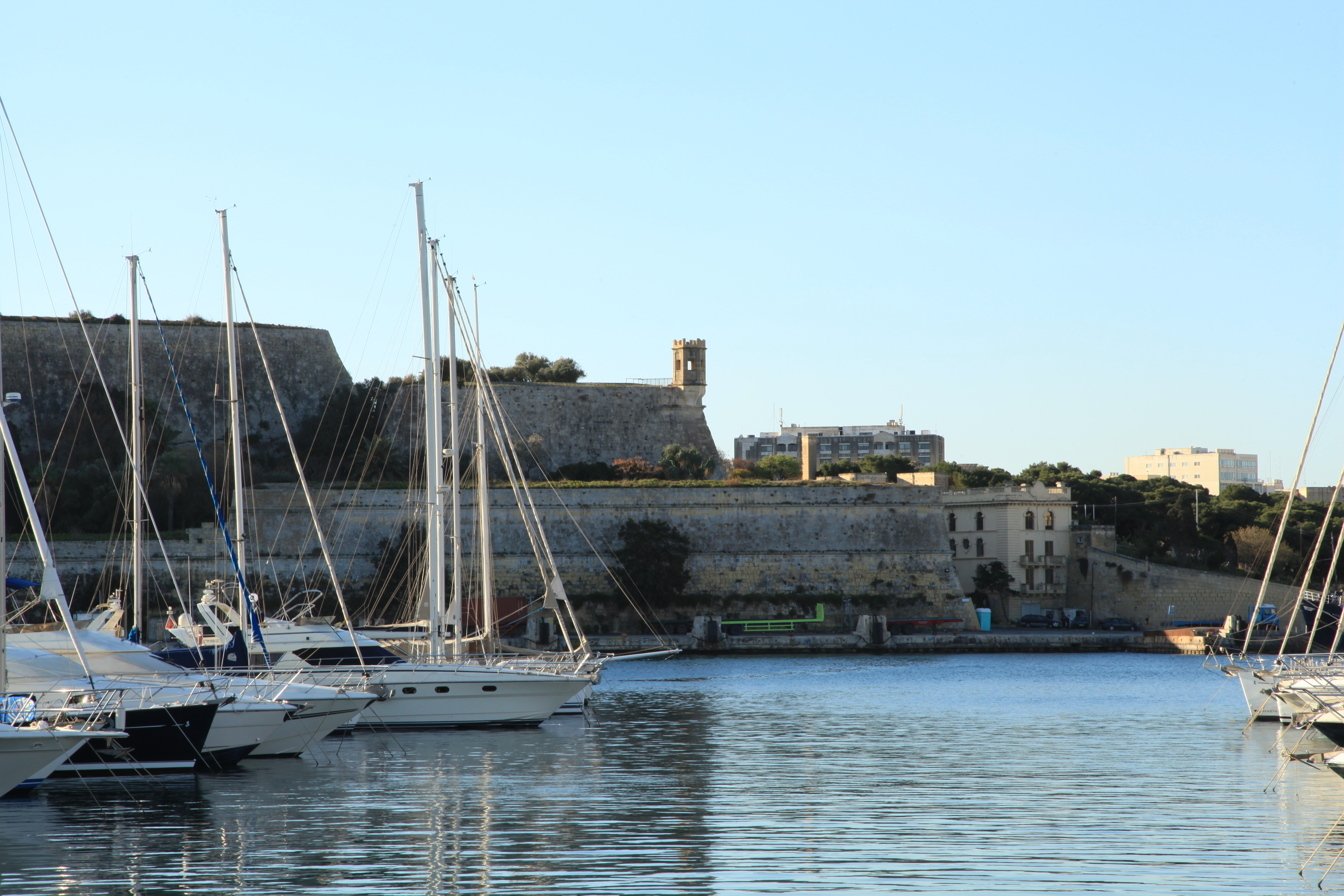
Floriana Lines
Floriana

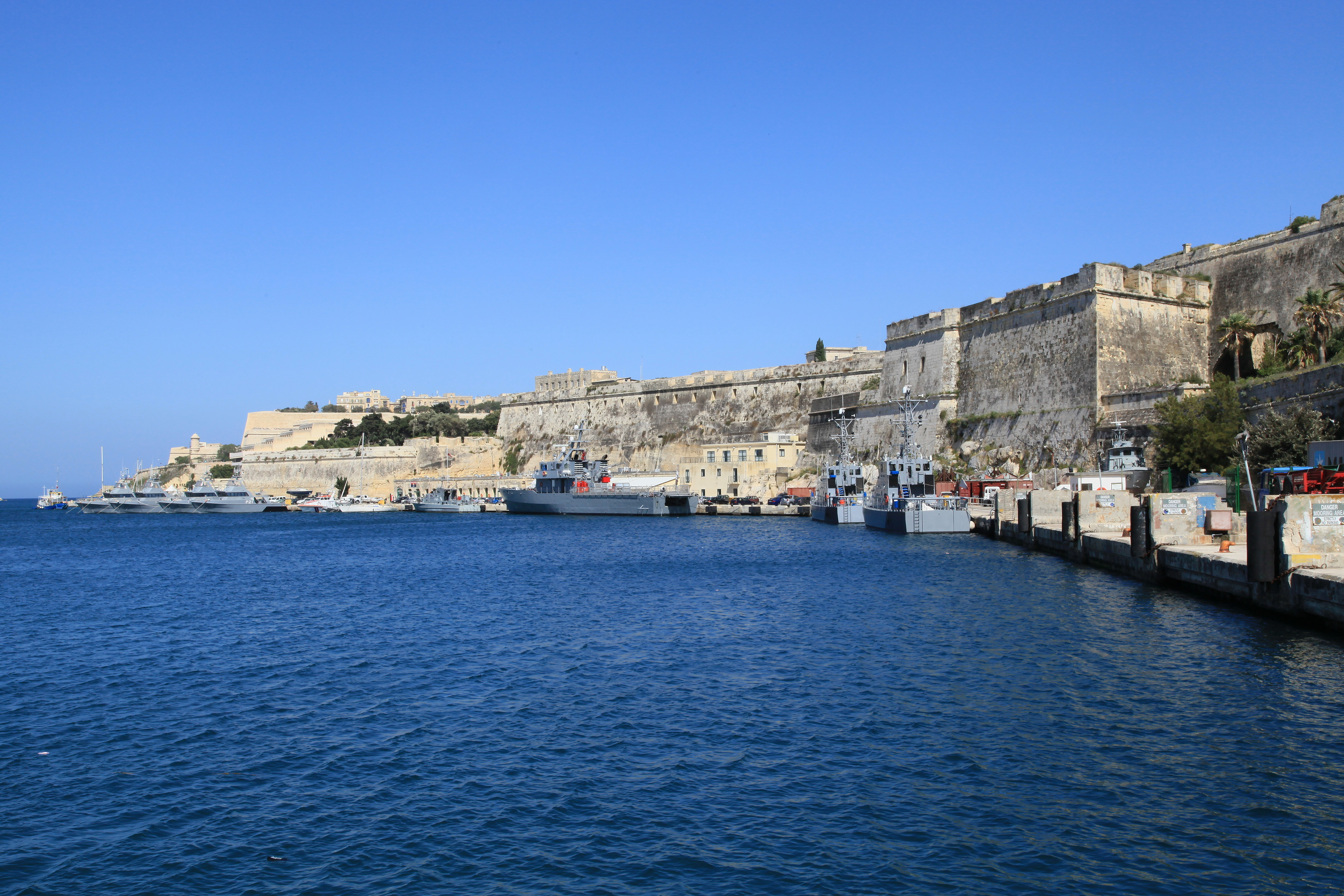
Hay Wharf
Floriana

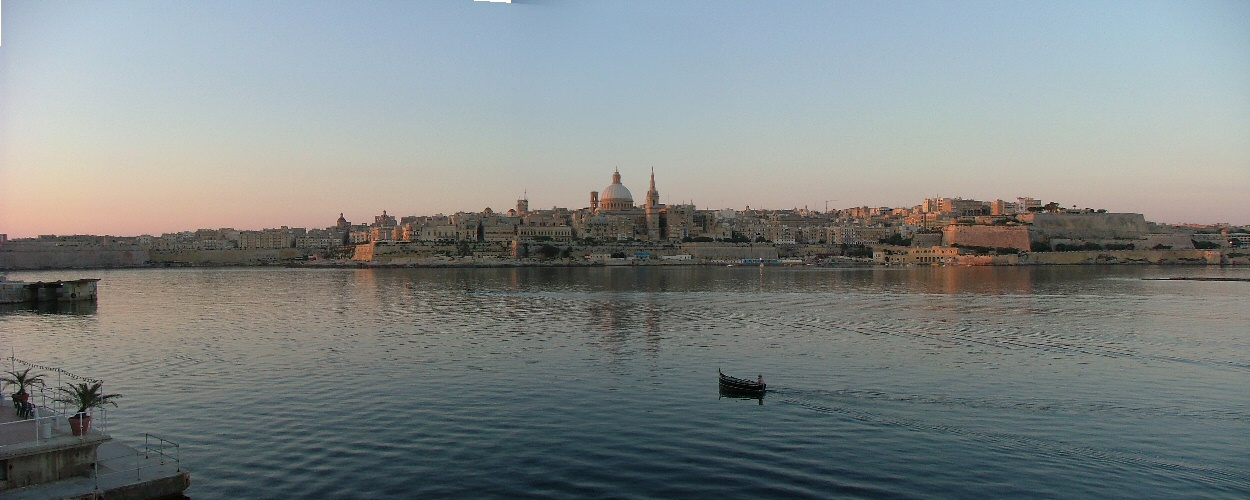
Valletta

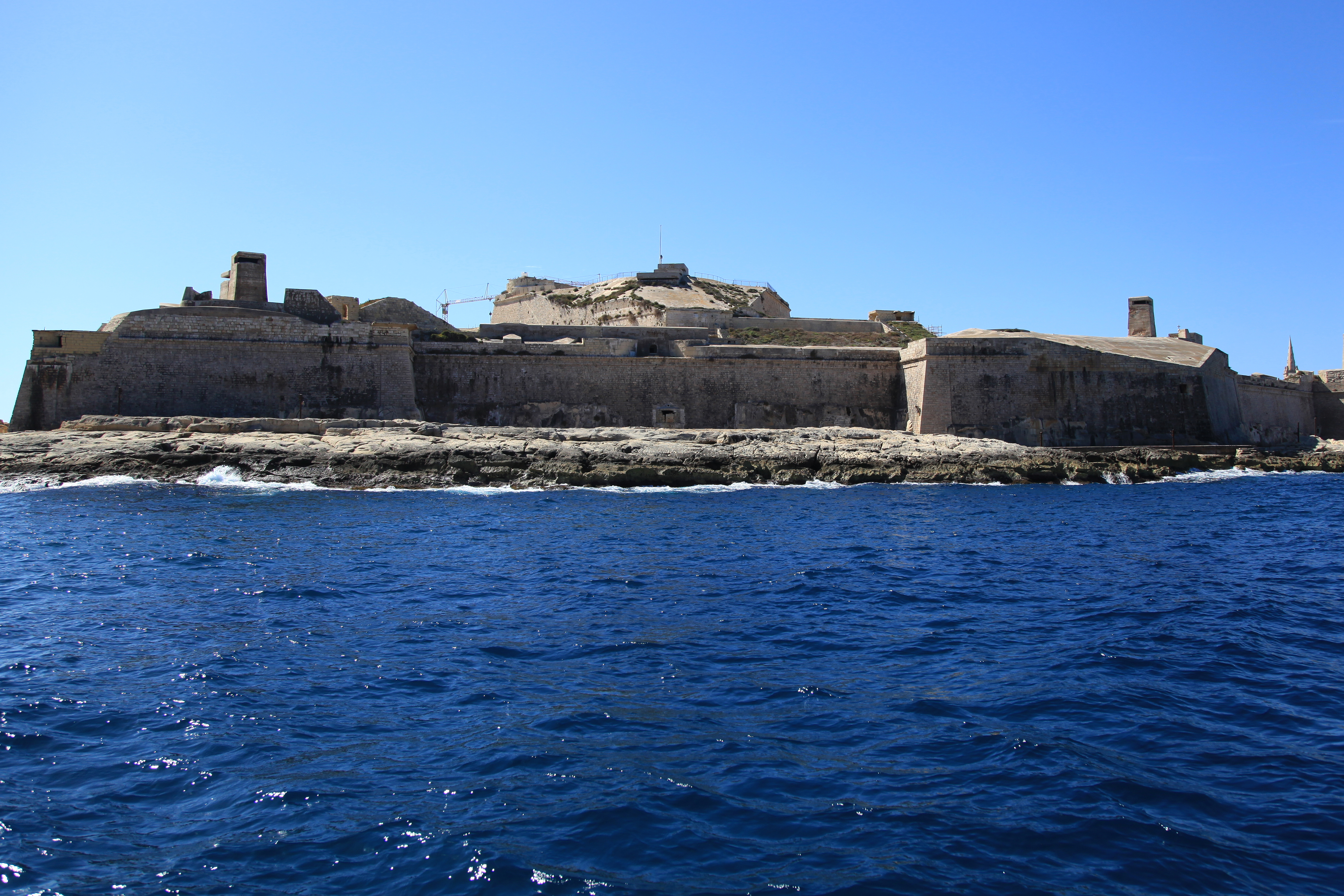
Fort Saint Elmo
Valletta

== See also ==
- Malta Freeport
