= Zoltak =

Zoltak, or Żółtak, is a surname of either Slavic or Polish origin, and may refer to:

- Daniel Żółtak (born 1984), Polish handball player
- Ozzy Zoltak (born 1983), Israeli musical artist
- Sidney Zoltak (born 1931), Polish-born Canadian author, and Holocaust educator

== See also ==
- Zoltán (name list)
