= Aero GP =

- Genre: Air Racing, Air Combat and Barnstorming air show
- Venue: Al Ain Aerobatic Show - January 30, 2010; Al Ain Aerobatic Show - January 30, 2009; Blackpool - June 29, 2008; Mamaia Beach, Constanta - June 8, 2008; Constanta - August 25, 2007; Malta - September 10, 2006; Slovenia - May 22, 2005
- Organiser: Flying Aces Ltd.
- Website: http://aero-gp.com

Aero GP is an international air racing series with up to eight specially designed high-performance sports planes all racing together at speeds of up to 400 kilometres per hour (250 mph) around a tight circuit just metres off the ground and from each other. The competing pilots are military and civilian pilots from around the world. Aero GP is the only international, televised event where aeroplanes race simultaneously. Aero GP officially started in 2005 in Slovenia. From there it has travelled to several countries in Europe and Middle East. Instead of the checked flag pattern, Aero GP judges its participants on the basis of points won in individual events; hence, there is no clear winner until the end of the event. The YouTube page for Aero GP has not been updated since 2013 and the original website is no longer online, so it is assumed that this racing league is now defunct.

== Competitive elements ==
Three primary disciplines in series decide the annual World Champion Flying Ace:

Air Racing: All racing at the same time, between six and eight aircraft reach speeds of 500 kilometres per hour (310 mph) at just 10 metres (33 ft) above the racecourse.

Air Combat: A real air-to-air "dogfight". Pilots take to the skies in an attempt to outmanoeuvre, hunt down and shoot each other out of the sky, in the style of military air combat.

Barnstorming: A third element which can consist of any of the following, depending on the venue: aerobatics, stunt flying or precision target dropping - pilots drop bombs from their aircraft at low altitude, aiming at various targets.

== History ==
The first Aero GP was held in 2005 although the concept dates to 2000. The inaugural event, held in Slovenia, was televised in over 100 countries. Since then Aero GP's have been held in Malta, Romania (twice), the United Kingdom, and Abu Dhabi in the UAE.

== Pilots ==
Aero GP pilots have backgrounds in flying a range of military and aerobatic aircraft. They come from various countries and backgrounds. Fighter pilots, aerobatics champions, and civil aviation pilots are all known to compete.

=== Regular Aero GP pilots ===
- (United Kingdom) Andy Bickmore
- (Hungary) Zoltan Veres
- (United States) "Smokey" Young
- (United Kingdom) Gerry Cooper
- (United Kingdom) Mark Jefferies

== 2008 series ==
The series consisted of two Aero GP's. June saw the Aero GP team return to Constanta in Romania, and this was followed by a second round in Blackpool, UK.

== 2009 series ==
The 2009 series saw Aero GP visit the Middle East for the first time. Aero GP headlined the Al Ain air show in the United Arab Emirates between January 29 and 31. Multiple other venues were discussed for 2009, and these were to be announced in the new year.

== Accidents ==
During the Malta show on 10 September 2006, two planes, an Extra EA-200 and a Yakovlev Yak-55, collided just outside Marsamxett Harbour off Valletta. The Swedish pilot of the Yak-55, aerobatics champion Gabor Varga, died instantly. However, the Irish Extra 200 pilot, Eddie Goggins, suffered only minor injuries and was soon released after the crash.
