= Thayer, Illinois =

Thayer
- Village
- Location of Thayer in Sangamon County, Illinois.
- Coordinates: 39°32′24″N 89°45′10″W
- Country: United States
- State: Illinois
- County: Sangamon

Area
  - Total: 0.61 sq mi (1.58 km^{2})
  - Land: 0.61 sq mi (1.58 km^{2})
  - Water: 0 sq mi (0.00 km^{2})
- Elevation: 640 ft (200 m)

Population (2020)
  - Total: 632
  - Density: 1,035.4/sq mi (399.76/km^{2})
- Time zone: UTC-6 (CST)
  - Summer (DST): UTC-5 (CDT)
- ZIP code: 62689
- Area code: 217
- FIPS code: 17-74860
- GNIS feature ID: 2399964
- Website: villageofthayer.org

Thayer is a village in Sangamon County, Illinois, United States. As of the 2020 census, Thayer had a population of 632. It is part of the Springfield, Illinois Metropolitan Statistical Area.

== Geography ==
According to the 2010 census, Thayer has a total area of 0.61 square miles (1.58 km^{2}), all land.

== Demographics ==
Historical population
Census	Pop.	Note	%±
1910	1,012		—
1920	1,254		23.9%
1930	813		−35.2%
1940	789		−3.0%
1950	695		−11.9%
1960	649		−6.6%
1970	616		−5.1%
1980	759		23.2%
1990	730		−3.8%
2000	750		2.7%
2010	693		−7.6%
2020	632		−8.8%
U.S. Decennial Census

As of the census of 2000, there were 750 people, 276 households, and 203 families residing in the village. The population density was 1,248.4 inhabitants per square mile (482.0/km^{2}). There were 288 housing units at an average density of 479.4 per square mile (185.1/km^{2}). The racial makeup of the village was 99.07% White, 0.13% African American, 0.53% from other races, and 0.27% from two or more races. Hispanic or Latino of any race were 0.80% of the population.

There were 276 households, out of which 38.4% had children under the age of 18 living with them, 63.4% were married couples living together, 8.3% had a female householder with no husband present, and 26.1% were non-families. 21.4% of all households were made up of individuals, and 10.9% had someone living alone who was 65 years of age or older. The average household size was 2.72 and the average family size was 3.18.

In the village, the population was spread out, with 29.7% under the age of 18, 8.4% from 18 to 24, 30.7% from 25 to 44, 18.4% from 45 to 64, and 12.8% who were 65 years of age or older. The median age was 33 years. For every 100 females, there were 104.9 males. For every 100 females age 18 and over, there were 97.4 males.

The median income for a household in the village was $42,031, and the median income for a family was $51,750. Males had a median income of $32,750 versus $24,904 for females. The per capita income for the village was $20,933. About 4.1% of families and 5.1% of the population were below the poverty line, including 1.0% of those under age 18 and 13.8% of those age 65 or over.

== Notable people ==
- Andrew F. Warga, member of the Wisconsin State Assembly elected in 1958
