= Zoltán Varga =

Zoltán Varga may refer to:

- Zoltán Varga (chess player) (born 1970), Hungarian chess grandmaster
- Zoltán Varga (footballer, born 1945) (1945–2010), Hungarian footballer
- Zoltán Varga (footballer, born 1977), Hungarian footballer
- Zoltán Varga (footballer, born 1983), Hungarian footballer
- Zoltán Varga (politician) (born 1952), Hungarian Minister of Local Government
- Zoltán Varga (rally driver) (born 1964), Hungarian rally driver
- Zoltán Szilágyi Varga (born 1951), Hungarian graphic artist and animation director
- Zoltán Varga (investor) (born 1967), Hungarian investor and publisher

== See also ==
- Zoltán
