= Silvia Vargová =

Slovak-Hungarian actress (born 1966)

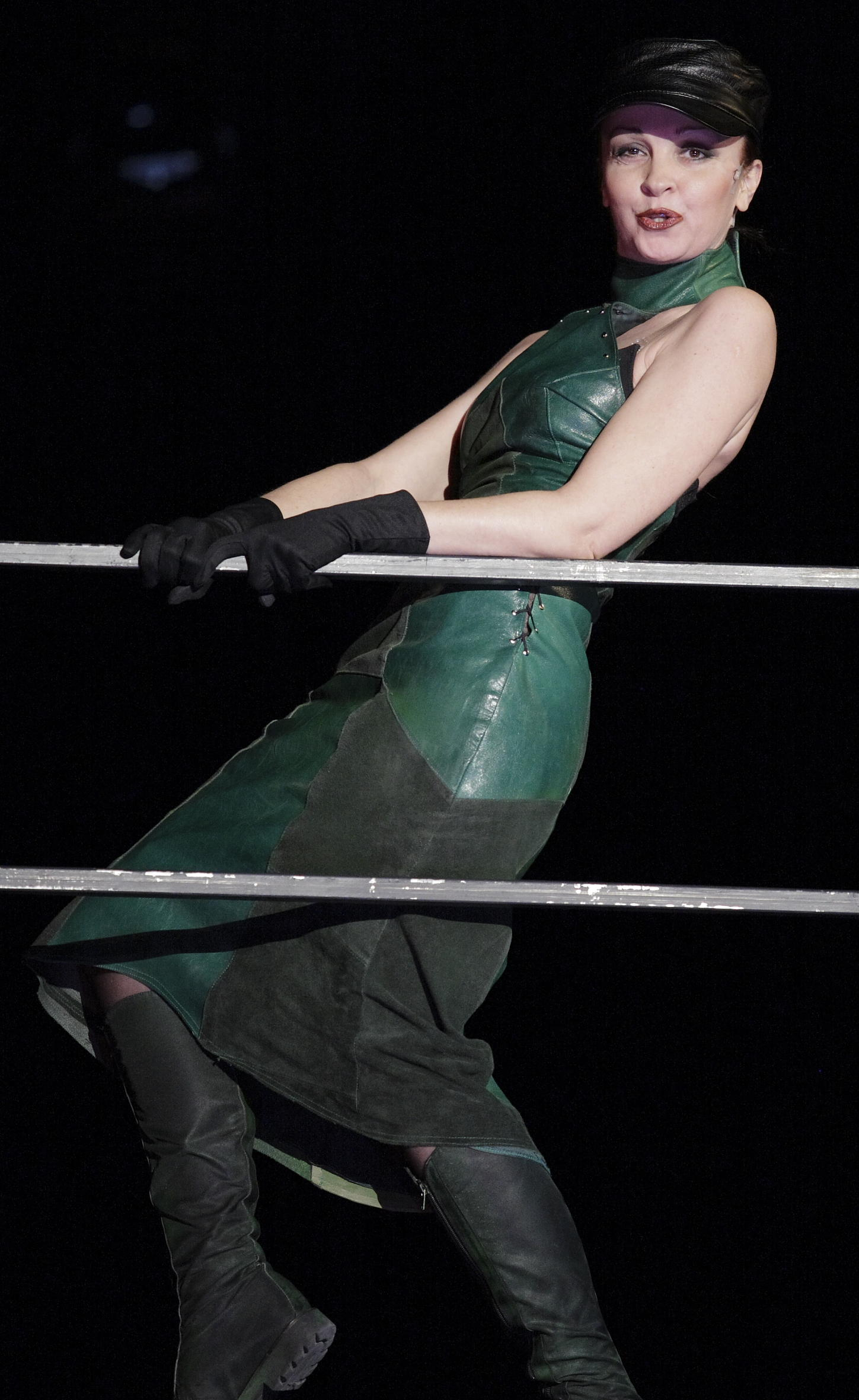
- Vargová in 2008
- Born: 12 May 1966 (age 60); Komárno, Czechoslovakia
- Occupations: Actress; singer
- Years active: 1985–present
- Spouse: Dezső Rancsó (actor)
- Children: 1

Silvia Vargová (Hungarian: Varga Szilvia) is a Slovak-Hungarian actress who mainly works in theatre. She has also done voice acting and appeared in films and on television.

== Biography ==
=== Studies and first acting roles ===
Silvia Vargová graduated from the Komárno technical high school in 1984. She was a member of an arts group at the Thália theatre in Košice between 1985 and 1987. The theatre at that point served as an extended stage of the Hungarian Regional Theatre, which was founded in October 1952 and had its headquarters in Komárno.

The actress's first minor stage role was that of the young Marcius from Shakespeare's Coriolanus. Her next, and first major role, was in the fairy tale The Golden Key, or the Adventures of Buratino, written by Russian author Aleksey Nikolayevich Tolstoy, where she starred as Buratino—a young wooden boy modelled on Pinocchio.

Between 1987 and 1991, she studied at the Academy of Performing Arts in Bratislava, while also completing one semester at the Academy of Drama and Film in Budapest.

=== Post-graduation career ===
After graduating from the Academy of Performing Arts, Vargová briefly worked at the Jókai Theatre in Komárno, and from 1991 to 1994 was a member of an arts group at Petőfi Theatre in Veszprém. In 1995, she moved with her husband, actor Dezső Rancsó, to the larger Hungarian city of Kecskemét, where, in addition to theatre work, she also did voice acting for foreign-language productions.

In the early 2000s, she moved with her family to the city of Sopron, where she took part in such productions as Casting and Summer of Old Times/Régi nyár.

Between 2007 and 2015, Vargová worked as a freelance actor, starring in hits such as Chicago, The Marriage of Figaro, The Gipsy Princess, Countess Maritza, and Hungarian Zombie. Since 2016, she has been performing at the Thália Theatre of Košice once more, appearing in such productions as Molière's The Misanthrope.

Vargová has also acted in a few movies and television shows, including Samba, Chameleon, and Among Friends.
