= Zoltar =

Zoltar may refer to

- Zoltar (fortune-telling robot), a fortune-telling arcade amusement, featured in the 1988 film Big
- Zoltar (Battle of the Planets), a character from the anime series Battle of the Planets
