= Zoltán Varga (rally driver) =

Hungarian rally driver

Zoltán "Cigány" Varga (Note: Cigány is Hungarian for "Gypsy") (born March 11, 1964, in Budapest) is a Hungarian rally driver, known for his storytelling, jokes and good humour.

== Early life ==
Varga's father was an engineer in the Weapon and Gas Appliance Factory, but died in a football match at only 63 years old. As Varga has stated in several interviews, he was not a good child, but he became a pioneer and got the red tie. He finished a pioneer course and got a very good score. He has been interested in rally racing since the age of 14.

Varga was often truant in his youth due to his enthusiasm in racing. He would buy matchboxes, such as a Wartburg or a Polski Fiat and revamp some of them into rally racing cars. He became disinterested in schooling as rally racing season approached, and was known to cause trouble for his teachers during this time. It was a milestone in his life when he decided to transform his Lada into a racing car, marking the transition from aspiring racer to an actual racer.

== Rally career ==
Varga's rally career began in 1982, when he took part in the Mátra Cup. On his first competition, he raced with a driving licence which had been soaked in cacao. On his fourth race, Varga had a great accident and because of it he got into a car magazine. In the beginning of his early career, he had 23 total cars with a few crushes. László Pénzes became his navigator between 1984–1994. At the same time he wrote down a contract so he could race in Rally3, and one year later he became a Rally2 driver at the Hungarocamion. As a Rally2 driver, Zoltán Varga and his navigator lined up in the Autumn 1984.

In 2002, Varga bought a new car: a BMW E30 M3 racing car. It was a big step for him, because he did not have enough money to buy a WRC. He spent a lot of money redesigning his BMW, revamping it into a powerful vehicle with a 2300 cc, 300-Horsepower engine, a 6-gear shift and a large differential. In 2000, he hired a new navigator by the name of Ferenc Sand.

Varga has won several awards. In 2003, 2004 and 2005, he won several prizes featured on Www.rally.hu. Today, he races in Italy.
