= Andrew F. Warga =

American politician

Andrew F. Warga (1919–1998) was an American politician who was a member of the Wisconsin State Assembly.

== Biography ==
Warga was born on February 12, 1919, in Thayer, Illinois. During World War II, he served in the United States Army. He was a member of the American Legion and the Veterans of Foreign Wars.

He died in Florida on February 26, 1998.

== Political career ==
Warga was elected to the Assembly in 1958. He was a Democrat.
