= Zoltán Takács (toxinologist) =

Zoltán Takács is a Hungarian-born toxinologist and tropical adventurer specializing in venomous snakes and snake venoms. He is a National Geographic Society Emerging Explorer.

Takacs holds a Ph.D. in pharmacology from Columbia University. As a faculty at the University of Chicago he co-invented the designer toxin technology, which creates a large number of animal toxin variants and screens for those that bind to a potential drug target. His other main research area is why cobras and sea snakes are resistant to their own venom.

At Columbia University, Takacs served as an Earth Institute Fellow, and is a recipient of the National Geographic Society's Research and Exploration grant. He has been featured on the National Geographic Channel and on the PBS/NOVA series in several snake documentaries. Takacs has traveled to 133 countries, is an aircraft pilot, scuba diver, and wildlife photographer.
