= Gabor Varga (aviator) =

Swedish aviator (1961–2006)

Gabor Varga (15 March 1961 – 10 September 2006) was a Swedish aviator who was in the Guinness Book of Records for having performed 256 aerobatic loops in an hour.

On 10 September 2006, Varga was performing during the Aero GP air show over Marsamxett Harbour off Valletta, Malta, in his Yakovlev Yak-55 when he was killed instantly in a mid-air collision with the Extra EA-200 of Irish pilot Eddie Goggins. Goggins survived with minor injuries.
